= List of compositions by Victor Herbert =

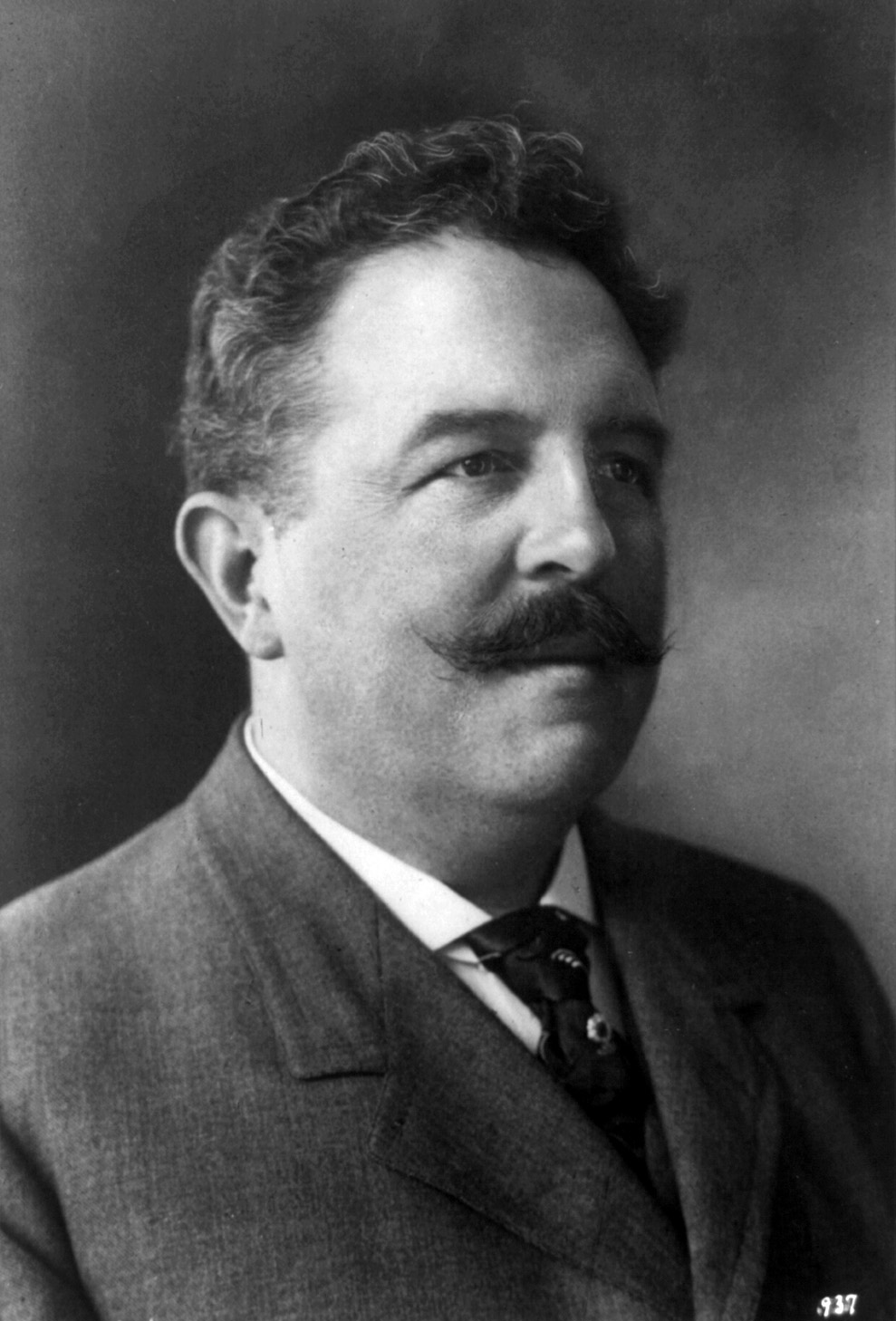
Victor Herbert

Victor Herbert (1859–1924) was an American musician, conductor and prolific composer, prominent in the Tin Pan Alley community. He is best known for his many operettas that premiered on Broadway from the 1890s to World War I.

Herbert produced two operas, a cantata, 43 operettas, incidental music to 10 plays, 31 compositions for orchestra, nine band compositions, nine cello compositions, five violin compositions with piano or orchestra, 22 piano compositions and numerous songs, choral compositions and orchestrations of works by other composers, among other music.

== Stage works ==
Title	Genre	Subdivisions	Libretto	Première date	Place and theatre
Prince Ananias	operetta	2 acts	Francis Neilson	20 November 1894	The Broadway Theatre
The Wizard of the Nile	operetta	3 acts	Harry B. Smith	4 November 1895	Casino Theatre
The Gold Bug	musical farce	3 acts	Glen MacDonough, adapted from a story by G. A. Pierce	21 September 1896	Casino Theatre
The Serenade	operetta	3 acts	Harry B. Smith	16 March 1897	Knickerbocker Theatre
The Idol's Eye	operetta	3 acts	Harry B. Smith	25 October 1897	The Broadway Theatre
The Fortune Teller	operetta	3 acts	Harry B. Smith	26 September 1898	Wallack's Theatre
The Ameer	operetta	3 acts	Frederick M. Rankin and Kirke LaShelle	4 December 1899	Wallack's Theatre
Cyrano de Bergerac	operetta	3 acts	Book by Stuart Reed based on the play by Edmond Rostand	18 September 1899	Knickerbocker Theatre
The Singing Girl	operetta	3 acts	Book by Stanislaus Stange, Lyrics by Harry B. Smith	23 October 1899	Casino Theatre
The Viceroy	operetta	2 acts	Harry B. Smith	9 April 1900	Knickerbocker Theatre
Babes in Toyland	operetta	Prologue, 3 acts, 11 scenes	Book and lyrics by Glen MacDonough	13 October 1903	Majestic Theatre
Babette	operetta	3 acts	Harry B. Smith	16 November 1903	The Broadway Theatre
It Happened In Nordland	Musical comedy	Prologue and 2 acts	Book and Lyrics by Glen MacDonough	5 December 1904	Wallack's Theatre
Wonderland	Fantastic musical play	3 acts and 8 scenes	Book and lyrics by Glen MacDonough	24 October 1905	Majestic Theatre
Miss Dolly Dollars	Musical comedy	2 acts	Book and lyrics by Harry B. Smith	4 September 1905	Knickerbocker Theatre
Mlle. Modiste	operetta	2 acts	Libretto by Henry Blossom	25 December 1905	Knickerbocker Theatre
The Red Mill	operetta	2 acts	Book and lyrics by Henry Blossom	24 September 1906	Knickerbocker Theatre
The Magic Knight	operetta and burlesque	1 act	Libretto and lyrics by Edgar Smith	25 December 1906	Weber's Music Hall
Dream City	operetta	1 act	Libretto and lyrics by Edgar Smith	25 December 1906	Weber's Music Hall
The Tattooed Man	operetta	2 acts	Book by Harry B. Smith and A.N.C. Fowler, Lyrics by Harry B. Smith	18 February 1907	Criterion Theatre
The Songbirds	operetta	1 act	Book and lyrics by George V. Hobart	1 April 1907	The New York Theatre
Algeria	Musical play	2 acts	Book and lyrics by Glen MacDonough	31 August 1908	The Broadway Theatre
Little Nemo	Musical comedy	3 acts and 11 scenes	Book and lyrics by Harry B. Smith, based on the comic strip Little Nemo in Slumberland by Winsor McCay	20 October 1908	New Amsterdam Theatre
The Prima Donna	Comic opera	2 acts	Libretto and lyrics by Henry Blossom	30 November 1908	Knickerbocker Theatre
The Rose of Algeria	Musical play	2 acts and 4 scenes	Book and lyrics by Glen MacDonough	20 September 1909	Herald Square Theatre
Old Dutch	Musical Farce	2 acts and 3 scenes	Book by Edgar Smith, Lyrics by George V. Hobart	22 November 1909	Herald Square Theatre
Naughty Marietta	operetta	2 acts and 3 scenes	Book and lyrics by Rida Johnson Young	7 November 1910	The New York Theatre
When Sweet Sixteen	Songplay	2 acts	Book and lyrics by George V. Hobart	14 September 1911	Daly's Theatre
Natoma	opera	3 acts	Libretto by Joseph D. Redding	25 February 1911	Philadelphia
The Duchess	operetta	3 acts	Book and lyrics by Joseph W. Herbert and Harry B. Smith	16 October 1911	Lyric Theatre
The Enchantress	operetta	2 acts	Book and lyrics by Fred de Grésac and Harry B. Smith	19 October 1911	The New York Theatre
The Lady of the Slipper	Musical fantasy	3 acts and 5 scenes	Book and lyrics by Rida Johnson Young	28 October 1912	Globe Theatre, New York
Sweethearts	Musical play	2 acts	Book by Harry B. Smith, Lyrics by Robert B. Smith	8 September 1913	New Amsterdam Theatre
The Madcap Duchess	operetta	2 acts	Book and lyrics by David Stevens and Justin Huntly McCarthy; based on the novel Seraphica by Justin Huntly McCarthy	11 November 1913	Globe Theatre, New York
Madeleine	opera	1 act	Libretto by Grant Stewart, after the French play Je dîne chez ma mère (I'm dining at my mother's house) by Adrien Decourcelle and Lambert-Thiboust	24 January 1914	Metropolitan Opera
The Only Girl	Musical comedy	3 acts	Book and lyrics by Henry Blossom; based on the play Our Wives by Frank Mandel	2 November 1914	39th Street Theatre
The Debutante	Musical comedy	2 acts	Book by Harry B. Smith and Robert B. Smith. Lyrics by Robert B. Smith	7 December 1914	Kinckerbocker Theatre
The Princess Pat	operetta	3 acts	Book and lyrics by Henry Blossom	29 September 1915	Cort Theatre
Eileen	operetta	3 acts	Book and lyrics by Henry Blossom	19 October 1917	Sam S. Shubert Theatre
Miss 1917	revue	2 acts	Book and lyrics by Guy Bolton and P.G. Wodehouse; other music by Jerome Kern	5 November 1917	Century Theatre
Her Regiment	operetta	3 acts	Book and lyrics by William Le Baron	12 November 1917	Broadhurst Theatre
The Velvet Lady	Musical comedy	3 acts	Book by Fred Jackson based on his farce A Full House; adaptation and lyrics by Henry Blossom	3 February 1919	New Amsterdam Theatre
Angel Face	Musical play	3 acts	Book by Harry B. Smith; based on the play The Elixir of Love by Zellah Covington and Jules Simonson; Lyrics by Robert B. Smith	19 December 1919	Knickerbocker Theatre
My Golden Girl	Musical comedy	2 acts	Book and lyrics by Frederick Arnold Kummer	2 February 1919	Nora Bayes Theatre
Oui Madame				1920	
The Girl in the Spotlight	operetta	2 acts and 5 scenes	Book and lyrics by Richard Bruce	12 July 1920	Knickerbocker Theatre
Orange Blossoms	Musical comedy	3 acts	Book by Fred de Grésac based on the play La Passerelle by Fred de Grésac and François de Croisset; Lyrics by Buddy G. DeSylva	19 September 1922	Fulton Theatre
The Dream Girl	Musical comedy	3 acts and 6 scenes	Book by Rida Johnson Young and Harold Atterbridge based on the play The Road to Yesterday by Beulah Marie Dix and Evelyn Greenleaf Sutherland	20 August 1924	Ambassadors Theatre

== Other works ==
=== Orchestral music ===
- Serenade for string orchestra, Op.12 (1884)
- Irish Rhapsody (1892)
- American Fantasy (or Fantasia) (1893) (Originally written for band)
- Badinage (1895)
- Suite Romantique, Op.31 (1900)
1. Visions
2. Aubade
3. Triomphe d'Amour
4. Fête Nuptial
- Hero and Leander, Op.33 (1901)
- Auditorium Festival March (1901)
- Pan Americana: Morceau characteristique (1901)
- Suite Woodland Fancies, Op.34 (1902)
1. Morning of the Mountains
2. Forest Sylphs
3. Twilight
4. Autumn Frolics
- Suite Columbus, Op.35 (1904)
1. Dawn and Sunrise in Alhambra
2. At la Rabida (At the Convent)
3. Murmurs of the sea
4. Triumph: The vision of Columbus
- Indian Summer: An American Idyll (1919)
- Three pieces for string orchestra (1912–1922)
1. Air de Ballet
2. Forget-me-not
3. Sunset
- Suite of Serenades (1924)
1. Chinese
2. Spanish
3. Cuban
4. Oriental

=== Concerto pieces ===
- Suite for Cello and Orchestra, Op.3 (1882)
1. Allegro Moderato
2. Scherzo
3. Andante
4. Serenade: Andantino grazioso
5. Tarantelle
- Cello Concerto No.1, Op.8 in D Major (1882)
- Fantastia on "The Desire" (Schubert) for Cello and Orchestra (1891)
- Fantasia on Cavalleria rusticana (Mascagni) for Violin and Orchestra (1893)
- Légende for Cello and Orchestra (1893)
- Cello Concerto No.2, Op.30 in E minor (1894)
- Five pieces for Cello and Orchestra (1900) (arrangement from Sam Dennison and Orchestrated by Lynn Harrell)
1. Yesterthoughts, Op.37
2. Pensée amoureuse
3. Puchinello, Op.38
4. Ghazel
5. The Mountainbrook
- L'Encore for Flute, Clarinet and Orchestra (1910)

=== Chamber music ===
Cello and piano

- Berceuse (1884)
- Scherzino (1885)
- Three pieces (1900–1906)
1. Romance
2. Pensée Amoureuse
3. Petite Valse
- La Serenata (1911)
- Alla Mazurka
- Bagatelle
- Polonaise

Violin and piano

- A La Valse (1915)
- Canzonetta, Opus 12, No. 4 (1928)
- Little Red Lark (an arrangement of an old Irish melody)
- Mirage

Other

- Reveré for English Horn and French Horn Quartet

=== Piano ===
- Serenade 4 May (1884)
- La Ghazel: Improvisation (1900)
- La Coquette: Valze Brilliante (1900)
- The Mountainbrook: Imitative (1900)
- On the Promenade: Morceau (1900)
- Yesterthoughts: Meditation, Op.37 (1900)
- Puchinello: Characteristic, Op.38 (1900)
- Pan Americana: Morceau characteristique (1901)
- Whispering Willows: Intermezzo (1915)
- Devotion (A Love Sonnet for the Piano) (1921)
- Duo (1923)
- Fleurette: Waltz (1903)
- Indian Summer: An American Idyll (1919)
- Marion Davies March (1922)
- Under the Elms, Souvenir de Saratoga
- World's Progress March (1916)

=== Cantata and choral works ===
- Call to Freedom (aka God Shall Guide Us, 1918)
- The Captive, op. 25 (1892; contata for soprano solo, baritone solo, chorus and orchestra)
- Christ Is Risen
- Columbia Anthem (unison chorus with piano, later arr. by Herbert for orchestra and band, 1898)
- Eventide, op. 20 (for male chorus) (from Wanderer's Songs)
- O'Donnell Aboo! (1915)
- Orange, White and Blue (Written for ceremonies in 1916, in commemoration if the landing of the first Dutch settlers on Manhattan Island, May 4, 1626. The orange, white and blue flag of this Dutch colony was raised at Battery Park.)
- The Cruiskeen Lawn (dedicated to the Mendelsohn Glee Club, N. Y., 1913)
- The Hail of the Friendly Sons (for men's voices, a cappella, 1913)
- The New Ireland (for men's voices, a cappella, 1914)
- The Sunken City, op. 20, no. 1 (for men's voices, a cappella, 1897)
- Widow Machree (by Samuel Lover; arr. by Herbert, 1915)

=== Songs ===
- "Ah! Love Me" ("Nur du bist's") (1888)
- "Love's Token" ("Liebesleben") (1888)
- "The Silent Rose" ("Die stille Rose") (1888)
- "My Heart Is True" ("Mien Herz ist treu") (1891)
- "Under an Oak" (1894)
- "When I Was Born I Weighed Ten Stone" (1894)
- "In Dreamland" (1895)
- "Jenny's Baby" (1895)
- "Me and Nancy" (1895)
- "What Is Love?" (1895)
- "Fairy Tales" (1897)
- "I Envy the Bird" (1897)
- "The Secret" (1897)
- "The Tattooed Man" (1897)
- "Gypsy Love Song" (1898)
- "Mary's Lamb" (1898)
- "The Serenades of All Nations" (1898)
- "Hear Me" (1900)
- "We'll Catch You at Last, Tivolini" (1900)
- "Barney O'Flynn" (1903)
- "I Can't Do the Sum" (1903)
- "Toyland" (1903)
- "March of the Toys" (1903)
- "If I Were on the Stage" (1905)
- "When the Cat's Away the Mice Will Play" (1905)
- "Moonbeams" (1906)
- "The Streets of New York" (1906)
- "Love Laid His Sleepless Head" (1907)
- "The Friars' Song" (1907)
- "Ask Her While the Band Is Playing" (1908)
- "Love Is Like a Cigarette" (1908)
- "Won't You Be My Valentine?" (1908)
- "I Want to Be a Good Lamb" (1909)
- "Ah! Sweet Mystery of Life" (1910)
- "I'm Falling in Love with Some One" (1910)
- "Italian Street Song" (1910)
- "Naughty Marietta" (1910)
- "'Neath the Southern Moon" (1910)
- "To the Land of My Own Romance" (1911)
- "Love's Hour" (1912) (lyrics by Rida Johnson Young)
- "Sweethearts" (1913)
- "If Love Were What the Rose Is" (1914)
- "The Love of the Lorelei" (1914)
- "When You're Away" (1914)
- "Remembrance" (1915) (lyrics by Carl Weitbrecht)
- "Sweet Harp of the Days" (1915)
- "An Easter Dawn" (1917)
- "I Might Be Your 'Once-in-a-While'" (1919)
- "Indian Summer" (1919) (originally a piano melody, later lyrics by Al Dubin)
- "Molly" (1919)
- "My Day Has Come" (1920) (lyrics by Irving Caesar)
- "Equity Star" (1921) (lyrics by Grant Stewart)
- "A Kiss in the Dark" (1922)
- "Dream On" (1922)
- "Lora Lee Joseph" (1922)
- "Mary Came Over to Me" (1922)
- "When Knighthood Was in Flower" (1922)
- "God Spare the Emerald Isle" (1923)
- "Little Old New York" (1923)
- "Heart o' Mine" (1924)

==== Songs of unknown date ====
- "A Maiden Went into the Field Alone"
- "Confession"
- "Flower of My Heart"
- "Fly Away, Little Bird"
- "Fowling"
- "Give Your Heart in June-time"
- "If You But Knew"
- "I Love You"
- "Longing for Home"
- "Love Song"
- "Love's Life"
- "Love's Oracle Edward Peple"
- "Our Ireland Shall Be Free"
- "Only You"
- "Peace"
- "Spring Song"
- "The Faded Rose"
- "The First Kiss"
- "The Innkeeper's Daughter"
- "To Thee, My Queen of Beauty"
