= Draw =

Draw, drawing, draws, or drawn most commonly refer to:

- Draw (terrain), a terrain feature formed by two parallel ridges or spurs with low ground in between them
- Draw (tie), in a competition, where competitors achieve equal outcomes
- Drawing, the imparting or production of an image on a surface
- To select, pull, or take:
  - A part of a card game, to "draw" a card
  - A part of a lottery, to "draw" a lottery number
  - A part of venipuncture, to "draw" a blood sample
  - The act of wielding a bladed weapon by removing it from a scabbard, to "draw" a knife, dagger, or sword
  - The act of wielding a firearm by removing it from a holster, to "draw" a handgun

Draw and related terms may also refer to:

== Arts, entertainment, and media ==
=== Music ===
- Drawn (album), a 1998 album by Regina Velasquez
- Draw, the 2001 debut album of Matthew Jay
- "The Draw", a 2013 song by Bastille (band)
- "Draw", a 2022 song by Ichillin'

=== Other arts, entertainment, and media ===
- Draw!, a 1984 comedy-western film
- Drawn (series), a video game series by Big Fish Studios

== Computing and technology ==
- Direct read after write (DRAW)
- OpenOffice.org Draw, a vector graphics editor
- Rendering (computer graphics), sometimes referred to as drawing

== People ==
- Stefanie Draws (born 1989), German footballer

== Sports and games ==
- Bow draw, in archery, the act of pulling back the string of a bow before loosing an arrow
- Draw (chess), a "drawn" or tied outcome in chess
- Draw (poker), the act of taking a card from the dealer in poker
  - Draw poker, a poker variant in which each player is dealt a complete hand before the first betting round
- Draw, the schedule of fixtures in a sports league
- Draw play, a type of American football play that "tricks" the defense into thinking a pass is being thrown
- The "draw", another name for the face-off in team sports such as ice hockey and lacrosse

== Other uses ==
- Drawing (manufacturing), the use of tensile forces to elongate a workpiece
- Hanged, drawn and quartered, a form of punishment

== See also ==
- Drawing (disambiguation)
- Draft (disambiguation)
- Draft lottery (disambiguation)
- Drawdown (disambiguation)
- Drawer (disambiguation)
- Drew (disambiguation)
- Quick Draw (disambiguation)
