= Draft =

Draft, the draft, or draught may refer to:

== Watercraft dimensions ==
- Draft (hull), the distance from waterline to keel of a vessel
- Draft (sail), degree of curvature in a sail
- Air draft, distance from waterline to the highest point on a vessel

== Selection processes ==
- Draft (politics), groundswell of support to compel a candidate to run for office
- Draft (sports), selection of players for professional sports teams
- Conscription, selection for e.g. military service

== Entertainment ==
- Draft (musician) (born 1986), electronic musician and DJ
- Drafted (comics), a 2007 comic released by Devil's Due Publishing
- The Draft (comics), a 1988 one-shot comic book from Marvel Comics
- The Draft (band), an American punk rock band
- The Draft! (film), a 2023 Indonesian science fiction horror film
- WWE draft, a World Wrestling Entertainment program which drafts superstars to different WWE brands
- Draughts, board game, a.k.a. checkers
- The Draft (The League), the series premiere of the FX (TV channel) television series The League
- Draft (magazine), an American magazine about beer and beer culture

== Heating, cooling, air flow ==
- Draft (boiler), difference between atmospheric pressure and the boiler pressure
- Chimney draught, outgoing flow into chimney of gases from combustion
- Draught excluder, used to eliminate cold draught and slow heat loss
- Mechanical draft, incoming flow of air to burn fuel for a boiler or engine
- Vertical draft, vertical movement of air, which can be dangerous to airplanes

== Finance ==
- Demand draft, a check created by a merchant with a buyer's account number on it, but without the buyer's signature
- Banker's draft, a form of check where the funds are taken directly from the financial institution
- Sight draft, or time draft, an order for the payment of money by a banker

== Other uses ==
- Draught beer or other beverage, served from a bulk keg or cask rather than a bottle or can
- Draft (engineering), the angle added to features perpendicular to the parting line of a casting or molding
- Draft (aerodynamics), two objects in close proximity reducing overall drag
- Draft document, a version of an unfinished document or other written work
- Draft animal, an animal used to perform tasks
  - Draft horse, a large horse bred to be a working animal doing hard tasks such as plowing and other farm labor
  - Draught dog, a variety of working dog used to pull a cart
- Draft (water)
- Draught, an alternate term for a stream

== See also ==
- Drapht (born 1982), Australian hip hop singer
- Drafting (disambiguation)
- Drought (disambiguation)
- Draft lottery (disambiguation)
- Final Draft (disambiguation)
- Checkers (disambiguation), including chequers
- Checker (disambiguation), including chequer
- Check (disambiguation), including cheque
