= The Slim Princess =

The Slim Princess may refer to:

- The Slim Princess, a 1907 novel by George Ade
- The Slim Princess (musical), a 1911 musical by Leslie Stuart and Henry Blossom; based on the novel by Ade
- The Slim Princess (1915 film), silent film based on the musical
- The Slim Princess (1920 film), silent film based on the musical
- Carson and Colorado Railway, which had the nickname Slim Princess
