= Jerome Phillips Uhl =

American painter and opera singer

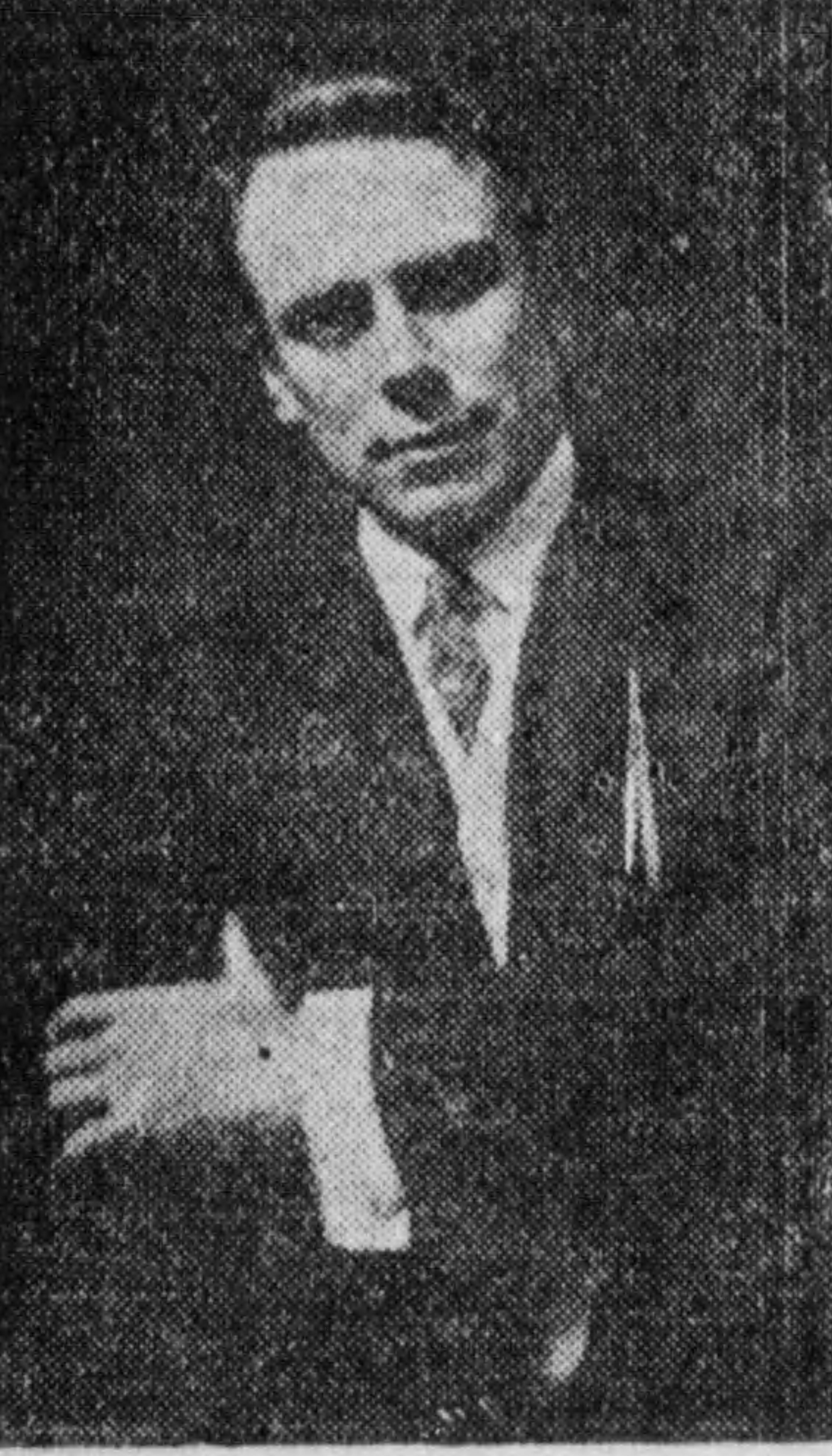
1914 photograph of Jerome Phillips Uhl

Jerome Phillips Uhl (1875, Ohio – April 17, 1951, Washington, D.C.) was an American painter, opera singer, and educator.

== Early life and education ==
Born in Springfield, Ohio, Jerome Phillips Uhl was the son of the painter and American Civil War veteran Silas Jerome Uhl (1841-1916). He went with his family to France at a young age when his father studied in Paris with Augusta Emile, Carolus-Duran, and Puvis de Chavannes. The family's residence in Paris was next to the home of Auguste Rodin, and at the age of four Jerome Phillips Uhl was a model for one of his sculptures of Joan of Arc. After a few years in France, the family moved back to Springfield, Ohio.

In 1888 Uhl moved to Washington D.C. with his family. He spent two years unhappily in universities in Ohio in the mid 1890s; first at Wittenberg College in Springfield and then at Ohio Wesleyan University. He ultimately succeeded in obtaining permission from his father to abandon his academic pursuits in favor of pursuing a career as an artist and he never graduated from either university.

Under the direction of his father, Uhl enrolled in art school in Washington D.C.; studying at the Washington Art League (now the Corcoran School of the Arts and Design) in 1896 and 1897. After completing his education at that school, he pursued further studies at the Art Students League of New York where he participated in The Society of American Fakirs exhibition of 1898; an art show which featured works by the pupils of the Art Students League that parodied the artwork of their professors. He later pursued studies in art at the Académie Julian in Paris, and taught at the Corcoran School of the Arts and Design where one of his pupils was the artist Harry Franklin Waltman.

== Art career ==
Uhl achieved success as a portrait painter and illustrator. He was internationally recognized in the latter medium for his work with several prominent magazines, including Harper's Magazine, Scribner's Magazine, The Century Magazine, and Pearson's Magazine among others. One of his earliest works as an illustrator was as an artist for the 1901 children's Dear Days: A Story of Washington School Life which was published by Henry T. Coates & Co. in Philadelphia. As a portrait artist, he painted many Hollywood celebrities under contract with several of the major studios; including a portrait of Mary Pickford commissioned by Universal Pictures. Others he painted included the actor David Warfield, humorist Irvin S. Cobb, opera singer Lawrence Tibbett, and president Franklin D. Roosevelt. His final portrait of the poet Edna St. Vincent Millay was exhibited at the National Gallery of Art in November 1950.

== Stage career ==
Uhl studied singing with baritone Arthur Griffith Hughes in the United States, before pursuing further vocal training in Italy. A bass-baritone, he made his professional opera debut in Italy in 1907 with the International Opera Company. He first appearance in the United States was in 1911 with the Philadelphia Operatic Society at the Academy of Music as the Slave in Legrand Howland's Sarrona. In 1912 and 1913 he portrayed General Villefranche in the Alfred G. Robyn and Henry Blossom musical All for the Ladies on tour and on Broadway at the Lyric Theatre; a work starring the comedian Sam Bernard.

In the autumn of 1913, Uhl joined the newly created Century Opera Company; making his debut with that organization at the Century Opera House in New York City in October 1913 as Yamadoro in Giacomo Puccini's Madama Butterfly with Ivy Scott in the title role. The following January 1914 he was seen at that theatre as Benvolio in Charles Gounod's Roméo et Juliette with Orville Harrold and Béatrice La Palme in the title parts. Later that year he joined the Aborn English Opera Company with whom he toured the United States as Sparafucile in Giuseppe Verdi's Rigoletto, and Peter the broom maker in Engelbert Humperdinck's Hansel and Gretel. In 1915 he gave a recital at Aeolian Hall in Manhattan to positive reviews in The Sun and New-York Tribune.

In 1917 Uhl performed the title role in Felix Mendelssohn's Elijah in Los Angeles. After this he was a contracted singer with the Chicago Grand Opera Company with whom he portrayed the role of the Herald in the world premiere of Sergei Prokofiev's The Love for Three Oranges on December 30, 1921. After leaving that company in 1922 he joined the voice faculty at the Zoellner Conservatory of Music in Los Angeles.

== Personal life and death ==
In 1899 Uhl began a romantic relationship with Elizabeth Norris, the daughter of Henry Lattimer Norris, of Philadelphia. They married in 1903 and divorced in 1914. They re-married in 1917 only to divorce a second time in 1919. The couple married a third time in 1922.

Jerome Phillips Uhl died on April 17, 1951 in his art studio in Washington, D.C. at the age of 75.
