= Drew =

Drew may refer to:

== Places ==
In the United States

- Drew, Georgia, an unincorporated community
- Drew, Mississippi, a city
- Drew, Missouri, an unincorporated community
- Drew, Oregon, an unincorporated community
- Drew County, Arkansas
- Drew Plantation, Maine

In Canada

- Drew, Ontario, Canada, a farming community

== Schools in the United States ==
- Drew University, Madison, New Jersey
- Drew High School (disambiguation)
- Drew School, a high school in San Francisco, California

== Other uses ==
- Drew (name), a given name and surname
- 23452 Drew, an inner main-belt asteroid
- USS Drew (APA-162), a World War II United States Navy attack transport
- Drew Field, a World War II United States Army Air Forces base in Tampa, Florida
- The Drew Las Vegas, casino under construction in Las Vegas
- Drew Field Municipal Airport, former name for Tampa International Airport (1946-1950)
- "Drew", a song from the 2013 album Tales of Us by English electronic music duo Goldfrapp

== See also ==
- Dru (disambiguation)
- Draw (disambiguation)
- Justice Drew (disambiguation)
