= Our Wives =

Our Wives may refer to:

- Our Wives (film), a 1913 comedy short silent film directed by James Lackaye and based on the play by Wills
- Our Wives (play), a 1912 play by Helen Kraft and Frank Mandel
- Our Wives, a 1910 play by Anthony E. Wills

== See also ==
- Our Wife
- Dulari Bibi, a Hindi language adaptation of the 1913 film Our Wives
- The Only Girl, a Broadway musical adaptation of the play Our Wives
- Our Wives Under the Sea, a 2022 British horror novel
