= Checkers (disambiguation) =

Checkers, or draughts, is a board game.

Checkers or Chequers may also refer to:

== Arts, entertainment and media ==
- Checkers: A Hard Luck Story, a 1896 novel by Henry Blossom
  - Checkers (1913 film), a 1913 lost American silent film with Gertrude Shipman
  - Checkers (play), based on the novel
- Checkers (1919 film), a 1919 lost American melodrama silent film
- Checkers (1937 film), a 1937 American drama film
- Checkers (Marsden novel), a 1996 young-adult fiction novel by Australian author John Marsden
- The Checkers (American band), a doo-wop group of the 1950s
- The Checkers (Japanese band), a Japanese idol group of the 1980s
- Checkers (video game), by Christopher Strachey
- Checkers (1980 video game), an Atari 2600 video game by Activision
- Video Checkers, a 1980 Atari 2600 video game by Atari
- Videocart-19: Checkers, a 1980 video game for the Fairchild Channel F

== Brands and enterprises ==
- Checkers (fast food), an American fast food restaurant chain
- Checkers (supermarket chain), a supermarket chain in South Africa
- Checkers Food Stores, a Channel Islands supermarket chain
- The Checkers (restaurant), in Powys, Wales

== Ice hockey teams ==
- Charlotte Checkers, American Hockey League team
- Charlotte Checkers (1956–1977), an EHL/SHL team
- Charlotte Checkers (1993–2010), an ECHL team
- Columbus Checkers, a former team
- Indianapolis Checkers, a former team
- Oakland Checkers, part of the California Hockey League from 1930 to 1933

== Other uses ==
- Checkers speech, made by Richard Nixon in 1952, mentioning his dog named Checkers
- Chequers, the country residence of the Prime Minister of the United Kingdom
- Chequers plan, a UK Government white paper concerning Brexit
- Checker tree (Sorbus torminalis), a tree species

== See also ==
- Check (disambiguation), including cheque
- Checker (disambiguation), including chequer
