= The Slim Princess (musical) =

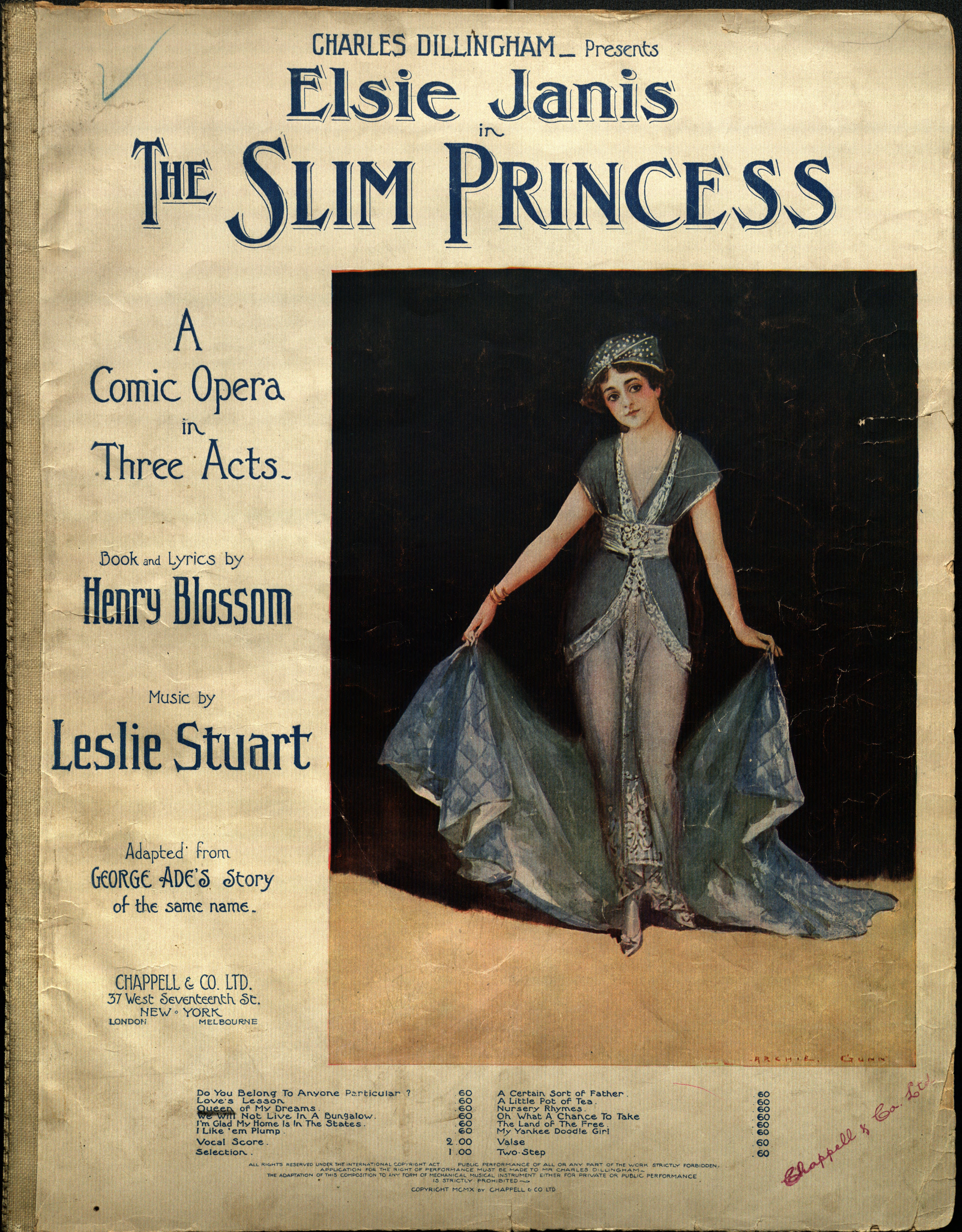
Sheet music cover featuring Elsie Janis

The Slim Princess is a musical in three acts with music by Leslie Stuart and a book and lyrics by Henry Blossom. The musical is an adaptation of George Ade's 1907 novel The Slim Princess. Blossom and Stuart's version of this story was adapted into a silent film first in 1915, and a second time in 1920.

== History ==
The Slim Princess premiered on Broadway on January 2, 1911, at the Globe Theatre. It closed on April 1, 1911, after a 104 performances. The production was produced by Charles Dillingham and directed by Austen Hurgon. William E. MacQuinn served as music director, and the costumes were designed by Percy Anderson. The cast included Elizabeth Brice as Lutie Longstreet, Elsie Janis as Princess Kalora, Charles King as "Tod" Norcross, Joseph Cawthorn as Herr Louis von Schloppenhauer, Charles Judels as Count Luigi Tincagni Tomasso, Arthur J. Engel as Baluchistan, Queenie Vassar as Madame Saidis, Joseph C. Miron as Prince Selim Malagsaki, Julia Frary as Princess Jeneka, Eugene Revere as Harry Romaine, Carl Hayden as Hamdi Pasha, Kate Wingfield as Mrs. Plumston, Ralph Nairn as the Hon. Crawley Plumston, Neil Walton as Bokhara, and Sam Burbank as Tom Golding.

== Song list ==
Act 1

- "When the Guards Go Marching"
- "I Like 'Em Plump"
- "Love's Lesson"
- "A Little Pot of Tea"
- "Kalora's Entrance"
- "My Yankee Doodle Girl" (music by Victor Herbert and John L. Golden, lyrics by Blossom)

Act 2

- "We Will Not Live in a Little Bungalow"
- "Nursery Rhymes"
- "I'm Glad My Home Is in the States"
- "The Land of the Free"
- "Do You Belong to Anyone in Particular"

Act 3

- "A Certain Sort of Father"
- "Oh! what a Chance to Take"
- "Queen of My Dreams"
