= Gold Heels (film) =

1924 film by W. S. Van Dyke

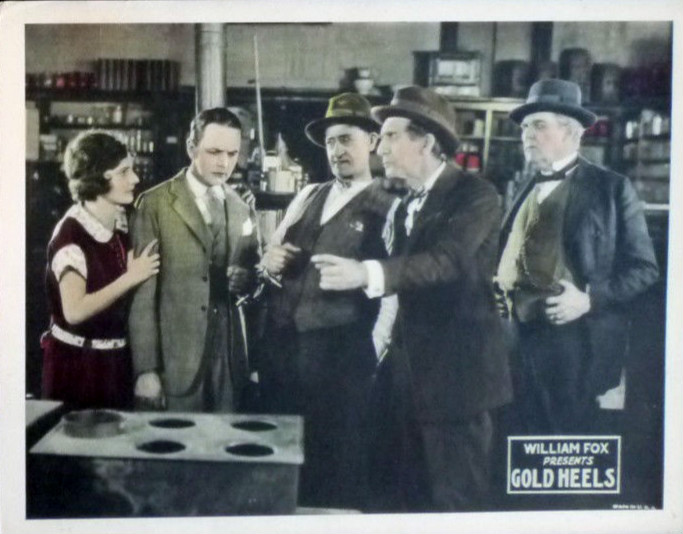
- Lobby card
- Directed by: W. S. Van Dyke
- Written by: Frederick Chapin (story); John Stone (scenario)
- Based on: Checkers: A Hard Luck Story by Henry Martyn Blossom
- Produced by: William Fox
- Starring: Robert Agnew; Peggy Shaw
- Cinematography: Arthur L. Todd
- Distributed by: Fox Film Corporation
- Release date: November 3, 1924
- Running time: 6 reels (6,020 feet)
- Country: United States
- Language: Silent (English intertitles)

Gold Heels is a 1924 American silent drama film produced and distributed by Fox Film Corporation and directed by W. S. Van Dyke. The film is loosely based on legendary racing horse Gold Heels and the 1896 novel Checkers: A Hard Luck Story by Henry Martyn Blossom.

== Plot ==
As described in a review in a film magazine, following a steak of hard luck at the race track, Boots and his pal Push rescue a chap from thugs. Boots takes him to his hometown. He is attracted to a young woman, Pert Barlow, and gets a job in her father's store. Old Barlow owns the broken-down horse, Gold Heels, which Boots buys.

A child dies because of the deplorable conditions at the orphanage and Pert starts a campaign to get a new one. Barlow takes charge of the money but it is stolen. Boots is accused of the theft and is jailed, but his pals get him out. He returns to the city.

On the day of the big race, he and his pals go to the village, take Gold Heels and load him in an automobile, and after a wild ride reach the track and win the race. Boots is vindicated and Old Barlow suggests that he is willing to have him as a son-in-law.

== Cast ==
- Robert Agnew as Boots
- Peggy Shaw as Pert Barlow
- Lucien Littlefield as Push Miller
- William Bailey as Kendall Jr.
- Carl Stockdale as Barlow
- Fred J. Butler as Kendall Sr.
- Harry Tracy as Tobe (credited as Harry Tracey)
- James Douglas
- Winifred Landis
- Catherine Craig (credited as Katherine Craig)
- Buck Black
- Betsy Ann Hisle as Little Jane
- Carole Lombard in a bit part

== Preservation ==
A print of Gold Heels is held at the Museum of Modern Art, New York City.
