= Checkmate (disambiguation) =

Checkmate is a situation in the game of chess and other activities which results in defeat.

Checkmate or Checkmates may also refer to:

== Fiction and drama ==
- Checkmate (comics), the title of two series published by DC Comics
- Checkmate (play), an 1869 farcical play by Andrew Halliday
- Checkmate, an 1871 novel by Sheridan Le Fanu
- Checkmates, a 1987 play by Ron Milner
- Checkmate (Horler novel), a 1930 novel by Sydney Horler
- Checkmate, a short story from A Twist in the Tale
- Checkmate, the fourth novel in the Noughts & Crosses series by Malorie Blackman
- Checkmate, the sixth book in the Lymond Chronicles by Dorothy Dunnett

== Film ==
- Checkmate (1911 film), an American silent short drama film
- Checkmate (1931 French film), a French mystery film directed by Roger Goupillières
- Checkmate (1931 film), a German film
- Checkmate (1935 film), a British film
- Checkmate (2008 film), an Indian film
- Checkmate (2010 film), a Ghanaian film
- Checkmate (2024 film), an Argentine film
- Checkmate (short film), a short drama film
- Checkmates (film), a 2024 Spanish comedy film

== Music ==
- Checkmate (Joe Pass and Jimmy Rowles album), 1981
- Checkmate (Roger Christian album), 1989
- Checkmate (B.G. album), 2000
- Checkmate! (album), 2011
- Check Mate (Barrabás album), 1975
- Checkmate (EP), 2022 EP by Itzy
- "Checkmate" (Jadakiss song), 2005
- "Checkmate" (Jung Yong-hwa and JJ Lin song), 2015
- "Checkmate" (Conan Gray song), 2019
- "Checkmate" (Rod Wave song), 2023
- "Checkmate", a song from the Cypress Hill album Cypress Hill IV
- "Checkmate", a song from the Enhypen extended play The Sin: Bliss
- "Checkmate", a song from the Gryphon album Red Queen to Gryphon Three
- "Checkmate", a song from the Xdinary Heroes extended play Deadlock
- Checkmate (rapper), Canadian hip hop artist
- Checkmates, Ltd., American R&B group

== Television ==
- Checkmate (American TV series), the title of a 1960–1962 American mystery series
- Checkmate (Indian TV series), an Indian Bengali-language series
- Checkmate (2024 Indian TV series), an Indian Hindi-language thriller series
- Checkmate (Nigerian TV series), a Nigerian soap opera
- Chhal – Sheh Aur Maat (lit. 'Deception – Check and Mate'), a 2012 Indian series
- "Checkmate" (The Prisoner), 1967 series episode
- "Checkmate" (The Prisoner 2009), 2009 miniseries episode inspired by the 1967 episode
- "Checkmate" (The Tudors), 2008 episode
- "Checkmate", 2017 series episode of Arrow season 5
- "Checkmate", 2015 series episode of Adventure Time season 7
- "Checkmate", fourth episode of the 1965 Doctor Who serial The Time Meddler
- "Checkmate", 1991 series episode, see list of Twin Peaks episodes

== Other ==
- Checkmate (ballet), the music for ballet by British composer Arthur Bliss
- Checkmate pattern
- Check-mate system, a ship identification protocol used by the Royal Navy in World War II
- Sukhoi Checkmate, a fifth generation Light Tactical Aircraft by Sukhoi
- Chess Champion 2175, a chess video game, also known as Checkmate

== See also ==
- Check (disambiguation)
- Operation Checkmate (disambiguation)
- Jaque Mate (disambiguation)
