= The Yankee Consul (film) =

1924 film

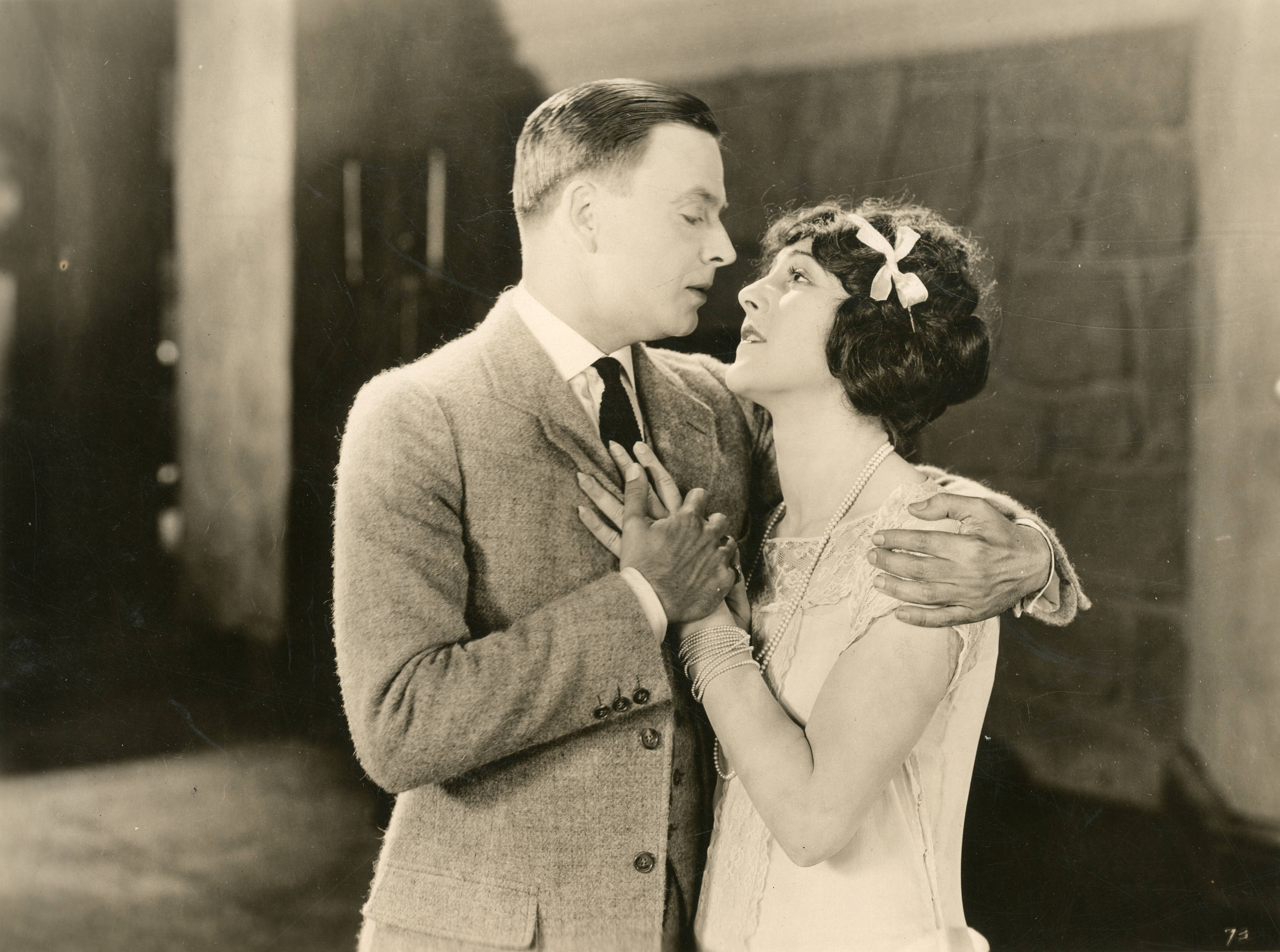
- Still with Douglas MacLean and Patsy Ruth Miller
- Directed by: James W. Horne
- Written by: Raymond Cannon
- Screenplay by: Lewis Milestone; Raymond Griffith
- Based on: The Yankee Consul by Henry Martyn Blossom and Alfred G. Robyn
- Produced by: Douglas MacLean
- Cinematography: Max Dupont
- Edited by: George Crone
- Production company: Douglas MacLean Productions
- Distributed by: Associated Exhibitors
- Release date: February 10, 1924
- Running time: 60 minutes 6 reels, 6242 feet
- Country: United States
- Language: Silent (English intertitles)

The Yankee Consul is a 1924 American black-and-white silent comedy film directed by James W. Horne and written by Raymond Cannon. With a screen adaptation by Lewis Milestone and Raymond Griffith, the film is based upon the 1903 comic opera The Yankee Consul by Alfred G. Robyn and Henry Martyn Blossom.

The film premiered in New York City on February 10, 1924, and had general theatrical release beginning February 24, 1924. It has a 1925 release in Austria as Der Wilde Konsul.

== Plot ==
As described in a film magazine review, the actions of Dudley Ainsworth (Douglas MacLean) cause concern to his friends, who think he just needs to have some work. Jack Morrell (Arthur Stuart Hull) secures him a position at a tourist agency. Sent to a departing steamship to bring off the trunks of the consul to Rio de Janeiro, he finds himself on the high seas with Morrell going to Brazil. To avoid having to shovel coal for his passage, he poses as the American consul whose passage was cancelled. On the ship, he meets Margarita Carrosa (Patsy Ruth Miller). In Rio he gets ashore and in given charge of the consulate, and becomes embroiled in a conspiracy involving Margarita and thieves planning to steal a chest of gold, which she claims she owns, from the American consulate. Margarita is taken hostage by the thieves, and Ainsworth sends word to the U. S. Navy before rushing to an estate where Margarita is being held captive. Ainsworth goes to the castle where the young woman is restrained, gets into a fight, frees Margarita, and chases the villains back to the consulate. The navy Admiral (Eric Mayne) arrives with the real Yankee consul to reveal that the entire set of events was a prank played on Ainsworth by his friends to get him to work. However, he has really become interested in Margarita.

== Cast ==
- Arthur Stuart Hull as Jack Morrell
- Douglas MacLean as Dudley Ainsworth
- Patsy Ruth Miller as Margarita
- Stanhope Wheatcroft as Leopoldo
- Eulalie Jensen as Donna Theresa
- Lee Shumway as Purser of S.S. President
- Fred Kelsey as Agent John J. Doyle
- George Periolat as Don Rafael Desschado
- Eric Mayne as Admiral Rutledge
- Bert Hadley as Servant

== Preservation ==
A print of The Yankee Consul is held in the holdings of Getty Images, and another is rumored to be held in the Gosfilmofond film archive.
