= Elise Reiman =

American ballet dancer and educator

- Elise Reiman, from a 1931 newspaper
- Born: Olga Elise Reiman; October 17, 1911; Terre Haute, Indiana, U.S.
- Died: August 26, 1993 (aged 81); Boston, Massachusetts, U.S.
- Other name: Elise Reiman Hotchkiss
- Occupations: ballet dancer; dance educator
- Spouse: Charles Varner Hotchkiss (m. 1951; died 1963)

Olga Elise Reiman (October 17, 1911 – August 26, 1993) was an American ballet dancer and dance educator. After starting her career working with choreographer Adolph Bolm, she danced at the American Ballet and Ballet Society, both forerunners of the New York City Ballet, and originated several roles for choreographer George Balanchine. Reiman taught at Balanchine's School of American Ballet between 1945 and 1953 and from 1964 until her death.

== Early life and education ==
Reiman was born in Terre Haute, Indiana, the daughter of Ewald E. Reiman and Olga Paulini Reiman. Her father was a bank president. In childhood she studied dance with Ernestine Myers. She later studied under Adolph Bolm in San Francisco. In 1934, Reiman started attending classes at the School of American Ballet in New York, co-founded by choreographer George Balanchine, during the school's second term.

== Career ==
Reiman began her career working with Bolm, and created roles in his ballets Apollon Musagète (1928), as Calliope, and Mechanical Ballet (1931). In 1930, she spent six months in Europe and performed as a guest artist, including at a garden party at Windsor Castle before the King and Queen.

Between 1935 and 1936, she danced at the American Ballet, co-founded by Balanchine and Lincoln Kirstein. She created a role in the first ballet Balanchine choreographed in the United States, Serenade, followed by Reminiscence, Transcendance and Alma Mater (all 1935), the latter performed on Broadway. Also in 1935, she performed in the American premiere of Balanchine's Mozartiana. During this period, due to American Ballet's association with the Metropolitan Opera, she also danced in opera ballets that featured choreography by Balanchine, including Delibes's Lakmé, Hageman's Caponsacchi and Ponchielli's La Gioconda. In 1937, Reiman danced in the first revival of Balanchine's Apollo as Terpsichore.

After Balanchine moved to the West Coast in 1938, Reiman remained in New York, and performed in Broadway shows throughout the early 1940s, including Liberty Jones (1941), The Lady Comes Across and Rosalinda (both 1942). In 1945, Reiman was recruited to teach junior students at the School of American Ballet, and became the first alumna to teach at the school.

In 1946, Reiman joined the Ballet Society, co-founded by Balanchine and Kirstein, after the former's return to New York. On November 20, the company's first performance, Reiman originated roles in Balanchine's The Four Temperaments, in which she danced in the second theme opposite Lew Christensen, and The Spellbound Child. In 1947, she originated roles in Balanchine's Divertimento (now known as Haieff Divertimento), John Taras's The Minotaur and William Dollar's Highland Fling. In 1948, she appeared in the American premiere of Balanchine's Symphony in C, in which she danced in the fourth movement alongside Christensen. Later that year, after Balanchine and Kirstein founded the New York City Ballet, she retired from performing.

Reiman left the School of American Ballet in 1953, but returned in 1964, after her husband's sudden death and at Balanchine's invitation. She taught children's and beginning pointe classes. In 1992, she was awarded the school's Mae L. Wien Faculty Award for distinguished service. She continued teaching at the school until her death in 1993. Fellow Balanchine ballerina Maria Tallchief called Reiman "the bridge between generations, an important connection... She understood his passion for the classical principles he learned at the Imperial Ballet School in St. Petersburg and brought to this country. She was part of the line of succession".

== Personal life ==
Reiman married Charles Varner Hotchkiss in 1951; he died in 1963.

On August 26, 1993, Reiman died from an aneurysm, in Boston, at age 81.
