= The Yankee Consul =

The Yankee Consul, also known as the Lieutenant Commander, is a comic opera in two acts with music by Alfred G. Robyn and a libretto by Henry Blossom. The opera premiered in Boston on 21 September 1903 at the Tremont Theatre. The premiere production was produced by Boston opera impresario Henry Wilson Savage, and starred Raymond Hitchcock as Abijah Booze. The work was staged on Broadway the following year at the 41st Street Broadway Theatre where it ran for a total of 114 performances from February 22, 1904, through July 2, 1904. The opera was adapted into a 1921 silent film of the same name.
