= Chek =

Chek or CHEK may refer to:

- Chek (brand), soft drink brand of Winn-Dixie
- Chek (unit), Cantonese pronunciation of a traditional Chinese unit of length
- CHEK-DT, a TV station in Victoria, British Columbia, Canada
- places in Kyrgyzstan:
  - Chek, Batken, in Batken District, Batken Region
  - Chek, Bazar-Korgon, in Bazar-Korgon District, Jalal-Abad Region
  - Chek, Suzak, in Suzak District, Jalal-Abad Region
- Quick Chek, a chain of convenience stores based in New Jersey
- Sport Chek, Canadian retailer of sports clothing and equipment

== See also ==
- Check (disambiguation)
- The Cheks, an Australian band
