= Drawer (disambiguation) =

Drawer is a component of furniture.

Drawer or Drawers may also refer to:

- Someone who engages in drawing
- Payor, a person who draws a bill of exchange
- Drawers (undergarment), underwear for the lower body
  - Open drawers, long underwear for the lower body
  - Drawers (trousers), under layer of trousers
- Drawer test, a diagnostic test
- Drawer, a graphical user interface widget
- Drawer, a file system directory in AmigaOS's Workbench

== See also ==
- Draw (disambiguation)
