= Wreckless (film) =

- Directed by: William A. Shilling
- Starring: Patricia Morison
- Cinematography: R.G. Ganstrom; V.L. Herman
- Release date: 1935
- Running time: 17 minutes
- Country: United States
- Language: English

Wreckless is a 1935 American short film directed by William A. Shilling and starring Patricia Morison. It was Morison's screen debut.

== Premise ==
Mary Jane is a young woman who falls for an automobile salesman whose 75-miles-per-hour speeding gets him in trouble with the law. Under arrest, he persuades Mary Jane to ask her father's attorney to represent him.

== Cast ==
- Martin Griffith as Jack Wade
- Patricia Morison as Mary Jane
- Robert T. Haines as Attorney Knowlton
- John T. Dwyer as C. Vincent Clark
- Thomas W. Ross as The Judge
