= Our Wife =

Our Wife may refer to:

- Our Wife (1931 film), an American pre-Code comedy film
- Our Wife (1941 film), an American romantic comedy film

== See also ==
- Our Wives
