= Drawing (disambiguation) =

Drawing is a visual art that involves marking a two-dimensional medium.

Drawing may also refer to:

== Visual arts ==
- Technical drawing, technical drawings relating to engineering.
- Architectural drawing, technical and illustrative drawings relating to architecture.
- Life drawing, artistic exercise studying the human figure - often but not necessarily unclothed.
- Still-life drawing, drawn artistic depiction of inanimate objects.
- Google Drawings, a free, basic online drawing program.

== Other uses ==
- Drawing lots, a way of making a random choice between participants.
- Drawing (manufacturing), a metalworking process.
  - Wire drawing
- Drawing money or dividends from a company or financial institution.
  - Special drawing rights from the IMF
- Drawing (poker), having a hand that needs further cards to become valuable.
- Taking a playing card from the deck.
- Disemboweling or dragging, in the medieval English punishment hanged, drawn and quartered.
- "Drawing" (Barenaked Ladies song), 2008
- "Drawing", an instrumental song by Linkin Park from LP Underground 9: Demos.

== See also ==
- Draw (disambiguation)
- Drawing straws
- DrawingML
- Sortition - drawing lots
