= Ernestine Myers =

American dancer

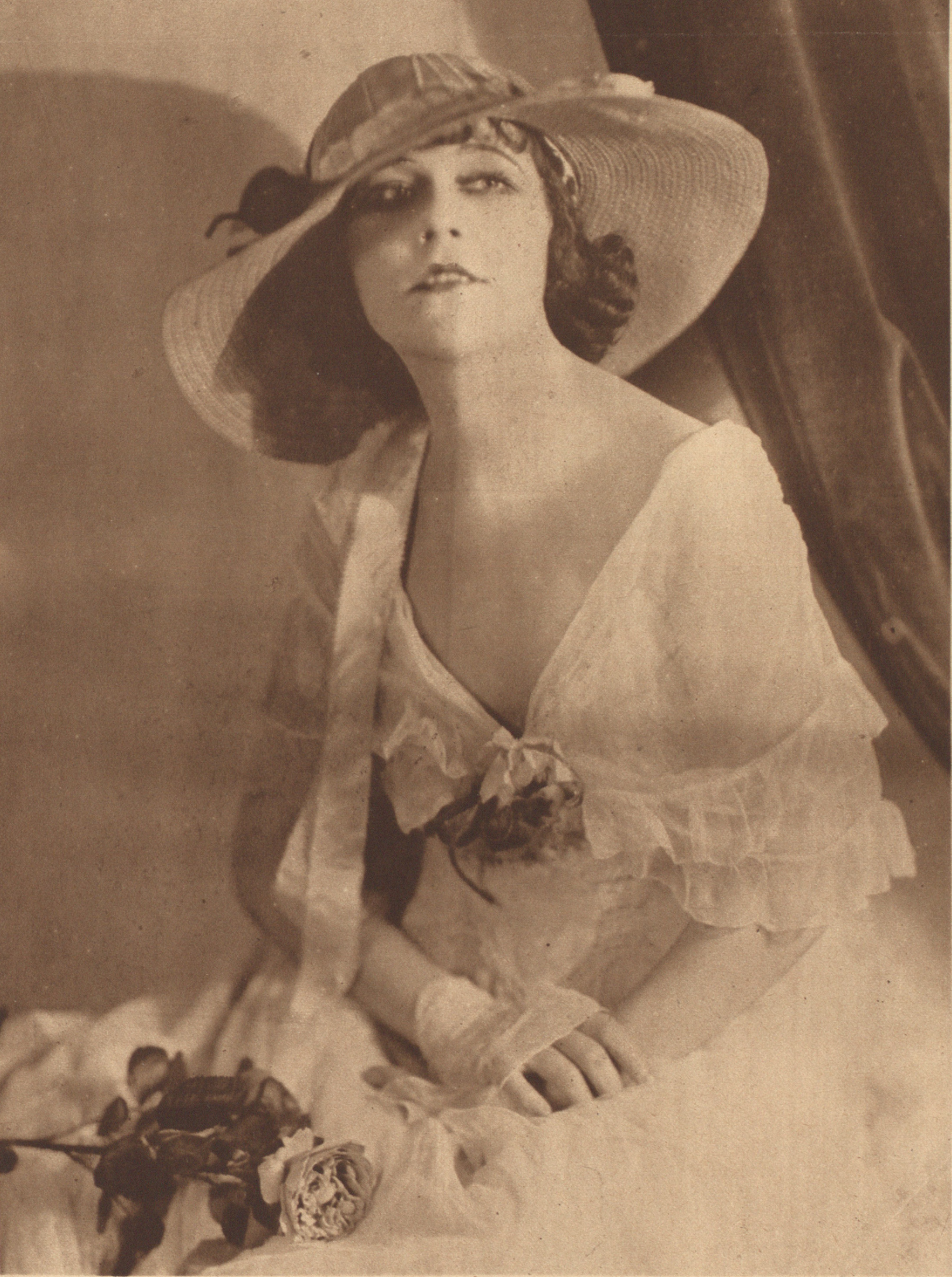
- Ernestine Myers
- Born: January 7, 1900; Terre Haute, Indiana
- Died: June 29, 1991 (aged 91); Terre Haute, Indiana
- Other names: Ernestine Myers Morrissey
- Occupations: Dancer, vaudeville performer, dance educator
- Parent: Al Myers

Ernestine Myers Morrissey (January 7, 1900 – June 29, 1991), sometimes credited as Ernestine Meyers, was an American dancer, Ziegfeld girl, and dance educator.

== Early life ==
Myers was born in Terre Haute, Indiana, the daughter of professional baseball player Al Myers and Flora LaTart Myers. She trained as a dancer at the Chicago Musical College, then pursued further dance studies with Ruth St. Denis and Ted Shawn in Los Angeles.

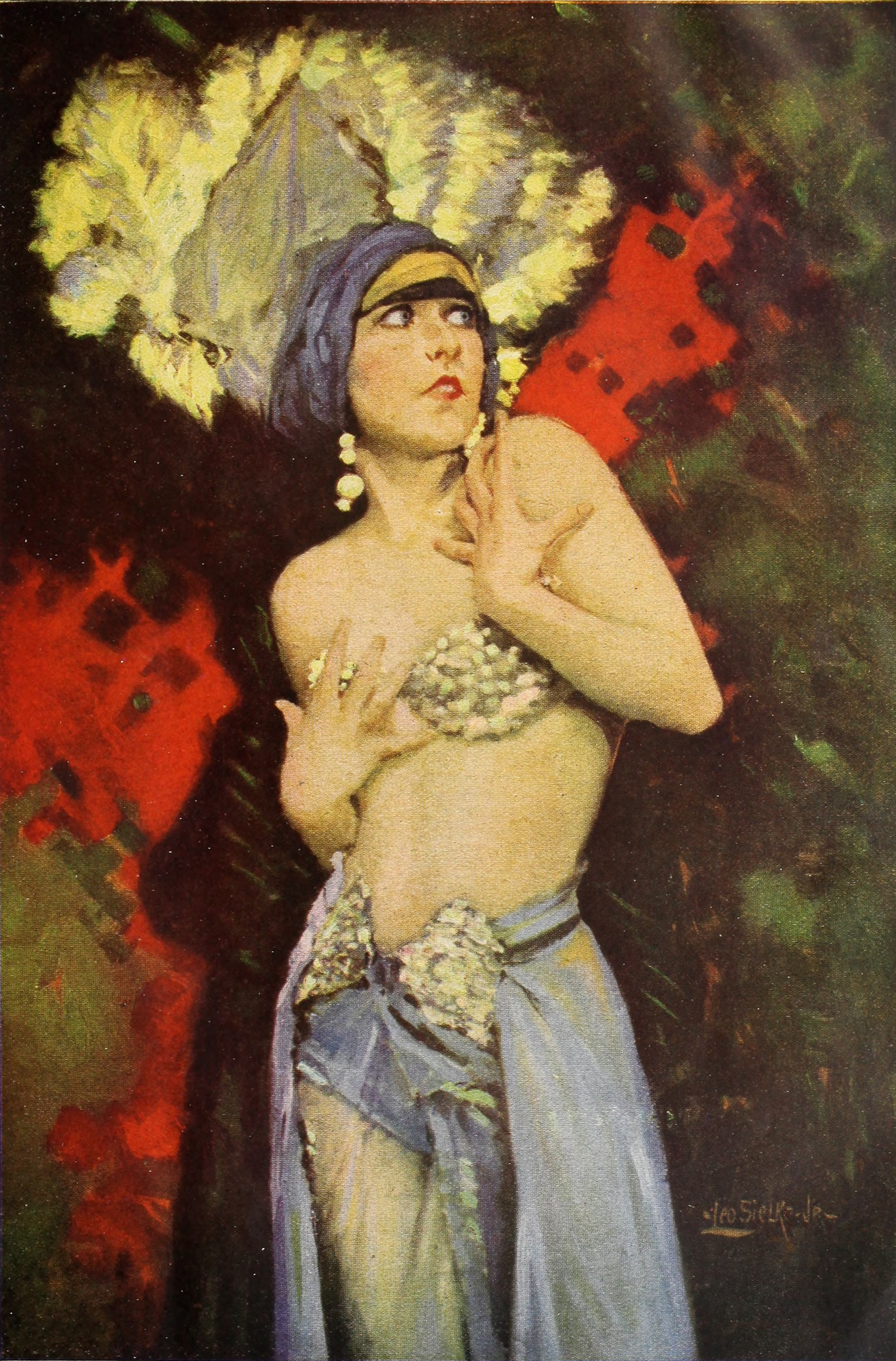
Ernestine Myers - Jan 1920 Shadowland

== Career ==
Myers appeared on Broadway and on vaudeville stages. She toured with Ruth St. Denis's dance company, which also featured Martha Graham, Florence O'Denishawn, and Doris Humphrey at the time. In 1917 she toured in a singing and dancing act with Carl Randall, including "a pseudo Egyptian fox trot in costume with just enough burlesque in it to give it pep," noted reviewer Giles P. Cain. She wore a purple wig while performing in 1921, creating a "weirdly beautiful" effect, according to Billboard magazine. Her credits included roles in the shows Sinbad (1918), Follow the Girl (1918), Silks and Satins (1920), and Ziegfeld Follies. "Miss Myers is a splendid dancer, and works hard to put her selections over," commented one reviewer in 1921.

From 1923 to 1978, Myers ran a dance school in her hometown. She produced, choreographed, and designed costumes and lighting for the school's biennial revue, which included over two hundred performers in some years. Elise Reiman, a teacher at the School of American Ballet, was one of Myers' many students. In 1976, her photo was part of a Bicentennial salute to American theatre at the Kennedy Center in Washington, D.C. In 1980 she gave an oral history interview for the Vigo County Oral History Project.

== Personal life ==
Myers married Chicago businessman Daniel E. Morrissey in 1948. Her husband died in 1949, and she died in 1991, in Terre Haute, aged 91 years.
