= Checker =

Checker or chequer or variant, may refer to:

== People ==
- Chubby Checker (born 1941), American singer-songwriter best known for popularizing The Twist
- Emma Checker (born 1996), Australian footballer

== Arts, entertainment, and media ==
- Checker, a game piece in the board game Checkers (UK: draughts)
- Checker Records, a record label

== Brands and enterprises ==
- Checker Motors Corporation, built Checker taxis
- Checker Taxi, a taxi service founded by Morris Markin
- Checker Marathon

== Other uses ==
- Check (pattern), also called checker or checkered, a pattern consisting of squares of alternating colors
- Checker, the action that produces checkering, a surface applied to wooden gunstocks to provide a non-slip grip (see Gunsmith)
- Another term for retail clerk.

== See also ==
- Checkerboard
- Checkers (disambiguation), including chequers
- Check (disambiguation), including cheque
- Draft (disambiguation), including draught
