= Al Myers =

American baseball player (1863–1927)

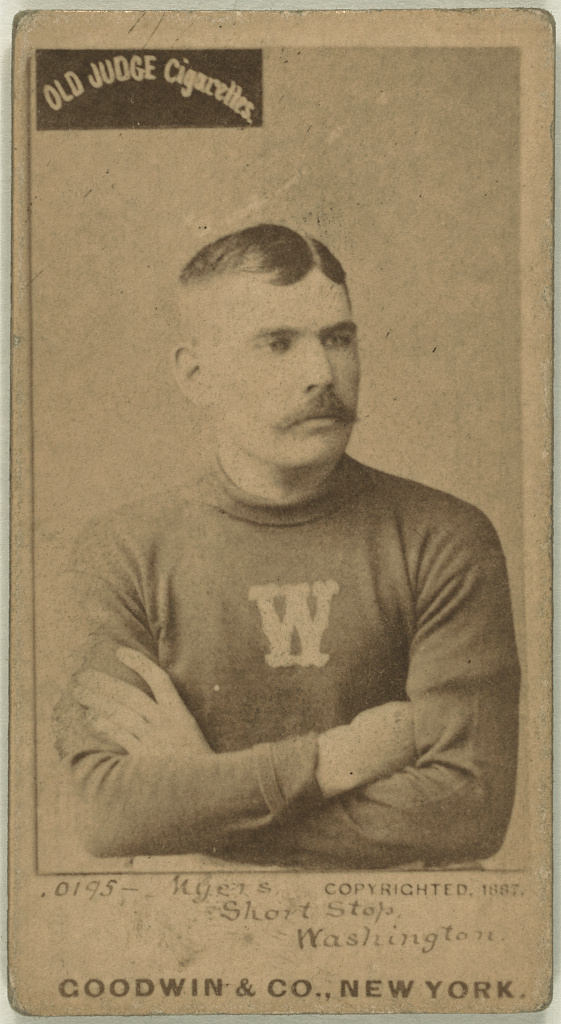
- Second baseman
- Born: October 22, 1863; Danville, Illinois
- Died: December 24, 1927 (aged 64); Marshall, Illinois
- Batted: Right Threw: Right

MLB debut
- September 27, 1884, for the Milwaukee Brewers

Last MLB appearance
- October 3, 1891, for the Philadelphia Phillies

MLB statistics
- Batting average: .246
- Home runs: 0
- Runs batted in: 36
- Stats at Baseball Reference

Teams
- Milwaukee Brewers (1884); Philadelphia Quakers (1885); Kansas City Cowboys (1886); Washington Nationals (1887–89); Philadelphia Quakers/Phillies (1889–91)

James Albert Myers (October 22, 1863 – December 24, 1927) was a Major League Baseball second baseman from 1884-1891. Known as "Cod" Myers, he owned the Health Office Saloon and built an apartment house in Terre Haute, Indiana. Myers's daughter, Ernestine Myers, pursued a successful career in professional dance. He played for the Milwaukee Brewers, Philadelphia Quakers/Phillies, Kansas City Cowboys, and Washington Nationals.
