= All for the Ladies =

Musical by Robyn and Blossom

All for the Ladies is a musical with music by Alfred G. Robyn and both lyrics and book by Henry Blossom. The musical premiered on Broadway at the Lyric Theatre on December 30, 1912. It closed on April 5, 1913, after 112 performances. The musical was created as a starring vehicle for comedian Sam Bernard who portrayed the central character of Leon von Laubenheim of Pantural, Clemente & Co. The production also starred Adele Ritchie as Nancy Panturel, Alice Gentle as Georgette Clemente, and Jerome Uhl as General Villefranche. The musical is set in France.
