= Without Limit =

1921 film

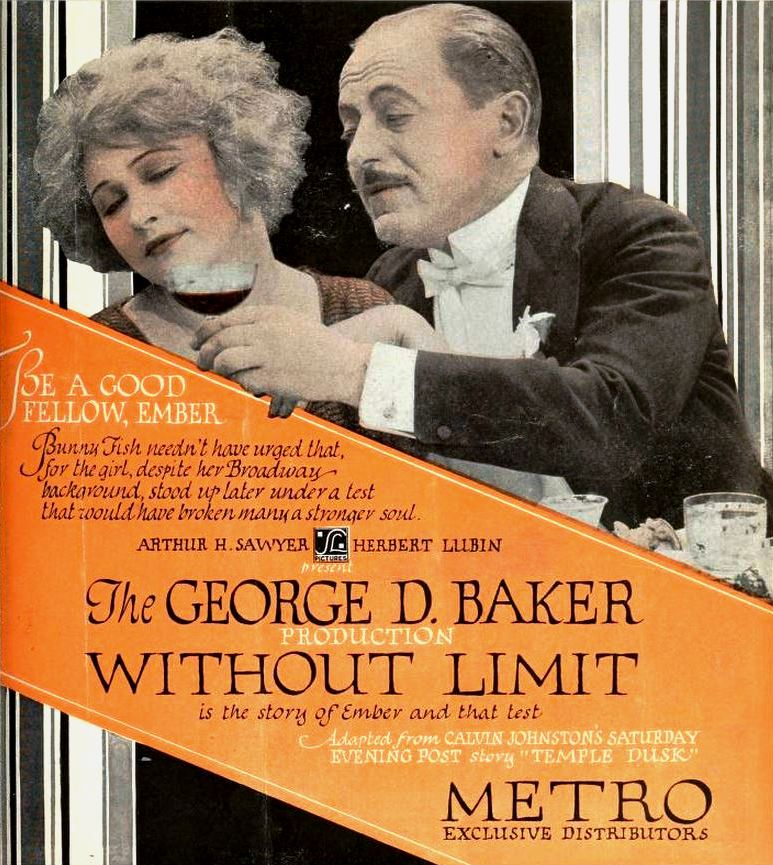
- Ad for film with Anna Q. Nilsson and Robert Schable
- Directed by: George D. Baker
- Written by: George D. Baker
- Based on: The Temple of Dusk by Calvin Johnston
- Starring: Anna Q. Nilsson; Robert Frazer
- Cinematography: Andre Barlatier
- Production company: Metro Pictures
- Distributed by: Metro Pictures
- Release date: March 20, 1921
- Running time: 7 reels
- Country: United States
- Language: Silent (English intertitles)

Without Limit is a 1921 American silent drama film produced and distributed by Metro Pictures. It was directed by George D. Baker and stars Anna Q. Nilsson. The film is based on the story The Temple of Dusk by Calvin Johnston that was published in The Saturday Evening Post.

A surviving print is held at the British Film Institute (BFI) National Film and Television Archive.

== Plot ==
Based upon a summary in a film publication, a minister's son, David Marlowe, gets drunk and marries chorus girl Ember, and then forges a check and flees. Ember then decides to leave the straight and narrow path and charges some gowns to Bunny Fish, the man her husband had robbed. When she hears that her husband has returned with money to repay his debt, she changes her mind and returns the clothing. Later, when she believes David has killed Bunny Fish because of his attention towards her, but it turns out that Fish is only slightly hurt. Palter, the owner of the establishment where David first got intoxicated, has become so interested in David's regeneration that he remembers him in his will, and just before he dies, he also signs over some bonds to Ember after learning that she has remained faithful to her husband.

== Cast ==
- Anna Q. Nilsson as Ember Edwards
- Robert Frazer as David Marlowe
- Frank Currier as The Reverend Marlowe
- Kate Blancke as Mrs. Marlowe
- Charles Lane as Clement Palter
- Robert Schable as Bunny Fish
- Thomas W. Ross as Charley
- Nellie Anderson as The Landlady
