= Check =

Check, checks, checked, or checking, may refer to:

== Finance ==
- Cheque ("check" in U.S. English), an order for transfer of money
- Rain check, an idiom from baseball meaning a deferral
- Check, an invoice presented to a diner at the end of a meal
- Check (mobile app), a mobile banking application
- Checking/cheque/chequing/transaction account, a kind of bank account

== Arts, entertainment, and media ==
=== Games and sports ===
- Check (poker), declining to bet
- Casino chip, less commonly referred to as a check
- Check (chess), a threat to capture the king or general
- Checking (ice hockey), several techniques

=== Music ===
- The Checks (band), a New Zealand band
- "Check" (Meek Mill song), 2015
- "Check" (Young Thug song), 2015
- "Check", a song by bbno$, 2025
- "Check", a song by Chris Janson from Real Friends, 2019
- "Check", a song by E-40 from The D-Boy Diary: Book 1, 2016
- "Check", a song by Flo from Access All Areas, 2024
- "Check", a song by Girls' Generation from Lion Heart, 2015
- "Check", a song by Kojo Funds featuring Raye from Golden Boy, 2018
- "Check", a song by Lil Durk from Lil Durk 2X, 2016
- "Check", a song by Max Webster from Universal Juveniles, 1980
- "Check", a song by Nas and Rick Ross from the soundtrack to Creed II, 2015
- "Check", a song by Quin NFN, from 4Nun, 2019
- "Check", a song by Qveen Herby from EP 8, 2020
- "Check", a song by Rustic Overtones from Rooms by the Hour, 1998
- "Check", a song by U.S.D.A. from Cold Summer, 2007
- "Check", a song by Zebrahead from Waste of Mind, 1998
- "Check (Let's Ride)", a song by Lil' Flip from U Gotta Feel Me, 2004

=== Other media ===
- Check (film), a 2021 Indian Telugu-language film
- "The Check" (The Amazing World of Gumball), a 2015 episode of The Amazing World of Gumball
- The Checks (episode), a 1996 TV episode of Seinfeld

== Patterns ==
- Check (pattern) (or "Chequered"), a pattern of squares such as that used on chess boards, fabrics
- Tartan or plaid, a checked pattern in fabric and weaving

== Other uses ==
- Check mark, a symbol used to indicate completion, verification, or selection
  - Checkbox, a type of widget in computing
- Checked baggage, luggage or parcels placed by an airline or train for transportation in the hold or baggage car
- Check, Virginia, an unincorporated community in the United States

== See also ==
=== Derived terms ===
- Checklist
- Check sheet
- Checker (disambiguation)
- Checkers (disambiguation)
- Checkmate (disambiguation)
- Cross check (disambiguation)

=== Homophones ===
- Chek (disambiguation)
- Czech (disambiguation)

=== Synonyms ===
- Test (disambiguation)
