= A Full House =

1915 play by Frederick J. Jackson

A Full House is a farce in three acts by Frederick J. Jackson. A comedy of errors, the play centers around the theft of a ruby necklace and relies heavily upon slapstick and physical comedy. It premiered on Broadway at the Longacre Theatre on May 10, 1915. It closed at that theatre in August 1915 after 112 performances.

The production was produced by Harry Frazee, directed by Edward MacGregor, and starred Edgar Norton as Parkes, May Vokes as Susie, Ralph Morgan as Ned Pembroke Jr., Elizabeth Nelson as Ottilie Howell, Maude Turner Gordon as Mrs. Winnecker, Claiborne Foster as Daphne Charters, Herbert Corthell as Nicholas King, George Parsons as George Howell, Bernice Buck as the show girl Vera Venon, and Hugh Cameron as the policeman Jim Mooney.

== Adaptations ==
It was adapted by Henry Blossom and Victor Herbert into the 1919 Broadway musical The Velvet Lady. It was also adapted into a 1920 silent film, A Full House.
