= Checkers (play) =

Play by Henry Blossom

Checkers is a play by Henry Blossom. Adapted by Blossom from his 1896 novel Checkers: A Hard Luck Story, the play was performed on Broadway in 1903 and again in 1904. It was adapted into a film twice.

== History ==
Checkers was originally conceived as a project to feature the talents of William Collier Sr.; an actor who had convinced the novelist to turn the work into a play for him. However, once completed, Collier backed out of the project and the part of "Checkers" went to a then relatively unknown Thomas W. Ross. Ross had tremendous success in the role, and it launched his career.

Checkers premiered at the National Theatre in Washington, D.C., on September 21, 1903. It transferred to Broadway's American Theatre where it opened on September 28, 1903. It closed in after 48 performance in November 1903 to go on tour, but returned in New York City for performances at the Academy of Music in 1904.

== 1913 film ==
Eustace Hale Ball and Lawrence McGill wrote the screenplay.
