= Thomas W. Ross =

American stage and film actor

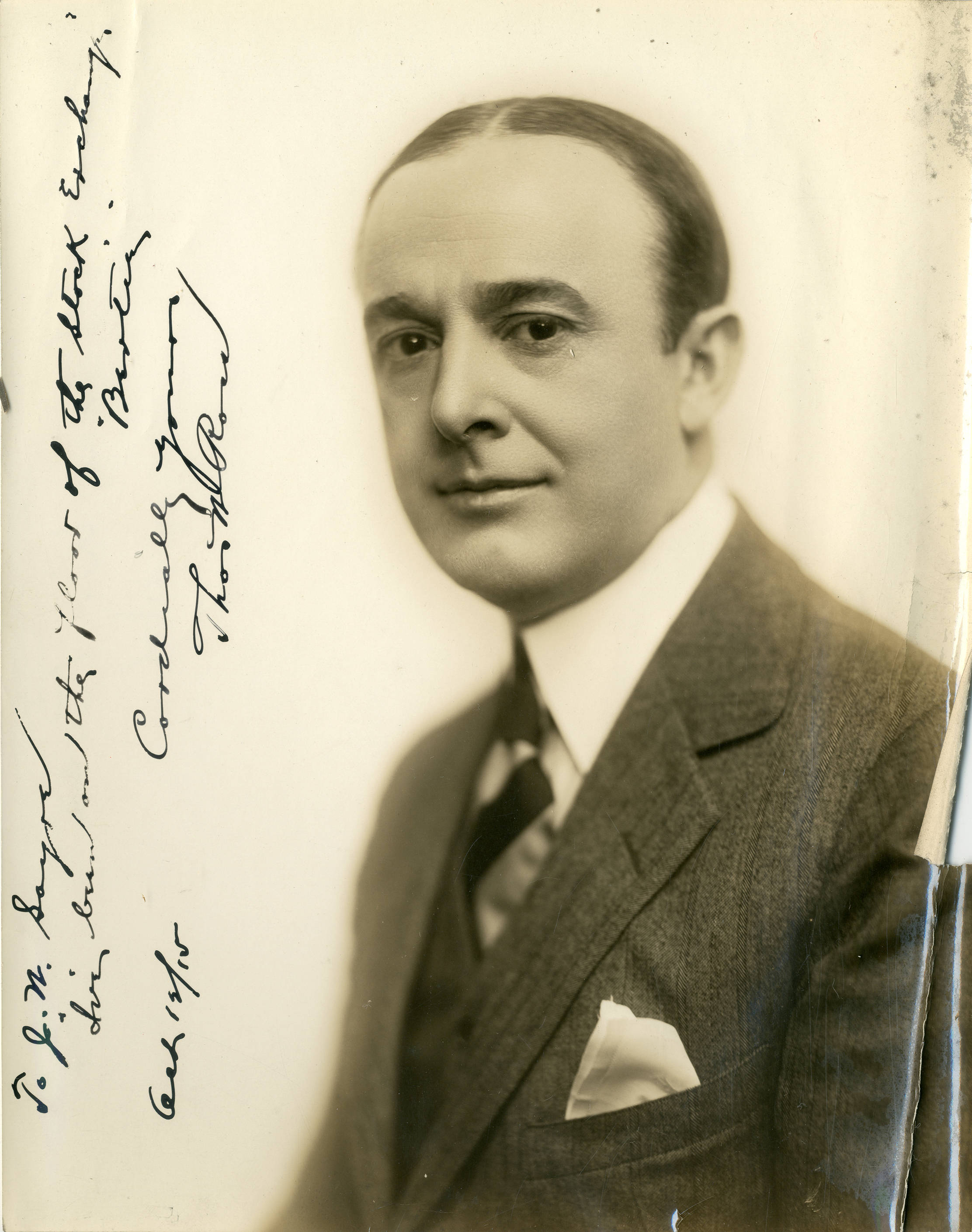

Thomas W. Ross (22 January 1875, Boston – 14 November 1959, Torrington, Connecticut) was an American stage and film actor.

Ross had a prolific career on Broadway from 1902 through 1944. He first drew critical acclaim for his portrayal of the title role in Henry Blossom's 1903 play Checkers. He first performed the role in the play's premiere at the National Theatre in Washington, D.C. on September 21, 1903, and continued with the work for both its Broadway runs in 1903 and 1904, and on national tour. Among his most relevant later stage roles was Mr. Webb in the original production of Thornton Wilder's Our Town in 1938.

In 1913 he reprised his role as Checkers in the silent film Checkers; his first film part. He occasionally returned to film acting during the next decades, but except for the lost 1920 film The Fatal Hour rarely in leading roles. He was mostly active as a film actor between 1939 and his final film 1942; however, at that time, the already elderly actor rarely received major roles and often went uncredited. Overall, he appeared in about two dozen films.

== Partial list of Broadway credits ==
- Lawrence Grattan's The Gossipy Sex (1927, as John Bowen)
- George White's Scandals (1928 & 1929 versions, as part of the Elm City Four)
- Harry Delf's The Family Upstairs (1933, as Joe Heller)
- Maxwell Anderson's High Tor (1937, as Judge Skimmerhorn)
- Thornton Wilder's Our Town (1938, as Mr. Webb); winner of the Pulitzer Prize for Drama
- Nunnally Johnson's The World's Full of Girls (1943, as Mr. Bridges)

== Filmography ==
- Checkers (1913)
- The Only Son (1914)
- The Fatal Hour (1920)
- Fine Feathers (1921)
- Without Limit (1921)
- Smoking Trails (1924)
- Wreckless (1935 short film)
- Blondie Takes a Vacation (1939)
- Remember the Night (1940)
- Seventeen (1940)
- The Mortal Storm (1940)
- The Man Who Talked Too Much (1940, uncredited)
- Phantom Raiders (1940)
- The Saint's Double Trouble (1940)
- Meet John Doe (1941, uncredited)
- Unfinished Business (1941, uncredited)
- Power Dive (1941)
- The Richest Man in Town (1941)
- Four Mothers (1941, uncredited)
- The Little Foxes (1941, uncredited)
- The Lady Has Plans (1942, uncredited)
- The Remarkable Andrew (1942)
- Dr. Broadway (1942)
- Take a Letter, Darling (1942, uncredited)
- Kings Row (1942, uncredited)
- Yankee Doodle Dandy (1942, uncredited)
