= Drafting =

Drafting or draughting may refer to:

- Campdrafting, an Australian equestrian sport
- Drafting (aerodynamics), slipstreaming
  - Drafting (cycling), when cyclists lie in a tight formation in the slipstream behind the lead cyclist
- Drafting (writing), writing something that is likely to be amended
- Technical drawing, the act and discipline of composing diagrams that communicates how something functions or is to be constructed. E.g.:
  - Architectural drawing
  - Electrical drawing
  - Engineering drawing
  - Plumbing drawing
  - Structural drawing
  - Textile manufacturing weaving pattern
- Conscription into compulsory military service
  - Draft (sports), where new players are chosen by the teams rather than the players choosing their teams
- Drafting, a hand spinning method of preparing fibers for spinning into yarn
- Drafting dog, a dog drawing a cart

== See also ==
- Draft (disambiguation)
