= A Full House (film) =

1920 film by James Cruze

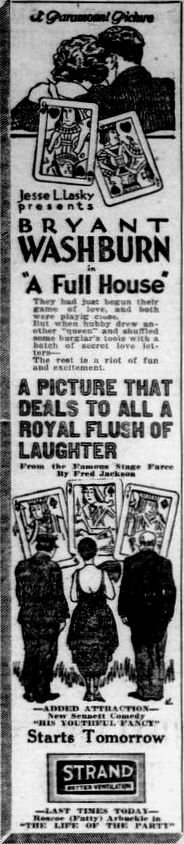
- Newspaper ad
- Directed by: James Cruze
- Screenplay by: Alice Eyton
- Based on: A Full House by Fred Jackson
- Produced by: Jesse L. Lasky
- Starring: Bryant Washburn; Lois Wilson
- Cinematography: H. Kinley Martin
- Production companies: Artcraft Pictures Corporation; Famous Players–Lasky Corporation
- Distributed by: Paramount Pictures
- Release date: October 24, 1920
- Running time: 50 minutes
- Country: United States
- Language: Silent (English intertitles)

A Full House is a 1920 American silent comedy film directed by James Cruze and written by Alice Eyton based upon the 1915 Broadway play of the same name by Frederick J. Jackson. The film stars Bryant Washburn, Lois Wilson, Guy Milham, Hazel Howell, Vera Lewis, and Beverly Travers. The film was released on October 24, 1920, by Paramount Pictures.

== Plot ==
As described in a film magazine, George Howell, a young lawyer, sadly separates himself from his bride Ottilie on the second day after their wedding to fulfill a commission from his friend Ned Pembroke to recover some incriminating love letters in the possession of a San Francisco showgirl. Ned will not propose to Daphne, Ottilie's sister, until the letters are safe in his hands. Allowing his wife to believe that he has gone to San Diego, George goes to San Francisco. On the return trip he accidentally exchanges his travelling bag with a crook who has stolen a wealthy woman's jewels. Once home, his wife discovers them among the burglary tools in his bag. Susie, a maid, sees them and calls the police, but later decides to try and earn the reward herself. The police surround the house, telling various people arriving at the scene that "you can go in but you can't come out." The thief returns to claim his loot and this gives rise to a continuation of skirmishes between the two men and the police, and in the end the real culprit is apprehended and the two couples find happiness.

== Cast ==
- Bryant Washburn as George Howell
- Lois Wilson as Ottilie Howell
- Guy Milham as Ned Pembroke
- Hazel Howell as Daphne
- Vera Lewis as Aunt Penelope
- Beverly Travers as Vera Vernon
- Lottie Williams as Susie
- J.P. Wild as Parks
- Z. Wall Covington as Mooney
- Frank Jonasson as King
- Lillian Leighton as Mrs. Fleming

== Preservation ==
In February 2021, A Full House was cited by the National Film Preservation Board on their Lost U.S. Silent Feature Films list and is therefore presumed lost.
