= Follow the Girl (musical) =

Musical by Parenteau and Blossom

Follow the Girl is a musical in three acts and 4 scenes with music by Zoel Parenteau and a book and lyrics by Henry Blossom.

== History ==
Follow the Girl was produced on Broadway by Raymond Hitchcock and E. Ray Goetz. The musical premiered at Lew Fields' 44th Street Roof Garden on March 2, 1918. During its Broadway run the show moved to the Broadhurst Theatre where it closed on March 23, 1918, after 25 performances. The musical starred Jobyna Howland as Mrs. Niles, Eileen Van Biene as Gladys Niles, William Danforth as T. Lyman Niles, Walter Catlett as Buck Sweeney, Harry Fender as Alfred Vanderveer, Mercedes Lorenze as Edwina Blake, Ralph Nairn as Rev. Jonas Tod, D.D., Richard Taber as Brophy, Ernestine Myers as Mademoiselle Rizpaz, George Bickel as William Tell, and Robert O'Connor as Guillereno Barbarento.

== Plot ==
Set at a hotel in Maine, the musical centers around the Niles family. The father, T. Lyman Niles, is failing in his business ventures on Wall Street. Distressed over the family's financial woes, Mrs. Niles is intent on finding a wealthy husband for her daughter, Gladys Niles. Gladys, however, is not interested in the men her mother is trying to entice her way and falls in love with the penniless Alfred Vanderveer.
