= Jaque Mate =

Jaque mate or Jaque Mate may refer to:

- "Jaque mate", Spanish for Checkmate in chess
- Jaque Mate (wrestler), born Jaime Álvarez Mendoza in 1948
- Jaque Mate (film), a 2011 Dominican drama

== See also ==
- Checkmate (disambiguation)
