= Zoel Parenteau =

American composer (1883–1972)

- Born: April 9, 1883; Northampton, Massachusetts, U.S.
- Died: September 13, 1972 (aged 89); Actors' Fund Home, Englewood, New Jersey, U.S.
- Occupations: Composer; arranger; music director
- Spouse: Emma Summersgill

Zoel Parenteau (April 9, 1883 – September 13, 1972) was an American composer, arranger, and music director. He is best remembered for his work as a Broadway composer.

== Biography ==
Born in Northampton, Massachusetts, Parenteau studied music composition with Ernest Bloch. A resident of Pittsburgh, he was the music director for the Nirella Orchestra; the name for a Pittsburgh band founded by its star clarinetist Danny Nirella who was also a composer of many popular marches. In 1915 his comic opera The Lady of Luzon premiered in Pittsburgh. He also composed the scores for the Broadway musicals The Amber Empress (1916, lyrics and book by Pulitzer Prize winner Marc Connelly) and Follow the Girl (1918, lyrics and book by Henry Blossom). His first work on Broadway was contributing music to the 1915 Charles Dillingham revue Hip! Hip! Hooray!. He also contributed the song "Someday I'll Find Your Words" and incidental music to David Belasco's 1928 play Kiki; a song which was briefly a popular standard. As an arranger, Parteneau worked for a variety of notable people, including Dillingham, Florence Ziegfeld, and Victor Herbert. He also worked as the longtime music director for Pittsburgh's KDKA (AM).

Parenteau died on September 13, 1972, at the Actors Fund Home in Englewood, New Jersey at the age of 89. He was married to Emma Parenteau (née Summersgill).
