= Draft (musician) =

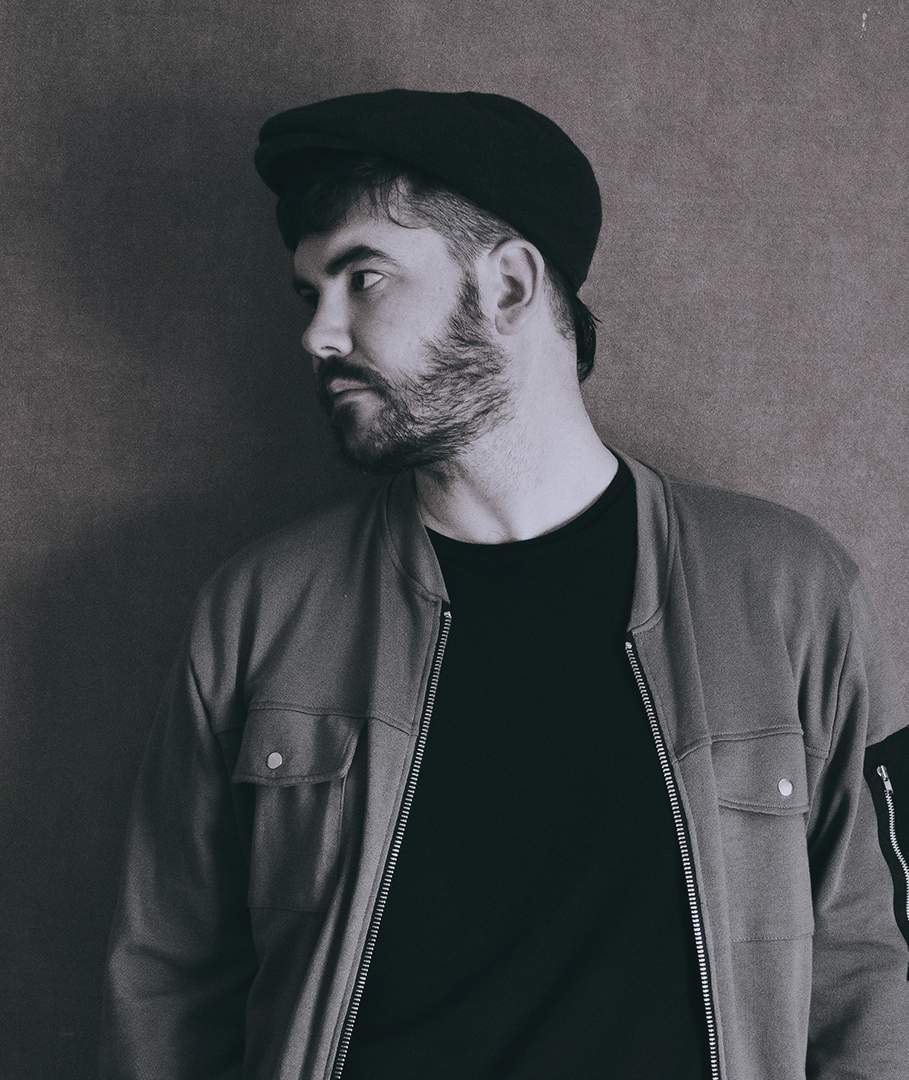
- Liam Tallon in 2018

Background information
- Born: Liam Tallon; 8 November 1986 (age 40)
- Origin: Leytonstone, United Kingdom
- Genres: Electronica; Electro house Avant-garde
- Years active: 2009–present
- Labels: Mau5trap; Pilot
- Website: draft.uk.com

Liam Tallon (born 8 November 1986), also known by his stage name Draft, is a British electronic music producer, DJ and songwriter.

== Biography ==
On 9 May 2012, Liam Tallon was invited to perform on Goldie's Metalheadz Podcast.

In 2015, Tallon signed his first release with mau5trap via the We Are Friends, Vol. 4 compilation, as well as curating the promotional mix for the commercial release. In 2016, he released his first full EP on mau5trap, titled Left Behind, before again featuring on mau5trap's artist compilation We Are Friends, Vol. 5, where he once again curated the promotional mix. In October 2016 he released From Inside, again on mau5trap, with the track Bishop Takes King being featured in the online documentary Legends Rising, from League of Legends. In November 2016, he was awarded the status of Power User by Image-Line for his use of their flagship software, FL Studio.

His musical influences range from Heavy Metal to Classical music. Appearing on the landmark 10th episode of the Limitless Vibrations Podcast, Tallon slated 2019 as the year he would release his debut LP, in addition to a downtempo EP, which would be a return to his original production style.

== Discography ==
=== Extended plays ===
Year	Title	Catalogue number
2014	Phryday	PILOT012
2014	Makeshift Constellations	PILOT017
2014	Pillage	PILOT018
2016	Left Behind	MAU5FREE
2016	From Inside	MAU50107
2017	Patience & Time	MAU50131
2018	In Dreams	DRFT001
2018	More Than Her	DRFT002
2019	Grimy Scraps	DRFT003
2019	Saviour	DRFT004
