= Checkers: A Hard Luck Story =

1896 novel by Henry Blossom

Checkers: A Hard-Luck Story is a novel by Henry Blossom. First published in 1896, the novel is set during the World's Columbian Exposition and follows businessman Jack Preston as he develops a friendship with the horse racing tout and gambler Edward "Checkers" Campbell. Much of the action of the novel takes place at the American Derby in Arlington Park just outside of Chicago, and at a variety of bars and gambling establishments in Chicago. The novel was the basis for the 1924 silent film Gold Heels.

Blossom adapted his novel into a play, Checkers, which premiered at the American Theatre on Broadway in 1903. The play adaptation was the basis for two silent films entitled Checkers; one made in 1913, and the other made in 1919. The play was also adapted into a Broadway musical, Honey Girl (1920), by Edward Clark, Albert Von Tilzer, and Neville Fleeson.
