= The Slim Princess (1920 film) =

1920 film by Victor Schertzinger

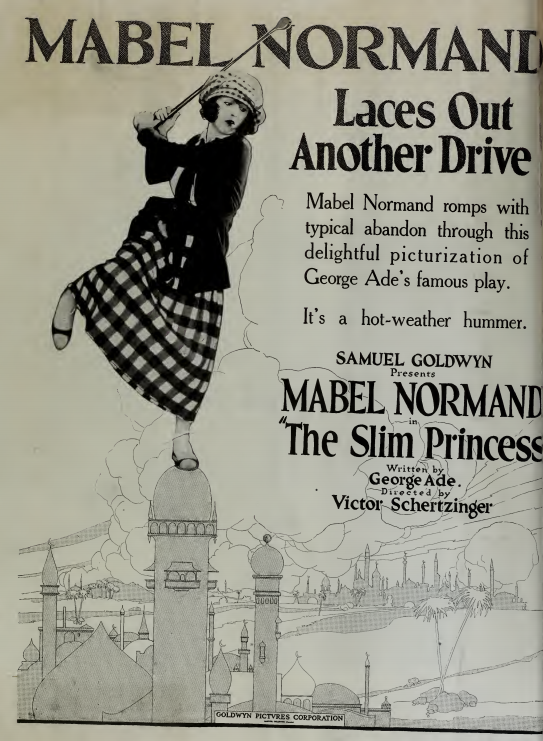
- 1920 theatrical poster
- Directed by: Victor Schertzinger
- Written by: George Ade (story); Gerald Duffy (screenplay)
- Based on: The Slim Princess by Henry Blossom and Leslie Stuart
- Produced by: Samuel Goldwyn
- Starring: Mabel Normand; Tully Marshall
- Cinematography: George Webber
- Distributed by: Goldwyn Pictures Corporation
- Release date: July 1920
- Running time: 5 reels
- Country: United States
- Language: Silent (English intertitles)

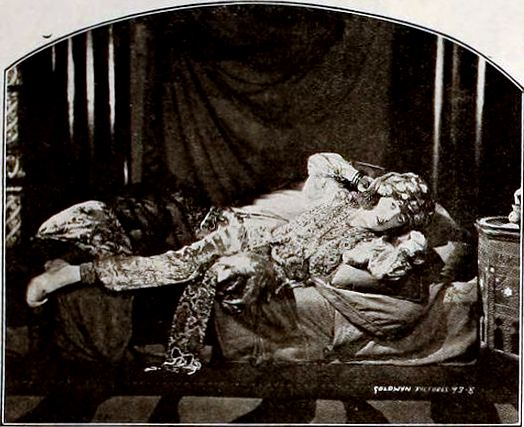
Mabel Normand as Princess Kalora

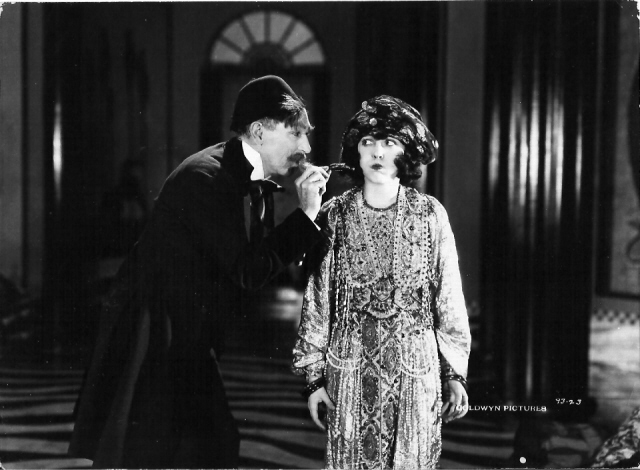
Tully Marshall and Mabel Normand

The Slim Princess is a 1920 American silent comedy-drama film starring Mabel Normand, directed by Victor Schertzinger, produced by Samuel Goldwyn, and written by Gerald C. Duffy based on a musical play of the same name by Henry Blossom and Leslie Stuart, which was from a story by George Ade. The picture is a Goldwyn Pictures Corporation production with a supporting cast featuring Hugh Thompson, Tully Marshall, Russ Powell, Lillian Sylvester, and Harry Lorraine.

The cinematographer was George Webber and future director Henry Hathaway was a 22-year-old prop boy on the set.

== Plot ==
As described in a film magazine, Princess Kalora of Morovenia, a fictional country where obese women are prized and the normal-sized princess is widely regarded as being too slender, finds no suitors in the matrimonial market. Her younger sister, weighing in the neighborhood of 300 pounds and who is also the family favorite, is sought by the eligible men of the court. American millionaire Alexander Pike sees the princess and immediately falls in love with her, and is then hounded from the country by the police of her father. The princess is later sent to America to partake of a patent fat producer that is widely advertised, and meets Alexander at the Ambassador's ball. Their romance is interrupted when a cable calls the princess and her bodyguard back to Morovenia. Arriving at home thinner than when she left, Kalora is thrown into a dungeon. When Alexander, whose millions are no less powerful in Morovenia than in America, arrives, he convinces her father of his love for Kalora, marries the princess, thus opening the way to the altar for the second daughter, and all are happy.

== Cast ==
- Mabel Normand as Princess Kalora
- Hugh Thompson as Alexander Pike
- Tully Marshall as Papova
- Russ Powell as Governor General
- Lillian Sylvester as Jeneka
- Harry Lorraine as Detective
- Pomeroy Cannon as Counsellor

== Original version ==
The film is a remake of a 1915 movie featuring Francis X. Bushman, Ruth Stonehouse, and Wallace Beery.

== Preservation ==
It is not known whether the film currently survives, which suggests that it is a lost film.
