= Final Draft =

Final Draft may refer to:

- Final Draft (software), screenwriting software for writing and formatting a screenplay
- Final Draft (novel), a 2007 novel by Russian writer Sergey Lukyanenko
- Final Draft (film), a 2007 horror film starring James Van Der Beek
