= The Velvet Lady =

1919 musical comedy by Victor Herbert and Henry Blossom

The Velvet Lady is a "musical comedy in three acts" with music by Victor Herbert and a book and lyrics by Henry Blossom. Blossom's book is an adaptation of Fred Jackson's 1915 play A Full House. It was the final collaboration between Herbert and Blossom; premiering on Broadway just a month before Blossom's death. The musical opened at Broadway's New Amsterdam Theatre on February 3, 1919. It closed at that theatre in June 1919 after 136 performances. The production starred Fay Marbe as Vera Venon, a.k.a. "The Velvet Lady", Ernest Torrence as Parks, Marie Flynn as Ottilie Howell, Ray Raymond as George Howell, Georgia O'Ramey as Susie, Minerva Coverdale as Bubbles, Alfred Gerrard as Ned Pembroke, and Jed Prouty as Nicholas King.
