= Cross check =

Cross check may refer to:

- CrossCheck (project), a coalition set up to support truth and verification in media
- Cross-checking, an infraction in the sport of ice hockey and lacrosse
- Cross-check (chess), a chess tactic of blocking a check with a check to force the exchange of pieces
- Crosscheck (board game), published by TSR in 1985
- The Interstate Voter Registration Crosscheck Program, a former voter registration list maintenance program in the United States
- Crossed cheque, a cheque (monetary instrument) that has been marked to specify an instruction about the way it is to be redeemed
