= Justice Drew =

Justice Drew may refer to:

- E. Harris Drew (1903–1978), associate justice of the Florida Supreme Court
- James B. Drew (1877–1953), chief justice of the Supreme Court of Pennsylvania
