= Eileen (opera) =

Musical by Victor Herbert and Henry Blossom

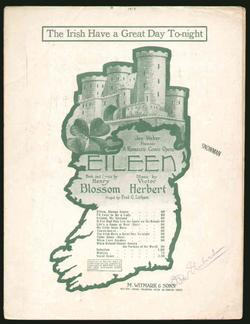
- Sheet music cover
- Music: Victor Herbert
- Lyrics: Henry Blossom
- Book: Henry Blossom
- Basis: Rory O'More by Samuel Lover
- Productions: 1917 Broadway

Eileen is a comic opera in three acts (Note: While the work is labeled an opera in its published score, it has been variously described as an opera, an operetta and a musical.) with music by Victor Herbert and lyrics and book by Henry Blossom, based loosely on the 1835 novel Rory O'More by Herbert's grandfather, Samuel Lover. Set in 1798, the story concerns an Irish revolutionary arrested by the British for treason. Eileen, his nobly born sweetheart, helps him to escape by disguising him as a servant.

After two Cleveland performances at the Colonial Theatre on January 1–2, 1917 titled Hearts of Erin, the operetta moved on to Boston, changing its name to Eileen. It then opened at the Shubert Theatre on March 19, 1917 and ran for 64 performances. It was produced by Joe Weber, formerly of the comedy duo Weber and Fields. It then toured, but a fire destroyed its sets and costumes three months into the tour. The show was not revived in New York until the end of the 20th century. In 1982, a single on-book concert performance was given at Manhattan's Town Hall, featuring E. G. Marshall as O'Day, Judy Kaye as Lady Maude and Roderick Cook as Sir Reginald. In 1997, it was produced and recorded by the Ohio Light Opera. In 2012, a small-scale production was given by the Light Opera of New York.

Herbert was eager to write an "Irish" musical to celebrate the land of his ancestors. His score was well received by the critics, but the libretto received some harsh reviews. Alexander Woollcott wrote: "Mr Blossom [must have] gathered his material and atmosphere by reading for quite half an hour in some public library."

== Roles and original cast ==
- Eileen Mulvaney, niece of Lady Maude (soprano) – Grace Breen
- Captain Barry O'Day, a fine Irish Rebel (tenor) – Walter Scanlan
- Lady Maude Estabrooke, Eileen's Aunt – Olga Roller
- Colonel Lester, the local British authority – Edward Martindel
- Shaun Dhu, Barry's steadfast mate – Greek Evans
- Sir Reginald Stribling, a British Knight – Algernon Grieg
- Rosie Flynn – Louise Allen
- Biddy Flynn – F. Josie Claflin
- "Humpy" Grogan, the British tax collector – John B. Cooke
- Lanty Hackett – Harry Crosby
- Mickey O'Brien – Joseph Dillon
- Dinny Doyle – Scott Welsh
- Chorus of Villagers

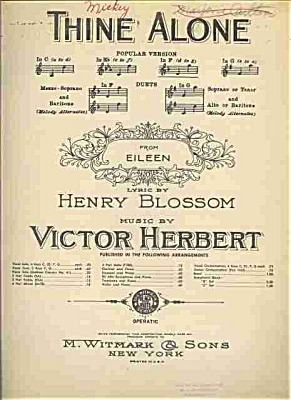

== Synopsis ==
Act I

It is 1798, the year of the brutal uprisings of the United Irishmen, who seek to reclaim their lands from the British. Lady Maude, the attractive widow of Lord Estabrook, an English lady, is the mistress of Castle Sligo, once held by the O'Day family, creating resentment among the Irish locals. Her niece, Eileen, has returned to Ireland after schooling at a convent in France; she is accompanied by the bumbling Sir Reginald. Shaun Dhu leads a band of smugglers and revolutionaries on the Western coast of Ireland that includes Barry O'Day, son of a legendary Irish rebel. The band stores its loot at Biddy's Black Bull Inn in an effort to avoid nasty British tax collector Humpy Grogan. Lady Maude and Eileen stop at the Inn when their carriage breaks down. Barry protects them from some village drunks and flirts with Maude, although it is really Eileen who has caught his eye; Maude is sympathetic to the rebels' cause. Colonel Lester, the local British authority, comes to arrest Barry for treason, but Lady Maude keeps the Colonel at bay, and Barry escapes disguised as Lady Maude's groom.

Act II

Later, at Castle Sligo, Lady Maude has developed affection for Barry. Eileen explains that Barry is a rogue. Nevertheless, Maude decides to help Barry escape again from the Colonel by putting a coachman's uniform on her guest, Sir Reggie, making him a decoy. Sir Reggie is arrested and sentenced to death before the Colonel learns that he has been fooled and that Barry has gotten away again.

Act III

By the time of Lady Maude's birthday, Eileen and Barry have fallen in love. Learning that Barry is there, the Colonel has his men surround the castle. Barry surrenders, and he is about to be shot, when news arrives that the King has pardoned the rebels. The arrest is reversed, various couples are united, including Barry and Eileen, and it is declared that "Ireland shall stand among all nations of the world."

== Recordings ==
The show's hit song, "Thine Alone", has been frequently recorded. Al Goodman's orchestra and soloists recorded eight highlights from Eileen on a set of 78 RPM records. These selections were later reissued by RCA Camden on one side of a 12-inch LP (selections from Polonaise are on the reverse). This album has been out-of-print since the late 1950s. The Ohio Light Opera revived and recorded the musical in 1997, adapted by Quade Winter from Herbert's manuscripts, held in the collection of the Library of Congress (Newport Classics NPD 85615/2, double CD, 1998).

In 2011, a recording starred Mary O'Sullivan in the title role and an "Orchestra of Ireland" (composed of members of the two RTÉ orchestras) conducted by David Brophy "in a genuinely vital, colorful reading of this luscious score." (New World Records 80733-2, double CD, 2012).

== Songs ==
Act I

- Free Trade and a Misty Moon – Shaun Dhu and Smuggler Chorus
- My Little Irish Rose – Rosie Flynn
- Ireland, My Sireland – Captain Barry O'Day
- Finale Act I (Glad, Triumphant Hour) – Entire Company

Act II

- Opening Act II (Round) – Female Chorus
- Too-re-loo-re – Eileen and Chorus
- Eileen, Alanna Asthore – Barry O'Day
- If Eve Had Left the Apple on the Bough – Sir "Reggie"
- I'd Love to be a Lady – Dinny Doyle and Rosie
- When Love Awakes! – Eileen and Girls
- Life's a Game at Best – Lady Maude and Colonel Lester
- Finale – Ensemble

Act III

- Opening Act III (In Erin's Isle) – Dinny, Lady Maude and Ensemble
- Thine Alone – Eileen and Barry O'Day
- The Irish Have a Great Day Tonight – Dinny and Men
- When Ireland Stands Among the Nations of the World – Barry O'Day and Ensemble
