= Our Wives (play) =

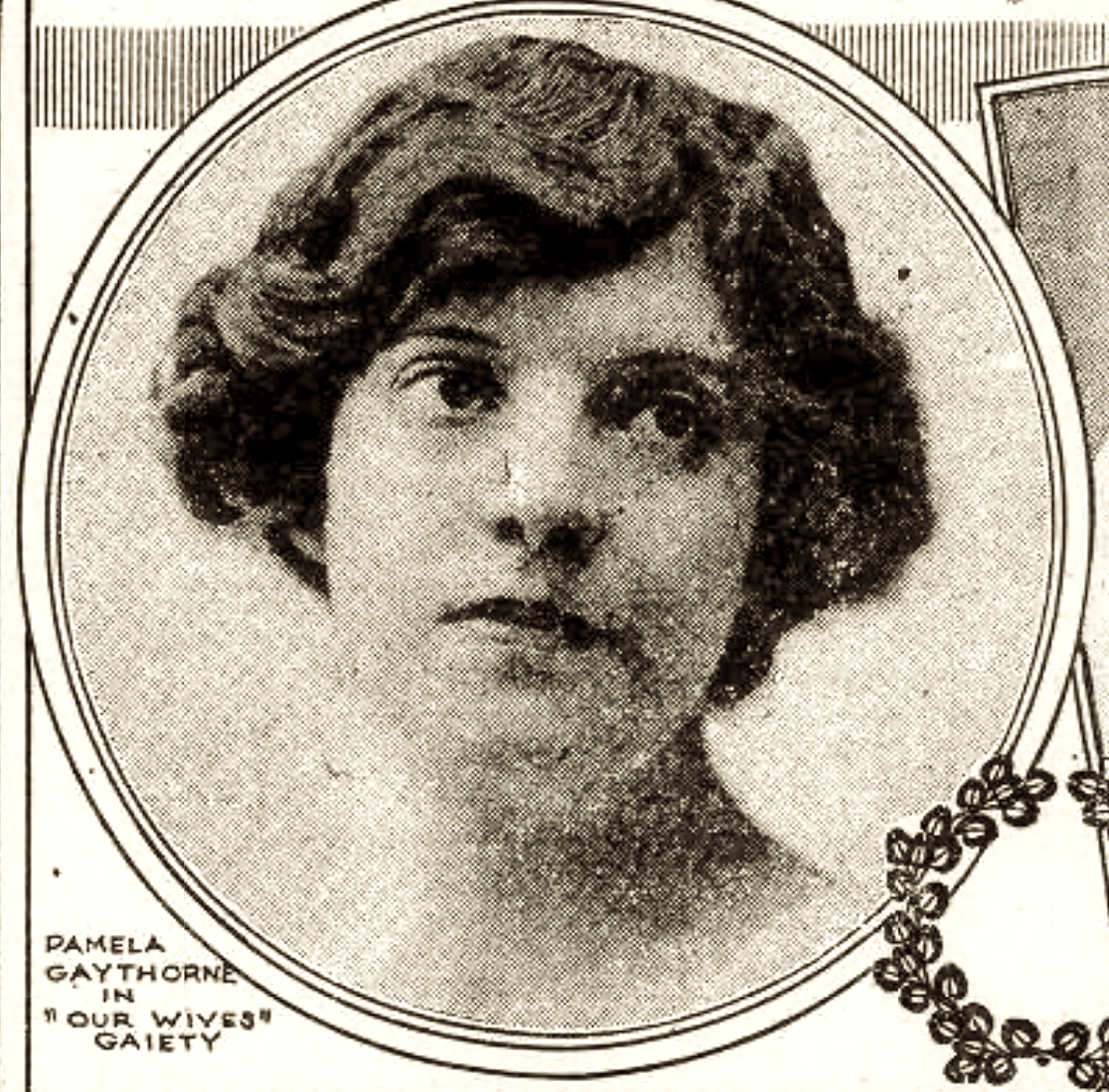
Pamela Gaythorne as Wilson in Our Wives.

Our Wives is a play in three acts by Helen Kraft and Frank Mandel. A farce, Kraft and Mandel based their play on Ludwig Fulda's German-language comedy Jugendfreunde (1897).

== Plot ==
Frank Bowers is content to remain a bachelor, and is dismayed when his three closest friends (Harry, Sylvan, and Melville) all get engaged, and then married; leaving their bachelor days behind them. A librettist, Bowers hears a piece of music by the composer Wilson that he admires, and decides to find Wilson in order that they might collaborate on a project together. Bowers is surprised that Wilson is a woman and not a man when they finally meet. They are both attracted to one another, but agree to put their attraction aside in order to work professionally together. All does not go according to plan, and a comedy of errors ensues as the professional and personal become entangled and they find their feeling for one another cannot be so easily put aside.

== History ==
Our Wives premiered in July 1912 at Parson's Theatre in Hartford, Connecticut. It toured to the National Theatre in Washington, D.C. the following October. The production then went to New York where it opened on Broadway at Wallack's Theatre on November 4, 1912. It closed the following month after a total of 40 performances at that theatre. The cast included Henry Kolker as Frank Bowers, Pamela Gaythorne as Wilson, Mark Smith as Harry Lyon, Isabel MacGregor as Margaret Lyon, Vera Finlay as Emily Martin, William Rosell as Sylvan Martin, George Graham as Melville Tatum, Gwendolyn Piers as Elizabeth Tatum, and John Findlay as Otto.

Our Wives was adapted by composer Victor Herbert and librettist Henry Blossom into the 1914 Broadway musical The Only Girl.

== Reception ==
The Washington Evening Star compared the work to William Shakespeare's Much Ado About Nothing stating that Henry Kolker as Frank Bowers was a "Benedick modernized", and that the character of Wilson possessed the "woman's wit" of Beatrice.
