= Eustace Hale Ball =

American screenwriter

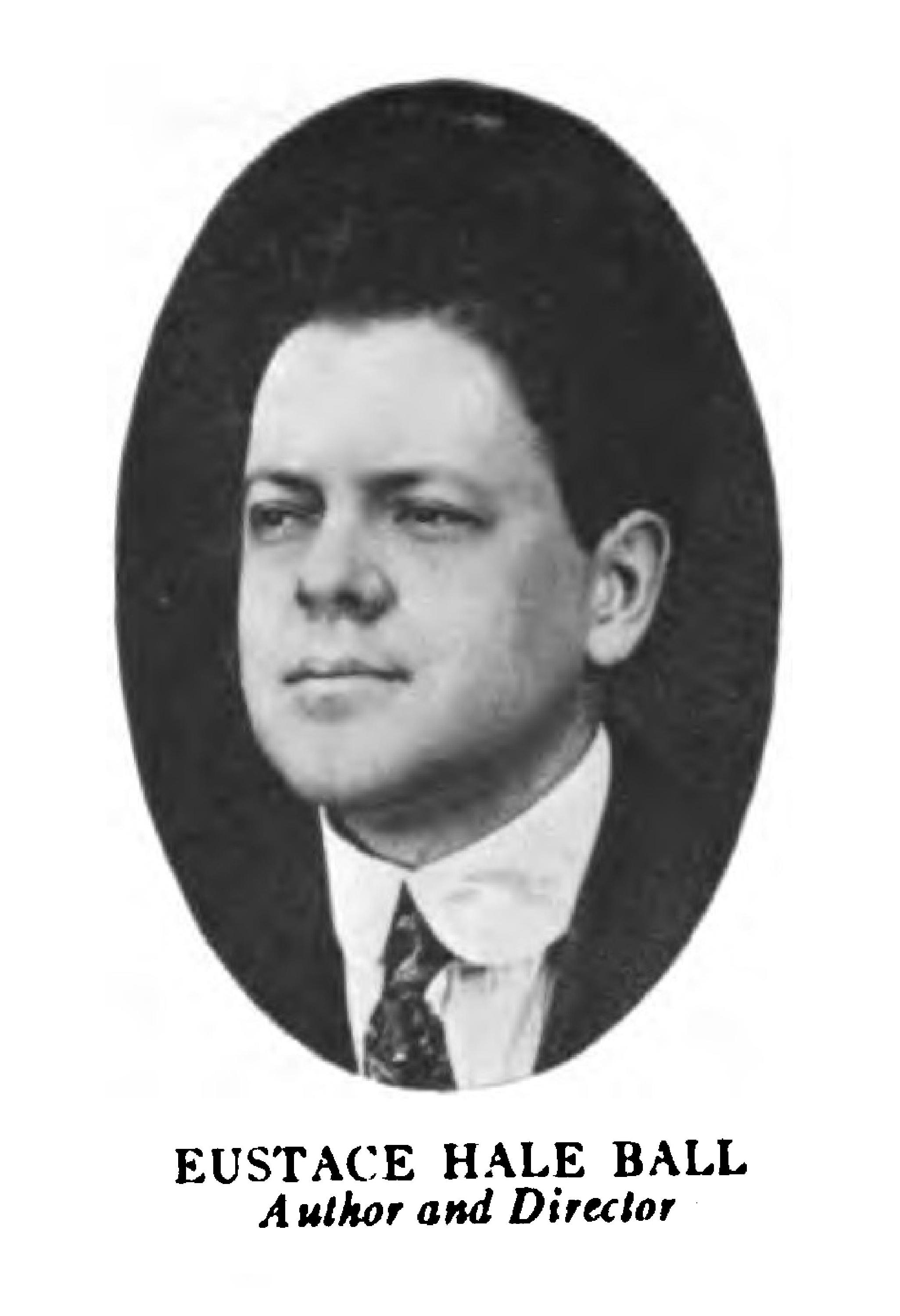

Eustace Hale Ball (1881 – 1931) was a writer, screenwriter, and director of short films in the United States. He wrote The Voice on the Wire, Bubbles from Gotham's Pierian Spring, Traffic In Souls: A Novel Of Crime And Its Cure, and The Gaucho.

An interview with him was published in a 1917 edition of The Editor.

== Books ==
- A Handbook for Scenario Writer's (1913)
- The Art of the Photoplay (1913)
- Traffic in Souls: A Novel of Crime and Its Cure (1914)
- Photoplay Scenarios: How to Write and Sell Them (1915)
- The Voice on the Wire (1915)
- Mollie: A Novel (1926)
- The Scarlet Fox Grosset and Dunlap, New York (1927)
- The Gaucho, Grosset and Dunlap, New York (1928), a novelization of the screen play
- The Legion of the Condemned, novelization (1928)

== Filmography ==
- Robin Hood (1912 film), scenario
- Checkers (1913 film), scenario with Larence McGill
- The Voice on the Wire (1917)
- Beyond the Rainbow (1922), adaptation
