= Drawdown =

Drawdown may refer to:

- Drawdown (book), 2017 book by Paul Hawken about climate change mitigation
- Drawdown (climate), the point at which greenhouse gas concentrations in the atmosphere begin to decline
- Drawdown (economics), decline in the value of an investment, below its all-time high
- Drawdown (hydrology), a lowering of a reservoir or a change in hydraulic head in an aquifer, typically due to pumping a well
- Drawdown card, used for testing paints and coatings through wet film preparation
- Drawdown chart, paper used to test various coating properties
- Income drawdown, a method withdrawing benefits from a UK Registered Pension Scheme
- Drawdown, a financial term also known as a capital call

== See also ==
- Capital call, finance term, also known as a draw down
- Reduction (disambiguation)
