= Drew High School =

Drew High School is the name of multiple secondary schools in the United States, among them:

- Drew Central High School, Monticello, Arkansas
- Drew School, San Francisco, California
- Charles Drew High School, Riverdale, Georgia
- Drew Charter School, Atlanta, Georgia
- Drew High School (Mississippi), former school in Drew, Mississippi
