= The Slim Princess (1915 film) =

1915 film by Elisha Helm Calvert

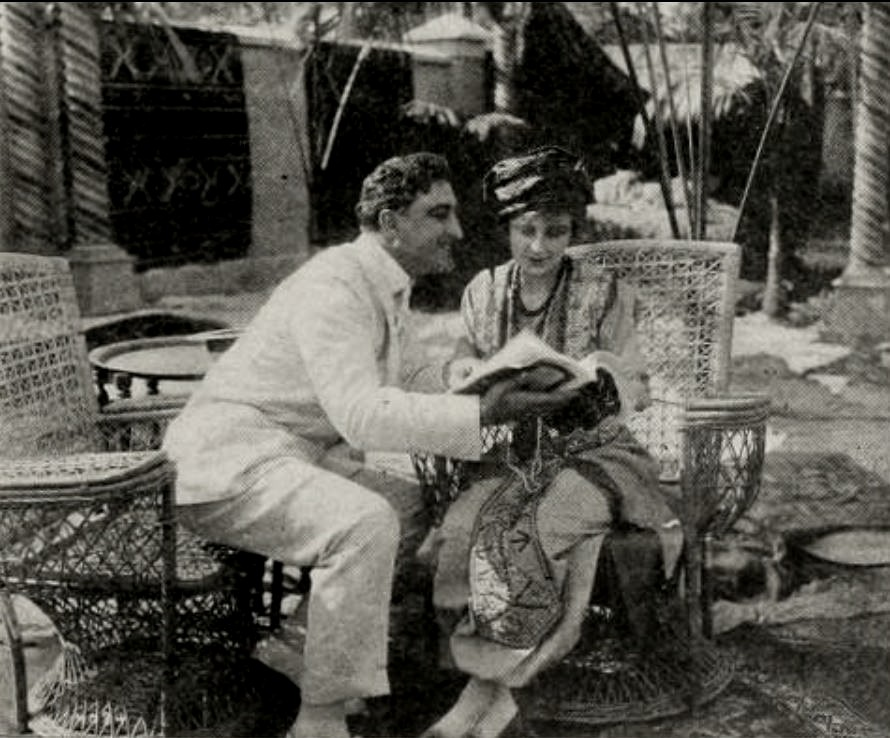
- Still with the princess looking over the American magazine
- Directed by: E. H. Calvert
- Based on: The Slim Princess by Henry Blossom
- Starring: Francis X. Bushman; Ruth Stonehouse; Wallace Beery
- Cinematography: Jackson Rose
- Production company: Essanay Film Manufacturing Company
- Distributed by: V-L-S-E
- Release date: May 24, 1915
- Running time: 4 reels
- Country: United States
- Language: Silent (English intertitles)

The Slim Princess is a 1915 American silent comedy film directed by E. H. Calvert and starring Francis X. Bushman, Ruth Stonehouse and Wallace Beery. (This is believed to have been Beery's first full-length feature film.) The movie was written by Edward T. Lowe, Jr. from a story by George Ade and play by Henry Blossom, and was subsequently remade into a 1920 film starring Mabel Normand. The farcical plot involves a princess of a fictional country, loosely based upon Turkey, in which obese women are prized and the normal-sized protagonist is widely regarded as being too slender.

== Plot ==
As described in a film magazine, Alexander Pike, longing for new fields to conquer and willing to give a federal grand jury some time to forget him, takes a trip to Morovenia, where the ruling governor is desperate because Kalora, his oldest daughter, refuses to get fat enough to conform to the Turkish ideal of beauty and so be safely married off. The law forbids her younger and fatter sister to marry first. Popova, the princess's tutor, has a secret grudge against the governor and encourages the Slim Princess privately to devour pickles and so preserve her slim outlines. Pike drops in for an informal call on the Slim Princess one afternoon by way of the back wall of the garden. The Princess is delighted to find that slimness is an added charm in America. He proves it to her by a magazine. He is discovered by the guards and, after a short fight, flees. The Slim Princess is sent to America to be fed on breakfast food guaranteed to put fat on any bones. She enjoys America so much and, after a renewal of her acquaintance with Alexander Pike, she becomes still slimmer, essaying to conform to the lines of the American girls. Her father discovers this through the reports of the Turkish legation, and she and Popova are recalled in disgrace and the tutor sent to prison. Pike follows them back to Morovenia and asks the governor for the hand of his daughter in marriage. Then comes swift action, in which the fat and slim princesses become considerably mixed during the negotiations between the American and the governor, who cannot understand why any man could want a thin wife. The Slim Princess and her lover are finally sorted out, and Popova released from prison.

== Cast ==
- Francis X. Bushman as Alexander H. Pike
- Ruth Stonehouse as Princess Kalora
- Wallace Beery as Popova
- Harry Dunkinson as Count Selim Malagaski
- Terza Bey as Princess Jeneka
- Bryant Washburn as Rawley Plumston
- Lester Cuneo as The Only Koldo

== Preservation ==
With no prints of The Slim Princess located in any film archives, it is a lost film.
