= Quickdraw (disambiguation) =

A quickdraw is a piece of climbing equipment used to connect rope to bolt anchors.

Quickdraw or Quick Draw may also refer to:

- Fast draw, a term in gunfighting
- QuickDraw, a graphics software library by Apple
- Quick, Draw!, an online game by Google based around a neural network guessing what a drawing represents.
- Quick-Draw!, a 1982 computer game
- Quick Draw McGraw, a Hanna-Barbera cartoon character
- Quick Draw (TV series), a television show presented by Hulu
- The brand name for Keno games operated by the New York State Lottery
