= Operation Checkmate =

Operation Checkmate could refer to:

- Operation Checkmate (commando raid) a Second World War British Commando raid
- Operation Checkmate (Sri Lanka) a Sri Lankan anti-insurgency operation
