= The Only Girl (musical) =

The Only Girl is a "musical farce in three acts" with music by Victor Herbert and a book and lyrics by Henry Blossom. The musical is based on the 1912 play Our Wives by Frank Mandel and Helen Kraft. It opened on Broadway at the 39th Street Theatre on November 2, 1914. During its Broadway run it transferred to the Lyric Theatre where it closed on June 5, 1915, after 240 performances. The Broadway production starred Wilda Bennett as the composer Ruth Wilson; Thurston Hall as her librettist Alan Kimbrough; Adele Rowland as the soubrette Patricia La Montrose, a.k.a. "Patsy"; Ernest Torrence as the painter Andrew McMurray, a.k.a. "Bunkie"; Vivian Wessell as Bunkie's wife; and Jed Prouty as the lawyer Fresh; Josephine Whittell as Margaret Ayer, Fresh's wife.

The London production opened at the Apollo Theatre in the West End on September 25, 1915, and ran for 107 performances.

It was revived on Broadway in 1934 with Louise Kirtland as Jane McMurray.
