= Draft lottery =

Draft lottery can refer to:

- A draft lottery conducted to determine the order for the first selections in a sports draft
  - NBA draft lottery, used in the National Basketball Association draft
  - NHL Draft Lottery, used in the National Hockey League Entry Draft
  - PBA draft lottery, used in the Philippine Basketball Association draft
  - WWE draft lottery, used in the WWE draft
- Draft lottery (1969), the system whereby the United States conscripted soldiers during the Vietnam War
