= Checkers (1919 film) =

1919 silent film directed by Richard Stanton

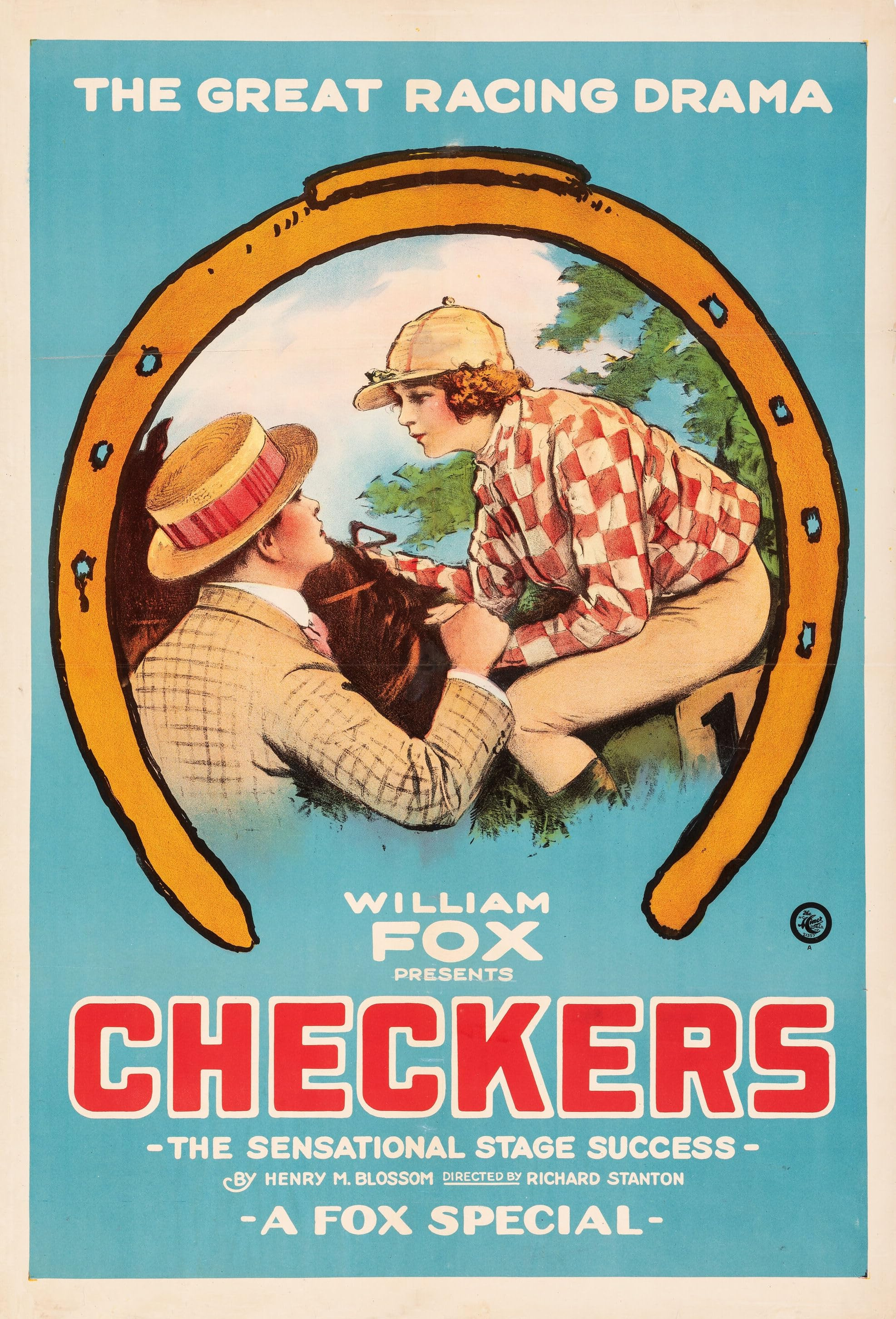
- Film poster
- Directed by: Richard Stanton
- Written by: Adrian Johnson
- Based on: The screenplay 'Checkers' by Henry Blossom
- Produced by: William Fox
- Production company: Fox Film Corp.
- Release date: August 24, 1919
- Running time: 7 reels
- Country: United States
- Language: English

Checkers is a 1919 American silent melodrama film, directed by Richard Stanton. There are no known archival holdings of the film, so it is presumably a lost film. The film is based on the screenplay with the same name by Henry Blossom. Mazie LaShelle Hunt and Marjorie Seely Blossom, the widows of Kirke La Shelle and Henry Blossom respectively, filed a lawsuit in the Supreme Court against Fox Film regarding the sale of the film.

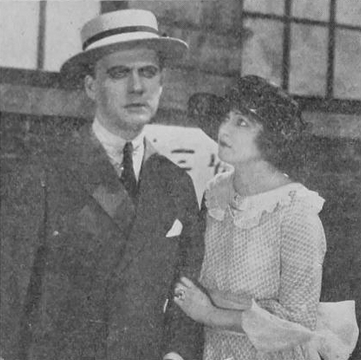
A scene from the film.

== Cast list ==
- Thomas Carrigan as Checkers
- Jean Acker as Pert Barlow
- Ellen Cassidy as Alva Romaine
- Robert Elliott as Arthur Kendall
- Tammany Young as Push Miller
- Bertram Marburgh as Judge Barlow
- Edward Sedgwick as Pete
- Peggy Worth as Sadie Martin
- Frank Beamish as Colonel Warren
- Freeman Barnes as Sam Wah
- Gene Bucus as Chinese girl
- Juliet Crane as A girl of the slums
- Anna Neilson as Hag
- Dorothy Orth as Ballet dancer
- Bret Black as boy

== Reception ==
The Film Daily gave it a positive review in July 1920, stating that it as a whole was a "Good, old-fashioned racing meller that contained thrills a-plenty, heart interest, and all the other elements that should make it go ver big; well-acted and well-produced.". Photoplay also gave it a positive review, writing that it "[...] has a speed that never lets down, an electric sort of thrill in its most exciting episodes, and its heroics are of the style that recall those days when we shuffled our feet among the peanut-shells on the gallery floor and nearly fell over the rail whenever the heroine was in peril."

By October 1919, the film had been seen by over 1,540,000 people, and had been shown 700 times in New York alone.
