= Alfred G. Robyn =

Alfred George Robyn
- Born: April 29, 1860; Saint Louis, Missouri, US
- Died: October 18, 1935 (aged 75); New York City, US
- Occupations: Composer, performer, music educator
- Known for: All for the Ladies

Alfred George Robyn (April 29, 1860 – October 18, 1935) was an American composer, organist, conductor, and music educator. While his compositional output consisted of a wide range of music, he is best remembered as a composer of light operas and Broadway musicals. He composed the Broadway musicals Princess Beggar (1907), The Yankee Tourist (1907), All for the Ladies (1912), and Pretty Mrs. Smith (1914); many in collaboration with lyricist and playwright Henry Blossom. His compositional output also consisted of fourteen operas, two oratorios, Symphony in D minor, the symphonic poem Pompeii, a piano concerto, a piano quintet, numerous works for solo piano, and over two hundred songs. His best known work is the comic opera The Yankee Consul (premiered 1903 in Boston; Broadway production in 1904).

== Life and career as a performer, conductor, and music educator ==
Born in Saint Louis on April 29, 1860, Alfred G. Robyn was the son of German composer, organist, and conductor William Robyn (1814–1905). Alfred was trained as a musician by his father. William Robyn was an important musical figure in the city of Saint Louis, notably founding the first orchestra in that city, the St. Louis Polyhymnia Society in 1845. William also founded the music department at Saint Louis University in 1838 and both the St. Louis Brass Band and St. Louis German Vocal Association in 1839. William's brother (Afred's uncle), was the cellist, composer, and music educator Henry Robyn.

Alfred was a child prodigy and began his career as a musician early, with his first public performance being in a piano trio at the age of nine. He began assisting his father in his work as a church organist at the age of 10, and at the age of 11 he was hired as the organist at the Church of St. John in Saint Louis. He was also active as a concert pianist, both as a soloist and chamber musician, from this point forward. In 1877, at the age of 17, he toured the United States as accompanist for Emma Abbott and her troupe of performers.

After returning to Saint Louis, Robyn became music director of the Olympic Theatre in that city where he notably conducted the world premiere of Wayman C. McCreery's opera L'Afrique on 16 May 1881. In 1883 he began a career as music educator for St. Louis Public Schools; remaining with the school district for the next 25 years while continuing to compose music and work as a pianist, organist, and music director in a variety of ways. In the 1890s he performed as a member of the Beethoven Trio Club, and in 1894 he became conductor of the orchestra of the Apollo Club in Saint Louis; a role he continued to hold through the first decade of the 20th century. In the first years of the 20th century he organized a concert series of instrumental music at the Odeon Theatre in Saint Louis. This series included multiple organ recitals featuring Robyn in 1900-1901.

In 1909 Alfred G. Robyn was awarded an honorary doctorate from Saint Louis University in recognition of his contributions to the musical life of Saint Louis. He moved to New York City a few years later where he worked as an organist accompanying silent films at the Rialto Theatre; a position he began in June 1915. He remained at that theatre until 1924 when he was poached by the Roxy Theatre. He continued to work as an organist in New York City until his death on October 18, 1935, at Saint Luke's Hospital in New York City at the age of 75. The cause was peritonitis.

== Composer ==
Alfred G. Robyn's first composition of note was the song "A Lady's 'No' Means 'Yes' " (lyrics George Cooper) which he wrote for the Emma Abbot troupe's lead tenor, Will H. Stanley, while touring with that organization in 1878. He conducted the premiere of his first opera, Manette, at the Pickwick Theatre in Saint Louis in 1883; a work which was later given a far grander production at the Standard Theatre in Saint Louis in 1885 where it was positively received. However, subsequent performances of this opera on tour to other cities were not as successful.

Robyn's second stage work, the comic opera Beans and Buttons (1885), was also premiered at the Pickwick Theatre and used a libretto by William H. Lepere. Lepere also penned the libretto for his third opera, Jacinta, or The Maid of Manzanillo, which premiered at Saint Louis's Grand Opera House in 1893 with Robyn conducting the musical forces. Positively received in Saint Louis, this opera was toured by the Louise Beaudet Opera Bouffe Company for performances in Philadelphia and New York City in 1894. The Philadelphia critics were scathing in their reviews, but the New York critics had mixed reactions to the work.

Robyn's first composition to reach the New York stage was the song "It Was A Dream" which was inserted into the 1885 revival of F.C. Burnand and Michael Connolly's burlesque Ixion; or, The Man at the Wheel at the Comedy Theatre. He also wrote songs inserted into the original Broadway productions of A Chinese Honeymoon (1902) and The Sultan of Sulu (1902), and contributed incidental music to Hal Reid's The Gypsy Girl (1905, Star Theatre) which starred a young Mary Pickford.

In 1903 Robyn composed the score for his first major critical success on the stage, The Yankee Consul. A comic opera in two acts, the original production was produced by opera impresario Henry Wilson Savage at the Tremont Theatre in Boston. The work was a starring vehicle for Raymond Hitchcock who achieved a critical triumph in the role of Abijah Booze; a role he continued to excel in when the production moved to Broadway in 1904. While designated as a comic opera at its premiere, subsequently some musical theatre scholars have determined that it should really be considered a musical. Indeed when the score of the Yankee Consul was published its title page called it a "musical comedy". However, the inside of the score labeled the work as a "comic opera in two acts" and not a musical. A review of the Broadway production in Life by theatre critic James Stetson Metcalfe commented on the work's existence at the border between comic opera and musical comedy, and ultimately decided it better fit the definition of a comic opera. It said,

"The Yankee Consul comes pretty near being comic opera. Its plot is not of vast importance but its music is relevant and in good proportion to the text. It is difficult to classify the musical pieces of our time, and especially so to draw any hard and fast line between musical comedy and comic opera, but the latter definition seems to fit The Yankee Consul better than any other. The music of Mr. Robyn is not strikingly original, but it is tuneful and bright and written for the most part on good, although conventional, models. Some of the airs are bound to become popular."

== Partial list of compositions ==
=== Opera ===
- Manette, comic opera, libretto by Harriet Pittman premiered 20 August 1883, Pickwick Theatre, Saint Louis
- Beans and Buttons, comic opera, libretto by William H. Lepere, premiered 19 March 1885, Pickwick Theatre, Saint Louis
- Jacinta, or The Maid of Manzanillo, comic opera, libretto by William H. Lepere, premiered 23 May 1893, Grand Opera House, Saint Louis
- The Yankee Consul, comic opera, libretto by Henry Blossom, premiered 21 September 1903, Tremont Theatre, Boston
- Princess Beggar, "comedy opera in 2 Acts", libretto by Edward Paulton, premiered 18 January 1906, Utica, New York; Broadway premiere, 7 January 1907, Casino Theatre

=== Musical theatre ===
- The Yankee Tourist, musical in 3 Acts, lyrics by Wallace Irwin, book by Richard Harding Davis, based on Davis's 1906 play The Galloper, premiered 12 August 1907, Astor Theatre, Broadway
- My Sweetheart, musical, libretto by Thomas Railey and R.A. Roberts, premiered 10 September 1908, Albany, New York
- Will o' th' Wisp, musical comedy, book and lyrics by Walter Percival, opened in St. Louis on May 1, 1911.

=== Ballet ===
- Sylvia, premiered 14 June 1876

=== Sacred music ===
- The Ascension, cantata, text by Rev. Charles F.Blaisdell, published in April 1905
