= Henry Blossom =

American playwright and lyricist

Henry Martyn Blossom Jr. (May 10, 1866 – March 23, 1919) was an American writer, playwright, novelist, opera librettist, and lyricist. He first gained wide attention for his second novel, Checkers: A Hard Luck Story (1896), which was successfully adapted by Blossom into a 1903 Broadway play, Checkers. It was Blossom's first stage work and his first critical success in the theatre. The play in turn was adapted by others creatives into two silent films, one in 1913 and the other in 1919, and the play was the basis for the 1920 Broadway musical Honey Girl. Checkers was soon followed by Blossom's first critical success as a lyricist, the comic opera The Yankee Consul (1903), on which he collaborated with fellow Saint Louis resident and composer Alfred G. Robyn. This work was also adapted into a silent film in 1921. He later collaborated with Robyn again; writing the book and lyrics for their 1912 musical All for the Ladies.

Blossom had a lengthy and fruitful partnership as a librettist for the operetta composer Victor Herbert. He began his collaboration with Herbert with Mlle. Modiste (1905). This was followed by several other operettas, of which the best known are Mlle. Modiste (1905), The Red Mill (1906), The Princess Pat (1915), and Eileen (1917). For the 1916 musical The Century Girl, both he and Herbert collaborated with composer Irving Berlin. He also collaborated with Herbert on the musicals The Only Girl (1914) and The Velvet Lady (1919). The latter work premiered shortly before Blossom's death in 1919 and marked their final collaboration. Several of their works have been adapted into films.

Blossom also wrote the lyrics and books for Broadway musicals made with composers Leslie Stuart, Raymond Hubbell, and Zoel Parenteau. He was also involved with several shows that failed to reach Broadway.

== Biography ==
Born in St. Louis, Missouri, Blossom was the son of Henry Martyn Blossom and Susan S. Blossom. He was educated at the Stoddard School in Saint Louis, and worked for his father's insurance company before pursuing a career as a writer. His first published works were short stories in American magazines. In 1893 his first novel, Documents in Evidence, was published. His second novel, Checkers: A Hard Luck Story, was published in 1896. The plot involves a love story about a man trying to win approval of his would-be father-in-law as he faces career hurdles and tries to distance himself from gambling and horse racing. He adapted it into a successful play starring Thomas W. Ross. It was subsequently adapted into two silent films titled Checkers. The first film from 1913 used a screenplay by Eustace Hale Ball and Lawrence McGill, and was directed by Augustus Thomas. The second film, Checkers, was released in 1919. A second play by Blossom, A Fair Exchange, reached Broadway in 1905.

Blossom's first project as an opera librettist was for the 1903 comic opera The Yankee Consul which he created in collaboration with fellow Saint Louis resident and composer Alfred G. Robyn. This work premiered in Boston on 21 September 1903 at the Tremont Theatre in a production produced by Boston opera impresario Henry Wilson Savage. The work reached Broadway in 1904 and was a tremendous critical success for its star, Raymond Hitchcock, in the role of Abijah Booze. Blossom later collaborated with Robyn again on the 1912 Broadway musical All for the Ladies for which he wrote both the book and lyrics. His first musical, The Slim Princess, had debuted the year before and was created in collaboration with composer Leslie Stuart.

While Blossom worked with a number of composers during his career, his most frequent and fruitful partnership was with composer Victor Herbert with whom he created several popular light operas or operettas. These include Mlle. Modiste (1905), The Red Mill (1906), The Princess Pat (1915), and Eileen (1917). While musically more akin to opera or operetta than musical theatre, some of these works used a dramatic structure more closely related to the American musical; "meshing elements of comic opera into a musical comedy framework". The pair also created the "musical farce" The Only Girl, and collaborated with Irving Berlin on the 1916 musical The Century Girl. They also wrote the songs "It's Not the Uniform That Makes the Man" with A. Baldwin Sloane in 1917 and "I Want to Go Back to the War" with Percival Knight (music was by Raymond Hubbell) in 1919. Several of their works were adapted into films, including Mlle. Modiste which was the basis for the film Kiss Me Again (1931).

Blossom was also involved with several shows that failed to reach Broadway. He died from pneumonia in New York City at the age of 53. A member of The Lambs, his funeral service was organized by that organization.

== Partial list of works ==
=== Musicals ===
- The Slim Princess (1911)
- The Man from Cook's (1912)
- All for the Ladies (1912)
- The Only Girl (1914)
- The Century Girl (1916)
- Miss 1917 (1917)
- Follow the Girl (1918)
- The Velvet Lady (1919)
- Tintypes (1980; revue featuring music with lyrics by Blossom)

=== Novels ===
- Documents in Evidence (1893)
- Checkers: A Hard Luck Story (1896)

=== Plays ===
- Checkers (1903)
- A Fair Exchange (1905)

=== Operas and operettas ===
- The Yankee Consul (1903)
- Mlle. Modiste - libretto (1905)
- The Red Mill - book and lyrics (1906)
- The Prima Donna (1908)
- Baron Trenck (1911 premiere in London,; 1912 Broadway production)
- The Princess Pat - book and lyrics (1915)
- Eileen - lyrics (1917)

== Bibliography ==
- Ethan Mordden (1988). Broadway Babies: The People who Made the American Musical. Oxford University Press. ISBN 9780195054255.
- Richard Traubner (2003). Operetta: A Theatrical History. Psychology Press. ISBN 0-415-96641-8.
