= Ada Meade =

American actress

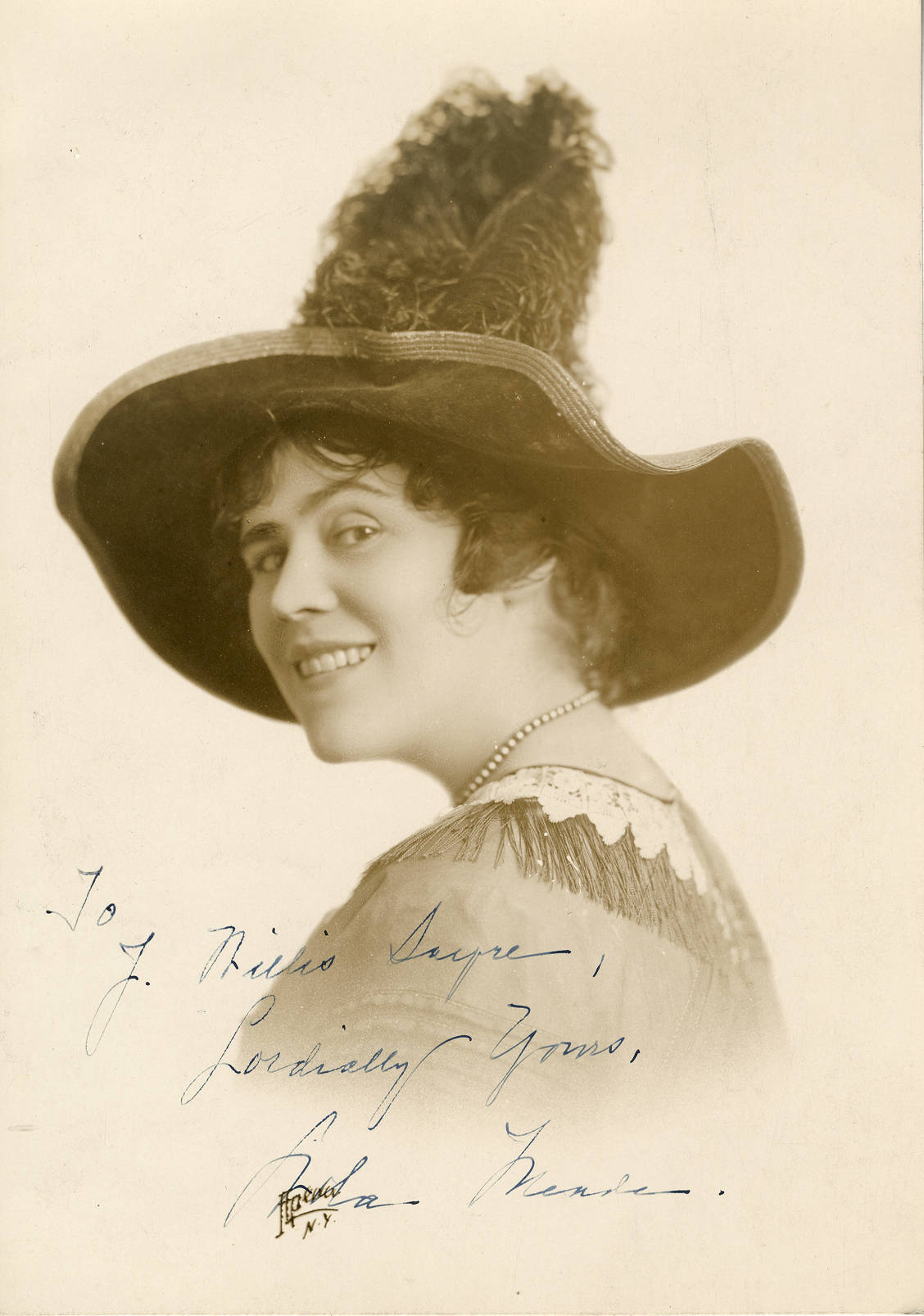
- Born: Ada Meade Saffarans; 1884; Lexington, Kentucky
- Died: February 4, 1965 (aged 80–81); Chicago
- Occupation: Actress

Ada Meade Saffarans (1884 - February 4, 1965) was an American actress known professionally as Ada Meade. She performed professionally in comic drama, comic opera, and musical comedy.

== Early years ==
Meade was born in 1884 in Lexington, Kentucky. Her father was Daniel T. Saffarans. Her mother was Ada Coles Meade Saffarrans, whose father was a planter in Mississippi and whose grandfather had been acting governor of Mississippi in the early 1800s. Mrs. Saffrans "was the greatest heiress of her day in Mississippi", but misfortune turned the family from a luxurious lifestyle to one of frugality and simplicity. The Saffarans also had a son and another daughter. Meade attended Sayre College and Nazareth Academy. After her mother died, family friends and supporters arranged a benefit singing performance that raised enough money for Meade to go to New York to study.

== Career ==
By age 18, Meade was performing in the operetta Babette in New York with Fritzi Scheff. She also performed with Scheff in Mlle. Modiste, and she gained attention when Scheff was unable to perform in the title role in an engagement in Cleveland, leading Meade to fill that role. Her success in that production resulted in formation of the Ada Meade Opera Company. Based in Dallas, Texas, that company presented Madame Sherry across the southern United States for two years, after which Meade studied in Paris for a year. Besides its touring presentations, the company performed locally with productions including The Fortune Teller and Fra Diavolo in 1908.

In addition to Babette and Mlle. Modiste, Broadway plays in which Meade performed included The Two Roses (1904), Fatinitza (1904), High Jinks (1913), The Red Canary (1914), A World of Pleasure (1915), Rambler Rose (1917), The Girl Behind the Gun (1918), and Elsie (1923).

Meade was prima donna at the Winter Garden in New Orleans in 1907. In 1924, she was the lead actress for the McGarry theatrical company, whose activities included presenting the musical comedy Irene in Buffalo, New York.

Meade retired from performing in 1925 and began a career in business. She worked for a paper company in Niagara Falls before moving to Chicago, where she worked with Marshall Field & Company. After that, she was a secretary for the American Bar Association, from which she retired in 1964.

== Personal life and death ==
On February 4, 1965, Meade died in Chicago. Her funeral service was in Lexington, and she was buried there.

== Ada Meade Theatre ==
In 1913, the Hippodrome Theater in Lexington was sold to a group of businessmen in the city. They had the building remodeled and renamed it the Ada Meade Theatre to honor the actress. It was demolished in 1954. It was mostly a venue for vaudeville, but legitimate theater was performed there in 1922-23 when Lexington's Opera House was closed. Meade performed in her namesake theater on April 9, 1918, as part of a bond rally and on January 8 and 9, 1923, starring in the musical comedy Elsie.
