= Quade Winter =

American singer and composer (1951–2019)

Edward Quade Winter (April 8, 1951 – October 8, 2019) was an American composer, musical restorer and translator, specializing in the light operas of Victor Herbert. He began his career as a performer, singing opera for over two decades.

== Early years and singing career ==
Winter was born in Pendleton, Oregon, one of five children, including four sons of Melvin Winter, a car dealer and former Pendleton mayor, and Margaret Winter, a housewife. As a child, Winter was enchanted by the comic operas of Gilbert and Sullivan and by science. He graduated from Pendleton High School in 1970 and the University of Oregon (1978) with degrees in theater and music.

He began a musical theatre career but soon turned to classical music. He graduated from the Merola Opera Program in 1980. While there, he sang with San Francisco Opera. He then began a career as an operatic tenor, performing roles in opera and oratorio, during the next 23 years, in Germany (where he lived in the 1980s), Austria, the United States, Canada, Mexico, the Dominican Republic, and elsewhere. For example, in 1993, Winter sang Calaf in Turandot with New York City Opera. In 1994, he sang Herod in Richard Strauss's Salome with Virginia Opera, a role he repeated in 1999 at Bellas Artes Opera in Mexico City, and in 2000 with Opera de las Americas in the Dominican Republic. He played Aegistheus in Strauss's Elektra with the Canadian Opera Company in 1996, repeating the role with the Hawaii Opera Theatre in 1999. He was proud of his appearances at Carnegie Hall and La Scala in Milan.

== Composing, translating and orchestrating ==
In 1996, Winter's first opera score, replacing Arthur Sullivan's lost score to Thespis, was given its world premiere by the Ohio Light Opera, where Winter then became the composer-in-residence. His second score, The Carp, replacing Alfred Cellier's lost score, was requested in 1998 by The Gilbert and Sullivan Archive for its Web Opera series. It was orchestrated and performed by the Ohio Light Opera in 1999.

From 1997 to 2004, Winter was Composer-in-Residence at the Ohio Light Opera, and oversaw productions of many of his opera translations, including Boccaccio (von Suppé), The Gypsy Baron (Strauss), The Merry Widow (Lehàr) and Die Fledermaus (Strauss). The OLO commissioned a number of critical editions of seldom performed operettas, starting with Victor Herbert's Eileen (1997), utilizing Herbert's original manuscripts in the collection of the Library of Congress. Similar reconstructions followed: Herbert's The Red Mill (2001) and Sweethearts (2002), and Reginald De Koven's Robin Hood (2004). These works were issued as CDs on the Newport and Albany labels.

In 2009, Winter restored Victor Herbert's The Magic Knight. He has performed similar services for various organizations, including the Rodgers and Hammerstein Organization's new engraving of Hammerstein's Carmen Jones. In later years, he sang with the Pendleton Men’s Chorus for whom he translated and arranged music, also arranging music for the Oregon East Symphony.

Winter died of cardiac arrest on October 8, 2019.
