= Mlle. Modiste =

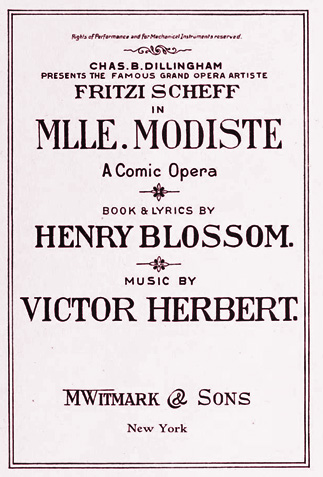
- 1905 vocal score
- Music: Victor Herbert
- Lyrics: Henry Blossom
- Book: Henry Blossom
- Premiere: December 25, 1905: Knickerbocker Theatre; New York City
- Productions: 1905 Broadway; 1906 Broadway revival 1907 Broadway revival 1907 Broadway revival 1913 Broadway revival 1929 Broadway revival

Mlle. Modiste is an operetta in two acts composed by Victor Herbert with a libretto by Henry Blossom. It concerns hat shop girl Fifi, who longs to be an opera singer, but who is such a good hat seller that her employer, Mme. Cecil, discourages her in her ambitions and exploits her commercial talents. Also, Fifi loves Etienne de Bouvray, who returns her love, but his uncle, Count Henri, opposes their union. The operetta features the song "Kiss Me Again".

After tryouts in Trenton, New Jersey and Washington, D.C., in October 1905, and a two-month tour, the operetta premiered on Broadway on December 25, 1905, at the Knickerbocker Theatre, where it ran for 202 performances. John Lund was the music director. It was revived the next season, followed by extensive touring when it was replaced at the theatre by Herbert's next piece, The Red Mill. It was frequently revived early in the 20th century.

== Background ==
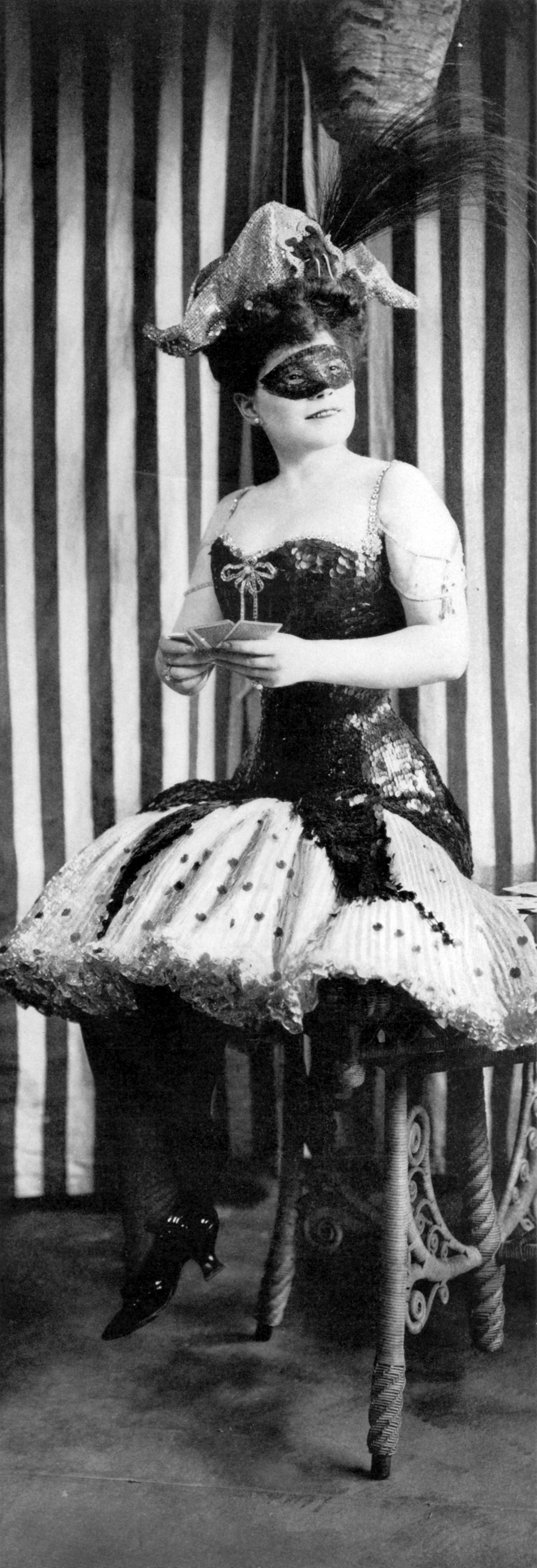
Fritzi Scheff in Mlle. Modiste (1905)

Viennese soprano Fritzi Scheff had already built a following at the Metropolitan Opera when Victor Herbert engaged her to appear in his operettas for an astonishing $1,000 a week. She starred in four of his operettas, beginning with Babette (1903). Mlle. Modiste was the most successful of these. During the curtain calls of Babette, she pulled Herbert on stage and planted a big, sexy kiss on his cheek. "The Kiss" generated considerable comment, and when Herbert wrote Mlle. Modiste, two years later, he wrote one of his most famous melodies for her, "Kiss Me Again". After Modiste closed, Scheff toured it for years.

Henry Blossom and Herbert collaborated on several more operettas, including The Red Mill (1906), The Princess Pat (1915), and Eileen (1917). Modiste is typical of their proto-feminist plotlines involving an orphaned young woman, exploited by her employer, but whose feisty spirit leads her to success.

After the original production, the piece returned to Broadway at the Knickerbocker briefly in 1906, and, in between national tours, at both the original Academy of Music and the Knickerbocker in 1907, at the Globe Theatre in 1913 and at Jolson's 59th Street Theatre in 1929, among many other revivals and tours through the early 20th century. Later revivals have included several revivals by the Light Opera of Manhattan in the late 1970s and early 1980s; and a production by Ohio Light Opera in 2009. A 1926 silent film version starring Corinne Griffith was broadly adapted, but well received. A "talking" film version called Kiss Me Again was made later in the late 1920s by First National.

== Synopsis ==
Act I

Fifi is a shop girl, selling hats in Mme. Cécile's shop in the Rue de la Paix in Paris. She is the shop's best saleswoman, so Mme. Cécile plots to keep her there for free by marrying her off to her artist son, Gaston. But Fifi dreams of a career on the stage. In addition, Fifi and French army Captain Etienne de Bouvray, Viscount de St. Mar, are in love. But his uncle, the old aristocratic Count de St. Mar, is scandalized that Etienne would marry a shop girl. He threatens to cut off Etienne's allowance and to disinherit him. Fifi hopes that a stage career would allow Etienne to marry her because no one need be ashamed of such an alliance.

One day, when she is alone in the shop, a rich and eccentric American theatre promoter, Hiram Bent, bumbles in. Fifi tells him of her lifelong ambition, singing a wonderful number for him that serves as a kind of "audition" piece, because she shows him exactly how she would play three very different kinds of roles, if given the opportunity (the last of these is "Kiss Me Again"). He loans her $1000 to help her achieve this goal and win over her sweetheart's crotchety uncle, Count Henri. She leaves for Vienna to develop her talent.

Act II

A year later, Etienne is still pining for Fifi, who has not written him during that time, but who has, meanwhile, become a great success throughout Europe. Etienne and his sister, Marie Louise, are hosting a charity ball at the Chateau de St. Mar. Unknown to Etienne, Hiram Bent has arranged for Fifi to sing at the ball. The Count, learning of this, is enraged and forbids Fifi to sing. However, Hiram arranges for Etienne to "discover" Fifi's presence. The two stage a "performance" for the Count in which Fifi defends the Count and Etienne calls him a "stupid old idiot". The Count, impressed by Fifi's sincerity and her new position, as well as by Etienne's behavior, allows Fifi to sing, and ultimately to marry Etienne.

== Roles and original cast ==
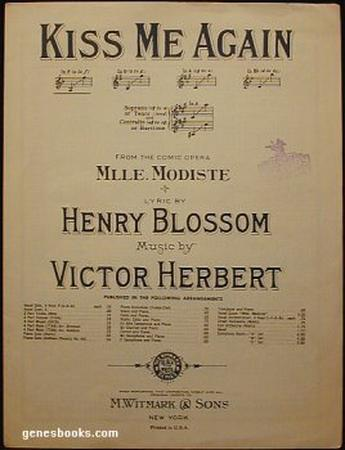
Sheet music for "Kiss Me Again"

- Mme. Cecile, owner of a Parisian hat shop (mezzo-soprano) – Josephine Bartlett
- Fifi (Mlle. Modiste), clerk in the hat shop (soprano) – Fritzi Scheff
- Count Henri de Bouvray (baritone) – William Pruette
- Etienne de Bouvray, nephew of the Count (tenor) – Walter Percival
- Hiram Bent, American entrepreneur (bass) – Claude Gillingwater
- Fanchette and Nanette, Mme. Cecile's daughters – Edna Fassett and Blanche Morrison
- Gaston, an artist, Mme. Cecile's son – Leo Mars
- Marie Louise de Bouvray, Etienne's sister – Louise Le Baron
- Lieut. Rene La Motte, engaged to Marie Louise – Howard Chambers
- Mrs. Hiram Bent – Bertha Holly
- General Le Marquis de Villefranche – George Schraeder
- Francois, porter at Mme. Cecile's – R. W. Hunt
- Bebe, dancer at Folies Bergere – La Mora
- Fleurette – Ada Meade

== Musical numbers ==
Act 1

- Furs and Feathers, Buckles and Bows – Fanchette, Nanette and Girls
- When the Cat's Away the Mice Will Play – Fanchette, Nanette and Mme. Cecile
- The Time, the Place and the Girl – Capt. Etienne de Bouvray and Chorus
- If I Were on the Stage (Kiss Me Again) – Fifi
- Love Me, Love My Dog – Gaston
- Hats Make the Woman – Fifi and Female Chorus
- Finale – Company

Act 2

- I Want What I Want When I Want It – Henri de Bouvray
- Ze English Language – Gaston
- The Mascot of the Troop (Mascot of the Moon) – Fifi and Male Ensemble
- The Dear Little Girl Who is Good – Lieut. Rene La Motte and Female Ensemble
- The Keokuk Culture Club – Mrs. Hiram Bent and Ensemble
- The Nightingale and the Star – Fifi
- Finale – Entire Company

== Recordings ==
In the early years of the 20th century, the composer conducted an acoustic recording on wax cylinder of the ballet music from Mlle. Modiste; it was later reissued on LP. A recording of Mlle. Modiste (which contained Naughty Marietta on the other side of the record) starring Felix Knight and Doretta Morrow was released in 1953. An abridged recording of Mlle. Modiste was made by Reader's Digest as part of its 1960 album Treasury of Great Operettas, starring Anna Moffo and conducted by Lehman Engel. The first complete recording was issued on cassette in 1986 on the Demand Performance label; a transcription of a radio broadcast, it starred Gordon Macrae and Dorothy Kirsten. A complete set, recorded live with piano accompaniment, was made by the Comic Opera Guild of Ann Arbor, Michigan in 2004. In 2009, Albany Records released a two-CD set of the complete operetta, featuring Ohio Light Opera in live performance conducted by Michael Borowitz.
