= Sweethearts (1938 film) =

1938 film by Robert Zigler Leonard, W. S. Van Dyke

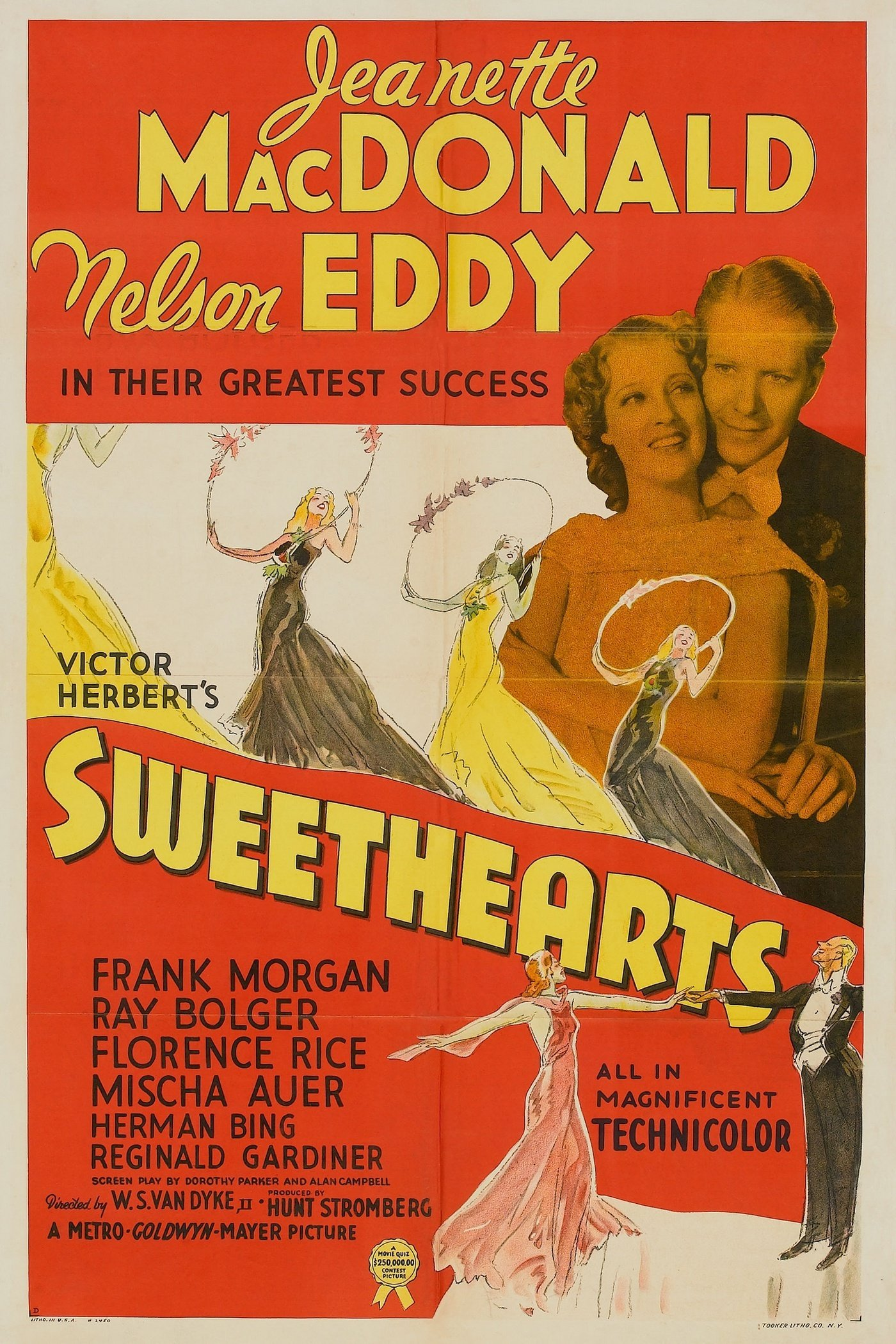
- Theatrical release poster
- Directed by: W.S. Van Dyke
- Written by: book: Fred de Gresac; Harry B. Smith; Robert B. Smith
- Screenplay by: Alan Campbell; Dorothy Parker; Laura Perelman; S.J. Perelman
- Based on: Sweethearts (1913) by Fred de Gresac; Harry B. Smith; Robert Bache Smith
- Produced by: Hunt Stromberg
- Starring: Jeanette MacDonald; Nelson Eddy; Frank Morgan; Ray Bolger; Florence Rice; Mischa Auer; Herman Bing; Reginald Gardiner
- Cinematography: Oliver T. Marsh; Allen M. Davey
- Edited by: Robert Kern
- Music by: Victor Herbert; Herbert Stothart
- Color process: Technicolor
- Production company: Metro-Goldwyn-Mayer
- Distributed by: Loew's, Inc.
- Release date: December 22, 1938
- Running time: 114 minutes
- Country: United States
- Language: English
- Budget: $1.9 million
- Box office: $2 million (domestic earnings) $1.2 million (foreign earnings)

Sweethearts is a 1938 American Technicolor musical romance film directed by W.S. Van Dyke and starring Jeanette MacDonald and Nelson Eddy. The screenplay, by Dorothy Parker and Alan Campbell, uses the “play within a play” device: a Broadway production of the 1913 Victor Herbert operetta is the setting for another pair of sweethearts, the stars of the show. It was the first color film for Nelson or Jeanette (as well as MGM's first three strip Technicolor feature). It was their first film together without uniforms or period costumes. Filming started on June 16, 1938 and concluded on September 13, 1938.

== Plot ==
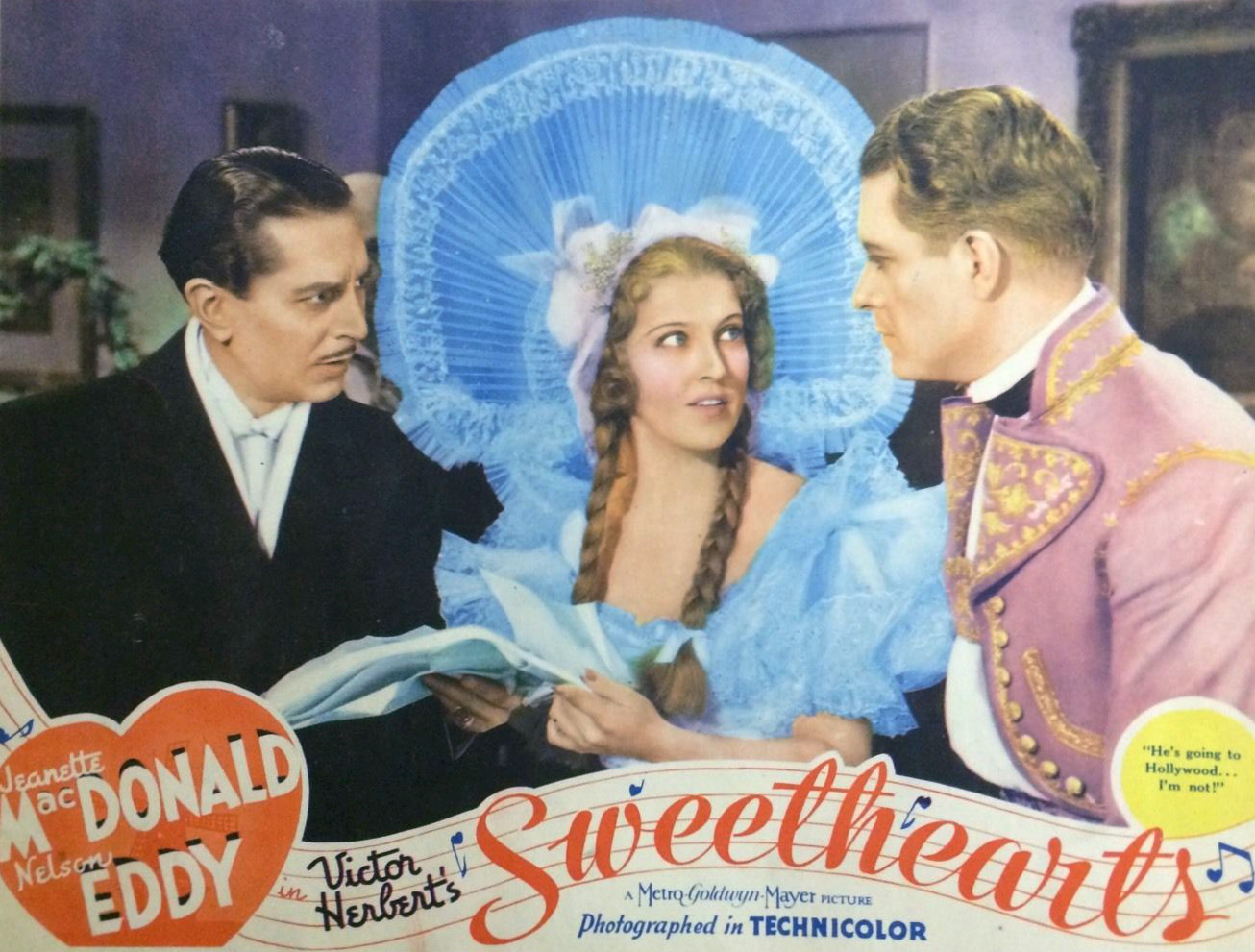
Lobby card

Married Broadway stars Gwen Marlowe and Ernest Lane are appearing in a 6-year run of Victor Herbert's operetta Sweethearts. Norman Trumpett, a Hollywood talent scout, is under pressure to recruit Marlowe and Lane for his studio, which their Broadway producer Felix Lehman is equally determined to prevent.

The couple's attempts to rest and be together are repeatedly thwarted by professional and personal demands made on their time, talents and money by Lehman and their own theatrical families - who also live with them. Frustrated beyond endurance and seduced by Trumpett's idyllic (and false) description of working conditions in Hollywood, they decide to quit the show and take the Hollywood offer. (In guise of buying a new wardrobe for the trip Jeanette MacDonald models fashions of 1938.)

This spells “the end” for the Broadway production, news so devastating that constantly feuding playwright Leo Kronk and composer Oscar Engel stop fighting long enough for Lehman, Kronk and company to hatch a counter-plot. By convincing Marlowe that Lane is having an affair with his pretty secretary Kay Jordan they split-up the happy couple, putting an end to the Hollywood deal and allowing Lehman to mount two separate touring companies of the show, each with one star and one understudy.

Delighted with the outcome, Engel produces Kronk's new play - which closes in a week. From a Variety review of the play, Marlowe and Lane realize they were tricked and join forces to confront Lehman, but nonetheless resume the Broadway run of Sweethearts together.

== Cast ==
- Jeanette MacDonald as Gwen Marlowe
- Nelson Eddy as Ernest Lane
- Frank Morgan as Felix Lehman
- Ray Bolger as Hans
- Florence Rice as Kay Jordan
- Mischa Auer as Leo Kronk
- Herman Bing as Oscar Engel
- George Barbier as Benjamin Silver
- Reginald Gardiner as Norman Trumpett
- Fay Holden as Hannah
- Allyn Joslyn as Dink
- Lucile Watson as Mrs. Marlowe
- Gene Lockhart as Augustus
- Kathleen Lockhart as Aunt Amelia
- Berton Churchill as Sheridan
- Terry Kilburn as Brother
- Raymond Walburn as Orlando
- Douglas McPhail as Harvey
- Betty Jaynes as Una
- Olin Howland as Appleby
- Dalies Frantz as Concert Pianist

== Awards ==
The film was nominated for two Academy Awards: Best Sound Recording (Douglas Shearer) and Best Music, Scoring (Herbert Stothart). The film was MGM's first feature-length color film, and it received an Honorary Academy Award for its colour cinematography. It also won the Photoplay Medal of Honor for the Best Picture of 1938.
