= Jan Hus Presbyterian Church =

Church in Manhattan, New York

Avenue Church NYC
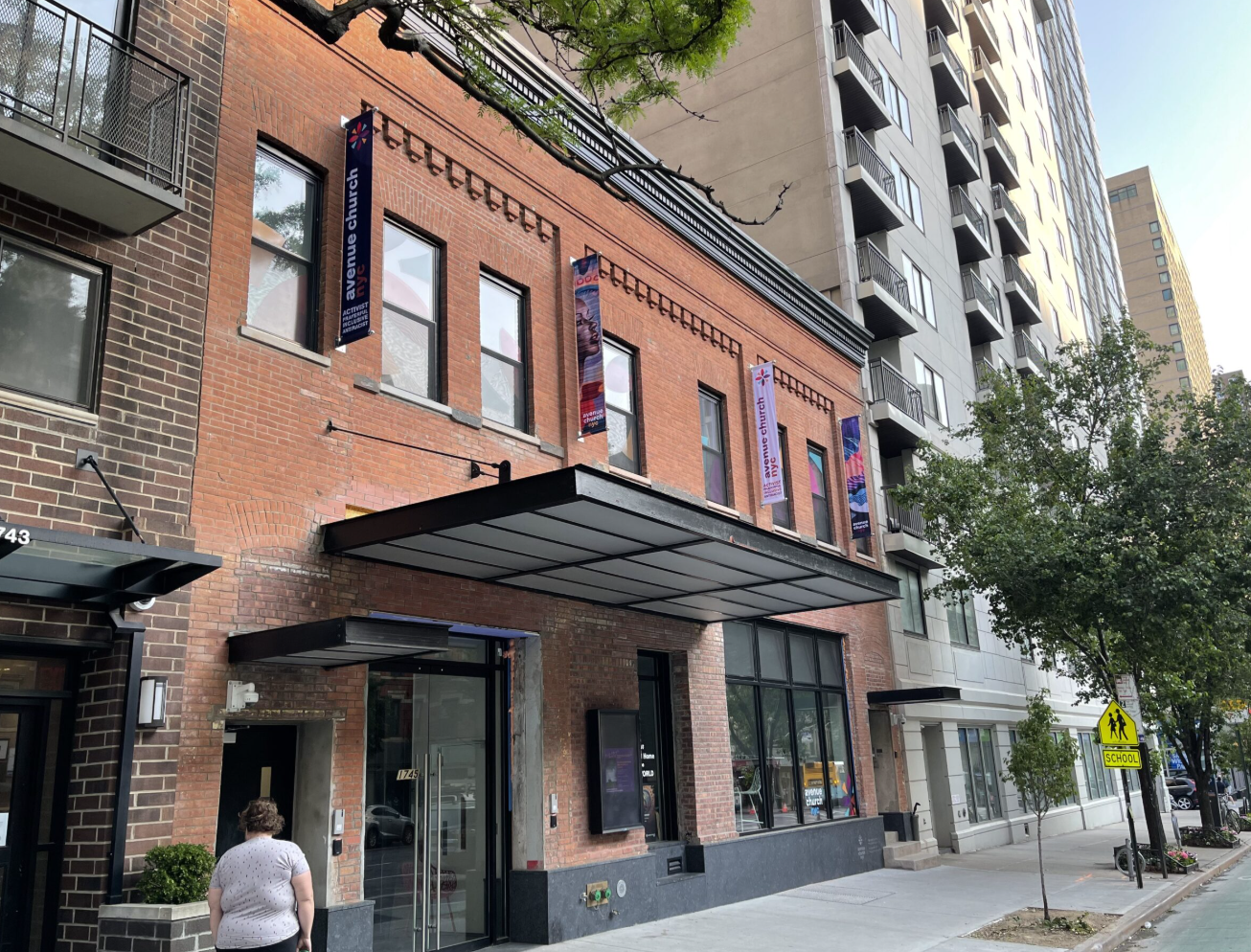
- Avenue Church NYC
- 40°46′47.3″N 73°56′51.4″W
- Location: 1745 First Avenue, New York City, New York 10128
- Country: United States
- Denomination: Presbyterian Church USA
- Website: www.avenuechurchnyc.org

History
- Founded: 1877

Architecture
- Functional status: Active
- Architect: R.H. Robertson
- Architectural type: Bohemian Gothic Revival
- Completed: 1888

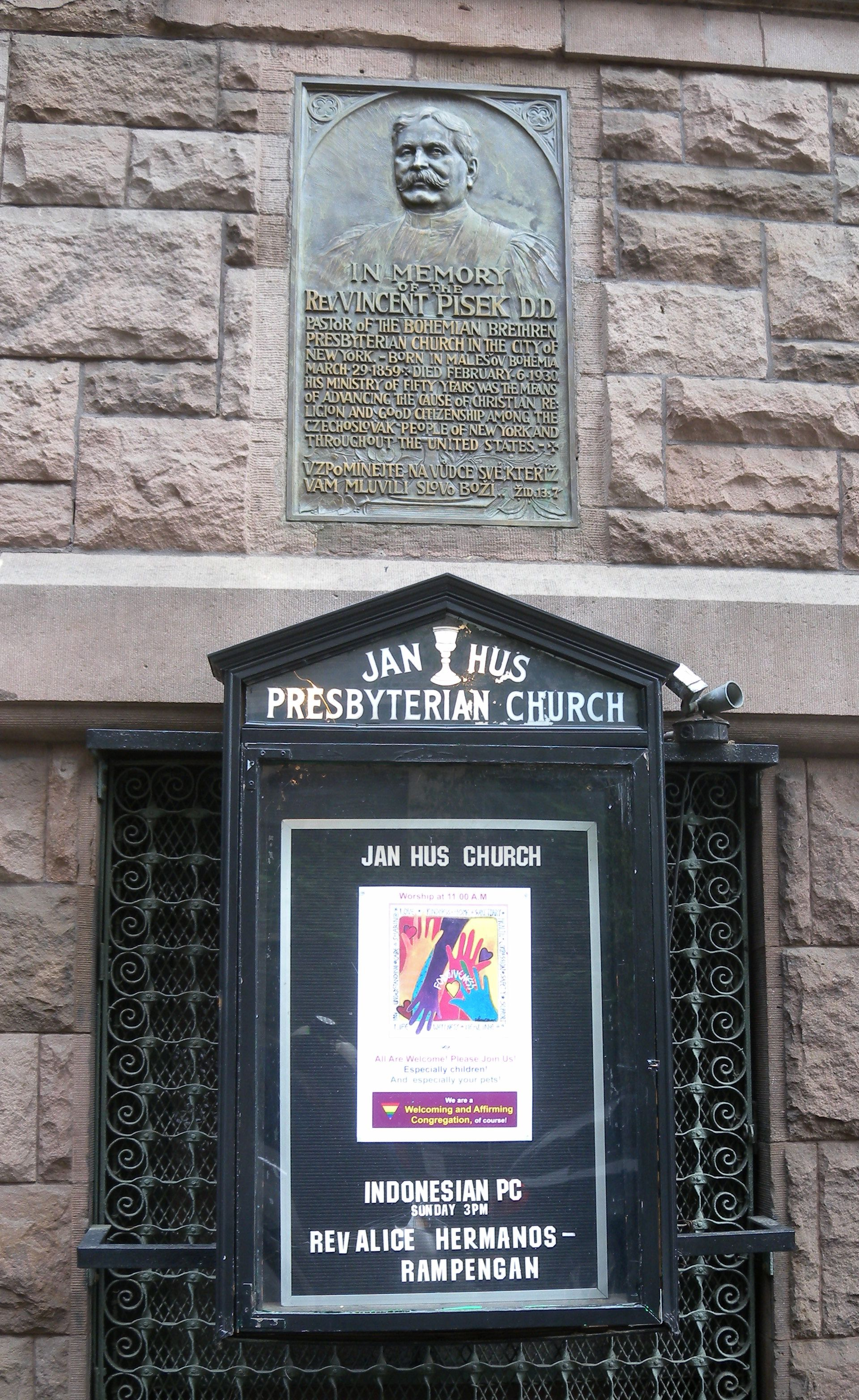
Plaque of Vincent Picek at the Jan Hus Presbyterian Church

Avenue Church NYC, formerly known as Jan Hus Presbyterian Church, is a Christian congregation on the Upper East Side of Manhattan in New York City, associated with the Presbyterian Church USA. It is the oldest historically Czech Presbyterian congregation in the US, having been founded in 1877, and their original church building was opened in 1888.

The church was originally named for Jan Hus, a Bohemian priest who was a theologian and reformer. The church is in the area that was once known as Little Bohemia. Once a center of the Czech community, the church now has a diverse and inclusive congregation.

The church ran an active Neighborhood House that promoted music, theater, and culture and operated a homeless outreach program. The church basement includes a 150-seat theatre that was home to Gilbert and Sullivan performing groups almost continuously from 1952 to 1975. Chicago City Limits performed there throughout the 1980s. Since then, several arts organizations have been based at the theatre.

In 2019, the Session of Jan Hus Presbyterian sold the 23,000-square-foot (2,100 m^{2}) church building located at 351 East 74th Street, New York City, New York, in Manhattan's Upper East Side to purchase a more modern facility to meet the growing needs of the congregation and their large community outreach missions. Their new property, located at 1745 First Avenue, New York City, New York, opened in late 2020.

== History ==
The church was founded in 1877 when Gustav Alexy, a Hungarian missionary, wanted to work among the Czech community. The building was designed by R.H. Robertson and built in 1888, and bears the inscription "Truth Prevails", a famous Jan Hus saying. The church sits down the block from the Byzantine Moderne-style Greek Orthodox Archdiocesan Cathedral of the Holy Trinity.

When Pastor Alexy died in 1880, the newly official Presbyterian Church asked 21-year-old Vincent Pisek to take over as leader. At the turn of the century Czech families immigrated to America in large numbers settling in New York. The followers of Jan Hus had been persecuted or forced out of Bohemia. Pisek was "free-thinking" and performed marriages between men and women from different ethnic groups. His enthusiasm to help make these marriages was a part of what helped to build his church.

With thousands of Czech parishioners when the church started, the congregation has changed greatly with the Czech community dispersing over the years. By the 1950s, Jan Hus Church was no longer predominantly Czech. Jan Hus Church has not had a Czech pastor since the 1960s.

Ray Bagnuolo became the pastor August 2, 2009.

Jan Hus was among the first churches to become an Open and Affirming congregation for the full inclusion of Gay, Lesbian, Bisexual, and Transgender people in church life The church is now one of many congregations associated with More Light Presbyterians.

== Jan Hus Neighborhood House ==
Through the efforts Vincent Pisek of Malesov, the successor of Gustav Alexy of Roznov, the new modern Czech Brethren Presbyterian House was built in 1888.

Among its many community efforts Jan Hus Church organized a homeless outreach program called HOAP, which would late become the anti-hunger nonprofit, the Urban Outreach Center of NYC. The program HOAP assists more than 50 guests with immediate responses to their physical needs. The program also allows the homeless to use the church's address for their mailing address, and receives mail for over 500 people.

In 1888, the J.H. & C.S. Odell Company installed a "Size No. 9" organ in the church, The Odell Size 9 organ had a case of "appropriate and approved design, made of Walnut, Chestnut, or Ash," with "the large speaking pipes displayed in front to be gilded, silvered, or richly ornamented in gold and colors." The organ measured 16 feet (4.9 m) high, 11 feet, 3 inches wide, and 7 feet, 3 inches deep. This organ was removed in 1969 by Alan Laufman and Guy Henderson, but the organ case and display pipes were left in the church.

Like many churches in New York City, Jan Hus rents out its space for community and artistic events; however, Jan Hus has been dedicated to this mission for its community for decades. In 1914, Atherton Pisek and the Jan Hus community raised funds to open the Neighborhood House and in 1915, the church built its Neighborhood House to celebrate Czech culture: the folk music, the dance, marionette theatre, and music. Located on the easternmost portion of our building, the Neighborhood House was to be a cultural and social center for the Bohemian people, a place for art and music, job training, a dental clinic, clubs, athletics, language classes and more. While expanded beyond the Czech community, the Neighborhood House continues to promote music, theater, and culture.

== Jan Hus Playhouse Theater ==
The Jan Hus theater at 351 East 74th Street presented and housed several art events and organizations.

From 1952 to 1967, the 150-seat theater served as the home of the American Savoyards. In May 1960, The Actors' Co-op performed a revival of the Insect Comedy, with Barbra Streisand in her first New York role.

From 1969 to 1975, the theater became the home of LOOM (Light Opera of Manhattan), which was an Off-Broadway repertory theater company performing 52 weeks per year. Both LOOM and the American Savoyards employed comedian Raymond Allen.

From 1981 to 1992, Chicago City Limits (a New York City improv comedy troupe) made Jan Hus their home. Chicago City Limits performed seven nights a week, with Friday night serving as Stand-Up Comedian Night, hosting Robin Williams, Jerry Seinfeld, Jon Stewart, Paul Reiser, Brett Butler, Larry Miller, and Bill Irwin. The Czechoslovak-American Marionette Theatre Company was also based at Jan Hus in the 1990s. The puppets that helped found the marionette theater company were discovered at Jan Hus Church.

Starting in 2006, The Remarkable Theater Brigade used Jan Hus as their home for several productions. In 2007, Remarkable Theater Brigade brought Vox Novus and its Composer's Voice Concert Series to Jan Hus Church where the two organizations in collaboration with Jan Hus have a monthly concert performance since June of that year. In 2008, Remarkable Theater Brigade produced Glory Denied, an opera by Tom Cipullo adapted from a book by journalist Tom Philpott about Jim Thompson, the longest-held American prisoner of war in Vietnam.

Several other art performances and art organizations have performed at Jan Hus Playhouse, including: Kenny & The Virgin Mary, 2006 international Electro-Acoustic Music Festival, and the Jan Hus Homeless Theatre Troupe.

== See also ==
- Evangelical Church of Czech Brethren

== Articles ==
Second Chance for Star-Studded Theater With a community-minded focus, drama in the basement of an East Side church, By Deirdre Donovan, Our Town, April 28, 2010
