= Light Opera of Manhattan =

William Mount-Burke, LOOM's founder and artistic director

Light Opera of Manhattan, known as LOOM, was an off-Broadway repertory theatre company that produced light operas, including the works of Gilbert and Sullivan and European and American operettas, 52 weeks per year, in New York City between 1968 and 1989.

Founded by William Mount-Burke, LOOM's first long-term home was in the Jan Hus theatre from the late 1960s to 1975, where it succeeded another small light opera company, the American Savoyards. At the Jan Hus, LOOM performed predominantly the Savoy operas of Gilbert and Sullivan, such as The Pirates of Penzance, The Mikado and H.M.S. Pinafore. Led by conductor-director Mount-Burke, principal comedian Raymond Allen and choreographer/stage manager Jerry Gotham, the company mentored many young actors and singers who went on to careers on Broadway or elsewhere in theatre or music.

In 1975, the company moved across the street to a legitimate Off-Broadway theatre, the Eastside Playhouse. There it expanded its repertoire beyond Gilbert and Sullivan to American and continental operettas, such as those of Victor Herbert, Rudolf Friml, Franz Lehár, Sigmund Romberg, Jacques Offenbach and Johann Strauss II. LOOM was often featured on WQXR radio.

By 1979, diabetes had blinded William Mount-Burke, but he continued to conduct and even to direct new productions. The company remained strong until 1984, when Mount-Burke died and the company's playhouse was closed and subsequently demolished. After this, led by Allen and Gotham, with music director Todd Ellison, the company played in a series of theatres around New York that challenged its ability to keep its Upper East Side audience, and it was forced constantly to raise funds. In 1986, the company closed, opening for its final seasons from 1987 to 1989.

== Beginning years at the Jan Hus ==
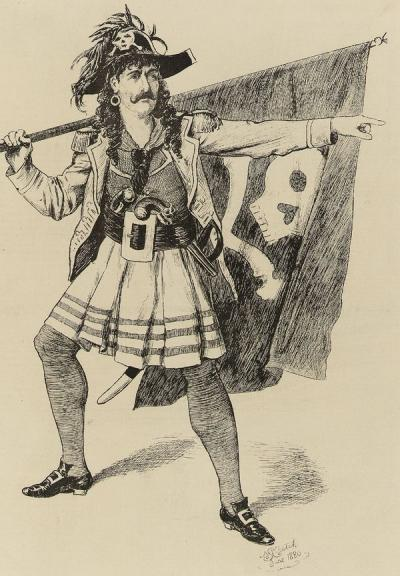
The Pirates of Penzance was LOOM's first production in 1968

In the fall of 1968, William Mount-Burke (1936–1984), the former director of The Miami Light Opera and The Stamford Symphony, took steps to start an Off-Broadway company specializing in the comic operas of Gilbert and Sullivan. He first presented a free showcase performance of The Pirates of Penzance at his apartment in New York City. The success of this performance encouraged Mount-Burke to move forward with his plan. The producer and his company offered a number of free performances at St. Michael's Church on West 99th Street in Manhattan. In 1969, the company moved into the 247-seat basement gymnasium of The Jan Hus House on East 74th Street, previously the home of Dorothy Raedler's American Savoyards, intending to play a limited engagement. However, it stayed at the Jan Hus for almost seven years, performing predominantly the Savoy operas of Gilbert and Sullivan, such as Pirates, The Mikado and H.M.S. Pinafore. By 1970, Mount-Burke had formed a non-profit organization, The Light Opera of Manhattan, which came to be known as LOOM; by 1974, the company was playing 9 of the Gilbert and Sullivan operas in repertory and soon added two more.

Allen as Sir Joseph in H.M.S. Pinafore

Raymond Allen, who had previously sung with the American Savoyards and made guest appearances at New York City Opera and the City Center Gilbert & Sullivan Company, was the leading comic actor for most of the company's performances. Allen wrote an introduction to The Best of Gilbert & Sullivan: 42 Favorite Songs from the G&S Repertoire, a songbook published by Chappell Music Company in 1974. The book includes many photographs of LOOM productions and states that LOOM's year-round performing season was the longest of any company in the United States.

Under LOOM's Equity union contract, casting consisted of seven union principals and over twenty non-union actors who could receive their Equity membership after an apprenticeship with the company. This arrangement was unique among full-time theatre companies in New York. The pay for the non-union actors was nominal, but many young actor/singers who aspired to be full-time professionals were able to receive training and could work their way up from the ensemble to featured roles in the course of a year.

Many future New York City Opera and Broadway professionals started out at LOOM, including writer/director Gerard Alessandrini (Forbidden Broadway); Craig Schulman (Les Misérables); Robert Cuccioli (Jekyll & Hyde); Stephen O'Mara, opera singer; Penny Orloff, City Opera and Broadway; Carolyne Mas, recording artist; Susan Marshall, recording artist and songwriter; Michael Connolly (Amadeus); Larry Raiken (Woman of the Year, Big River, and Follies); and Joan Lader, recipient of the 2016 Tony Honors for Excellence in Theatre and vocal coach to numerous performers, such as Madonna, Sutton Foster and Frederica von Stade. Macaulay Culkin played Tom Tucker (the juvenile "midshipmite") in H.M.S. Pinafore.

LOOM initially bought a number of its costumes and stage properties from the American Savoyards. It designed its own sets and other costumes, seeking to achieve a professional appearance in a small space on a small budget. The orchestra consisted of two players: pianist Brian Molloy, a graduate of Juilliard, who played every score by heart, and Mount-Burke himself, covering the organ and timpani, while conducting the performance.

== The peak years ==
=== Moving up to the Eastside Playhouse ===
The Eastside Playhouse

In 1975, the company moved out of the Jan Hus to the legitimate Off-Broadway Eastside Playhouse, just across E. 74th Street. This 284-seat house was still intimate, but the company could generate substantially more revenues than it could in the Jan Hus basement. In addition, the theatre had better stage facilities, good seating, stage lighting and a balcony. All the sight-lines were good, whereas in the Jan Hus there were vertical poles interfering with some views. At Jan Hus, the company's staging had been designed to refer to the positions of these poles, and even after the company moved to the Eastside Playhouse, choreographer Jerry Gotham (a former Broadway dancer) taught the staging of the shows in the repertory by reference to the imaginary positions of the poles, as they had existed at Jan Hus. While at the Eastside Playhouse, LOOM published a music book containing an introduction by Raymond Allen and many photographs of the company in its Gilbert and Sullivan productions.

Beginning in 1975 and through the 1980s, LOOM added American and continental operettas to its roster, eventually carrying over 30 shows in its repertory. Its first non-G&S show was Victor Herbert's Naughty Marietta, with guest artist Joan Sena-Grande in the title role, to open its tenure at the Eastside Playhouse in 1975. Larry Raiken played Captain Dick Warrington. The next operetta with a guest star was Rudolph Friml's 1925 hit, The Vagabond King, with Broadway veteran Jeanne Beauvais as Huguette.

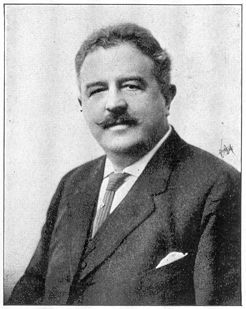
LOOM revived several Victor Herbert works

In the mid-1970s, the company asked Alice Hammerstein Mathias (Oscar Hammerstein II's daughter) to create a new translation of Franz Lehár's The Merry Widow. The translation is lighter and focuses more on the humorous aspects of the show than some of the standard translations. With Jeanne Beauvais again in the lead, The Merry Widow was a success that increased LOOM's audiences and received positive reviews. Friml's The Vagabond King and Rose-Marie; Sigmund Romberg's The Student Prince, The Desert Song, The New Moon; Herbert's Naughty Marietta, The Red Mill, Mlle. Modiste and The Fortune Teller; Jacques Offenbach's The Grand Duchess of Gerolstein; and Johann Strauss II's A Night in Venice, and others became favorites of the company. The Student Prince and Mlle. Modiste became showcases for Georgia McEver, LOOM's leading soprano for several seasons.

Alice Hammerstein Mathias then prepared a new book and lyrics for Victor Herbert's Babes in Toyland, which had not been given a professional New York production in many years. Her original story centered on two unhappy children who run away to Toyland but are eventually reconciled with their parents. Children were invited onstage from the audience to "wind up" the choristers who played toys in the "March of the Wooden Soldiers." Babes was a perennial hit for LOOM, offering parents an alternative to Radio City's annual Christmas show, and Victor Herbert's beloved tunes delighted older audience members. LOOM played Babes in Toyland each year from Thanksgiving through New Year's.

In the 1970s, LOOM also presented a series of September concerts at the Naumburg Bandshell, in Central Park, which were broadcast live over WNYC radio. The company was also featured on NBC's Today program, as well as numerous times on WQXR's The Listening Room.

=== The Festival Year and bright hopes ===
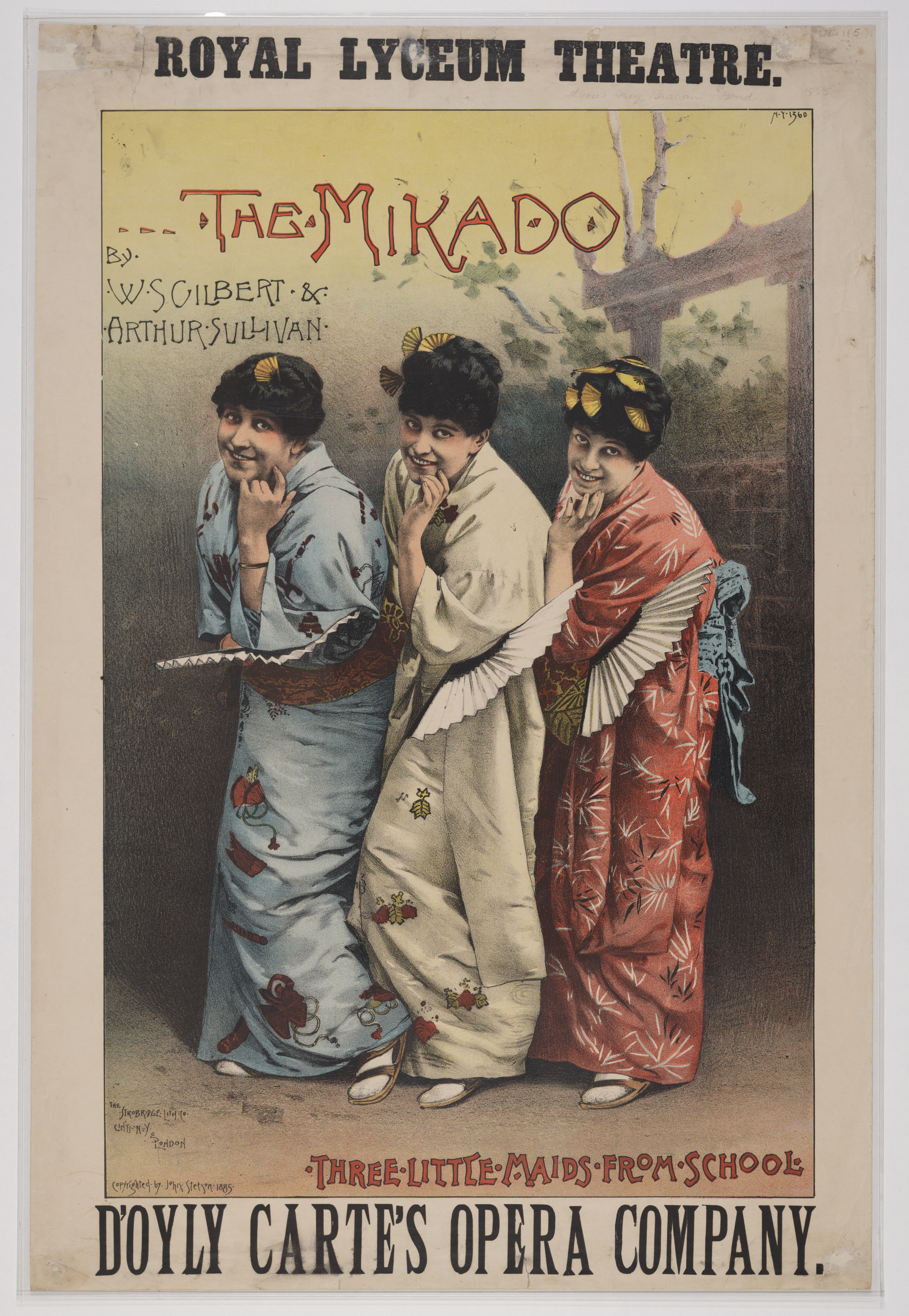
LOOM frequently produced The Mikado

At the end of its tenth year (1978–79), from January to May 1979, LOOM staged all 13 extant works of Gilbert and Sullivan consecutively in a "festival" season, one opera per week (except that Pinafore, Pirates, Mikado and Yeomen were played for two weeks each). It was the first company in the world to attempt this schedule (the D'Oyly Carte Opera Company played all 13 operas consecutively in its 1975 centenary season, but their performance of The Grand Duke was only a concert staging). In the last two of these weeks, Utopia Limited and The Grand Duke, Gilbert and Sullivan's last two G&S operas, were given rare New York professional revivals, although the American Savoyards had performed them two decades earlier, and LOOM had premiered them earlier. Both shows played strongly and were given more extended runs the following season. During "The Festival Year", student tickets were available for $4.00. However, the strain of rehearsing and mounting a new production every week for so many weeks in a row took its toll on the cast.

Enjoying good ticket sales and hoping to ensure its future, LOOM sought to raise funds to purchase the Eastside Playhouse. However, by 1979, diabetes had blinded William Mount-Burke. He nevertheless continued to conduct performances from memory, to plan LOOM's future, and even to stage new shows after losing his sight completely. For example, in 1980 Mount-Burke directed the first professional production of Arthur Sullivan and B. C. Stephenson's The Zoo given anywhere in the world since 1879, together with Cox and Box and Trial by Jury, repeating the triple bill the following year. During these seasons, despite Mount-Burke's declining health, the company attracted high-quality professional singers for their casts, generally improved costumes and sets, earned good reviews and enjoyed a seemingly secure financial future. The New York Times wrote, in its preview of LOOM's 1981 spring season, "The three works (Pinafore, Pirates and The Mikado) ...will be done in the best Savoyard tradition. Do not expect a fully mounted D'Oyly Carte theatrical version.... Expect, however, to hear some fine voices and to be entertained."

This period in the company's history is lampooned in the 2003 comic novel, Jewish Thighs on Broadway: Misadventures of a Little Trouper by Penny Orloff, who played Josephine in Pinafore, Mabel in Pirates, and the title role in Iolanthe in the summer of 1980.

== After Mount-Burke's death ==
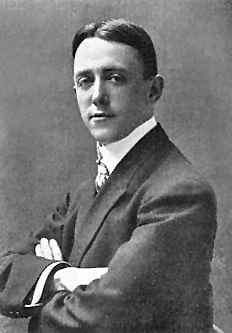
Cohan wrote the songs in LOOM's last premiere, Give My Regards to Broadway

Mount-Burke finally succumbed to his diabetes and died in 1984. Gotham and Allen took over as joint artistic directors to oversee the productions, and assistant music director Todd Ellison was promoted to music director. Jean Dalrymple, a producer of City Center's musical theatre revivals in the 1950s, who had been involved for many years in fundraising for the company, became president of LOOM and produced the shows, which continued uninterrupted, 52 weeks per year. But the company almost immediately ran into a number of misfortunes and costs, perhaps most importantly the loss of the Eastside Playhouse. The building was scheduled to be demolished to make way for an apartment building, and LOOM was forced to leave.

LOOM transferred first to The Norman Thomas High School Auditorium, which was too large for its intimate productions and too distant from the Upper East Side neighborhood where it had built its reputation. Its reduced audiences were dwarfed by the large auditorium. It also had scheduling problems for the company. Next, from February 1985 to October 1986, LOOM performed at the Cherry Lane Theatre in Greenwich Village, but this black box theatre was too small. Although the company's ticket sales improved there, even sellout crowds were insufficient to generate sufficient revenues to stay ahead of the expenses of paying the large casts needed for light opera. Nevertheless, LOOM continued to introduce new productions, including Herbert's Sweethearts and William H. Smith's The Drunkard. Despite constant fundraising, LOOM fell further into debt and ceased performing in October 1986 with a matinee of The Vagabond King. The Eastside Playhouse, as it turned out, was not immediately demolished, and the company briefly returned there in for Babes in Toyland over the 1986–1987 holiday season.

After more fundraising, Jean Dalrymple brought the company back together in 1987, and LOOM resumed its full-time production schedule at the 299-seat Playhouse 91, returning to the Upper East Side. The artistic team created an adaptation of George M. Cohan's Little Johnny Jones, called Give My Regards to Broadway. The show involved more tap dancing than any other show Off-Broadway and revived the company's popularity. Despite good box office performance, the company continued to suffer from debts and old tax problems, and LOOM closed permanently in August 1989, after a run of The Pirates of Penzance – the company's first opera. In 1990 Dalrymple produced, with direction by Gotham, musical direction by Ellison and starring Allen, The Merry Widow, in Westchester, New York, and a weekend of Babes In Toyland at Symphony Space in Manhattan. One or two other brief New York City productions after this used the LOOM name, but they were not by the same company.

Raymond Allen died in January 1994, and Jerry Gotham in July of the same year, ending any possibility of a LOOM revival.
