= The Carp (opera) =

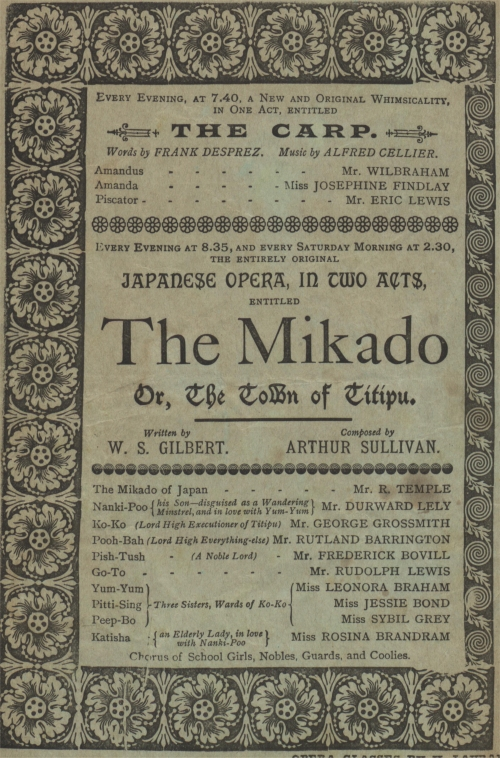
1886 Savoy Theatre programme for The Carp and The Mikado

The Carp is a one-act comic opera (styled "a whimsicality") with a libretto by Frank Desprez and music by Alfred Cellier. It was first produced at the Savoy Theatre from 13 February 1886 to 19 January 1887, as a companion piece to The Mikado. It was then revived as companion to Ruddigore from 21 February 1887 to 5 November 1887. The piece also toured throughout 1888.

No printed libretto or vocal score is found in British Library. A copy of the libretto is in the Lord Chamberlain's collection. As the score is lost, modern amateur productions have played the piece with original music. One such score, composed by Quade Winter, was originally requested in 1998 by the Gilbert and Sullivan Archive for their Web Opera series, and later orchestrated for production by the Ohio Light Opera in 1999. It was revived in 2011 by Concert Operetta Theater of Philadelphia, Pennsylvania.

The fashion in the late Victorian era was to present long evenings in the theatre, and so producer Richard D'Oyly Carte preceded his Savoy operas with curtain raisers such as The Carp. W. J. MacQueen-Pope commented, concerning such curtain raisers:

This was a one-act play, seen only by the early comers. It would play to empty boxes, half-empty upper circle, to a gradually filling stalls and dress circle, but to an attentive, grateful and appreciative pit and gallery. Often these plays were little gems. They deserved much better treatment than they got, but those who saw them delighted in them. ... [They] served to give young actors and actresses a chance to win their spurs ... the stalls and the boxes lost much by missing the curtain-raiser, but to them dinner was more important.

== Synopsis ==
In a charming rural 17th century setting, near a stream and rustic bridge, Piscator arrives, looking forward to a quiet day's fishing. He is interrupted by Amandus, who wants to commit suicide by drowning himself in the river. Piscator, upset, tells Amandus that he has, throughout his life, tried to catch a particular carp at this place. If Amandus throws himself in, he will chase away the carp and spoil a lifetime of work. Amandus, in turn, tells Piscator of his hopeless love affair. He promises to wait until after 6 PM, when Piscator must return home, before drowning himself.

Amanda arrives, and she wants to commit suicide in the river, also over a hopeless love affair. Piscator tells her she must wait, and then goes up the bank, where he has seen the carp nibble at his line. Amanda tells Amandus about her plan to throw herself into the river, but Amandus notes that he has already claimed the pool for that purpose. Amandus's love is Clorinda, Amanda's dearest friend. Amanda then gives Amandus information that casts Clorinda in a bad light. She also shows Amandus that Clorinda has given a very unflattering profile of Amandus in a letter that Clorinda wrote to Amanda.

As the two continue to converse, Amanda finds out that her love, Corydon, is Amandus's best friend. Amandus reveals, however, that Corydon had paid off a gambling debt to Amandus by giving him Amanda's ring. He also relates some rather unflattering things that Corydon had told him about Amanda. Soon, the two are no longer enamoured of their former loves and are now in love with each other. By the time Piscator returns, neither of them wishes to commit suicide any more.

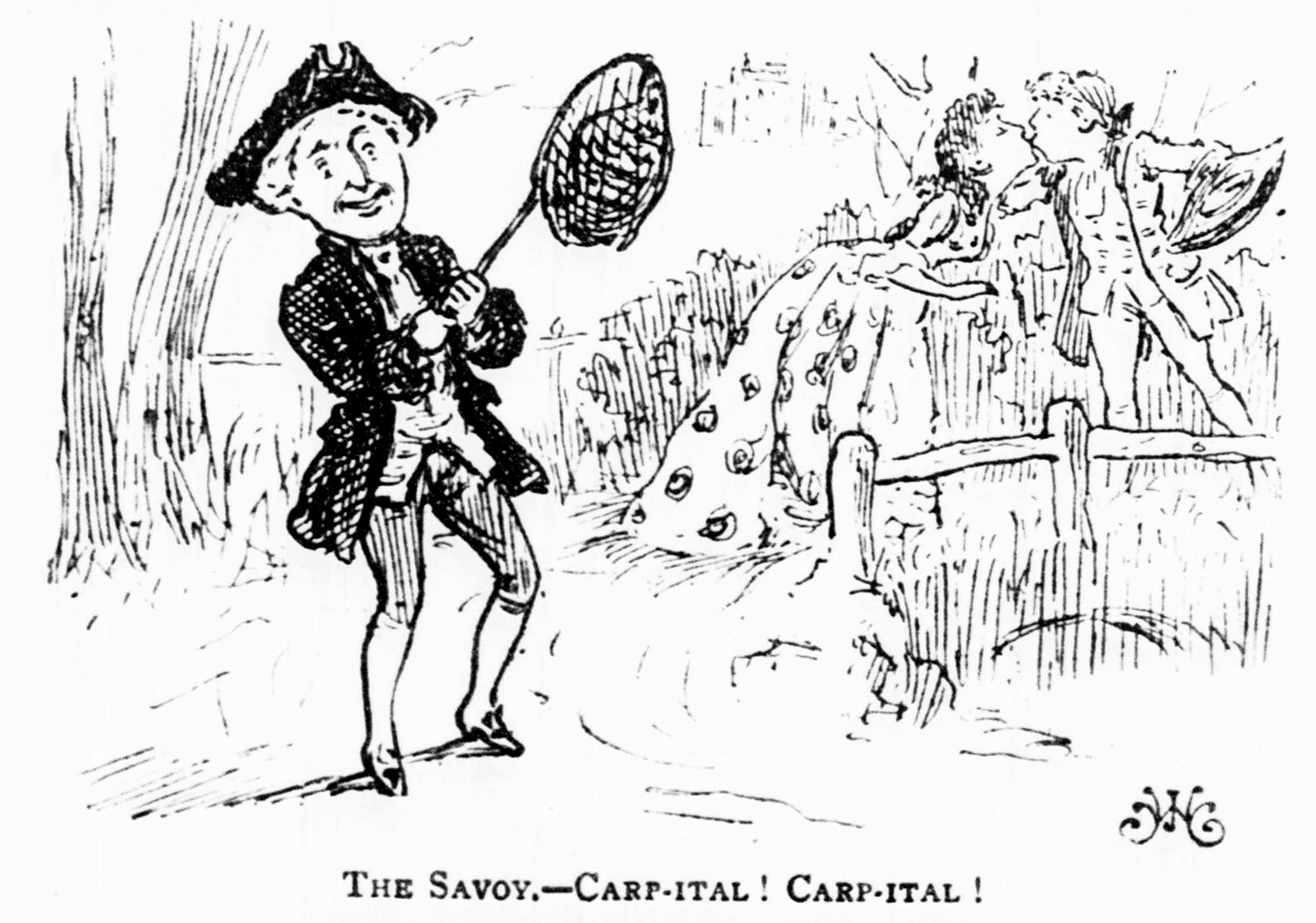
Drawing of The Carp from the magazine Fun

== Musical numbers ==
- No. 1 – The Fisherman, at the Break of Day
- No. 2 – I Loved Her!
- No. 3 – Why does azure deck the sky?
- No. 4 – It's really very hard
- No. 5 – My heart is doubly broken! – Mem'ries
- No. 6 – Finale – Mem'ries

== Cast information ==
The original cast was:

- Amandus (tenor) – Charles Hildesley
- Amanda (soprano) – Josephine Findlay
- Piscator (bass) – Eric Lewis

At the end of July 1886, Amandus was taken over by Charles Wilbraham. In September 1896, Rose Hervey took over the role of Amanda and sometimes shared the part with Miss Lindsay. After The Mikado closed, J. M. Gordon took over the role of Piscator.
