= John Lund (conductor) =

German-born American conductor and composer (1859–1925)

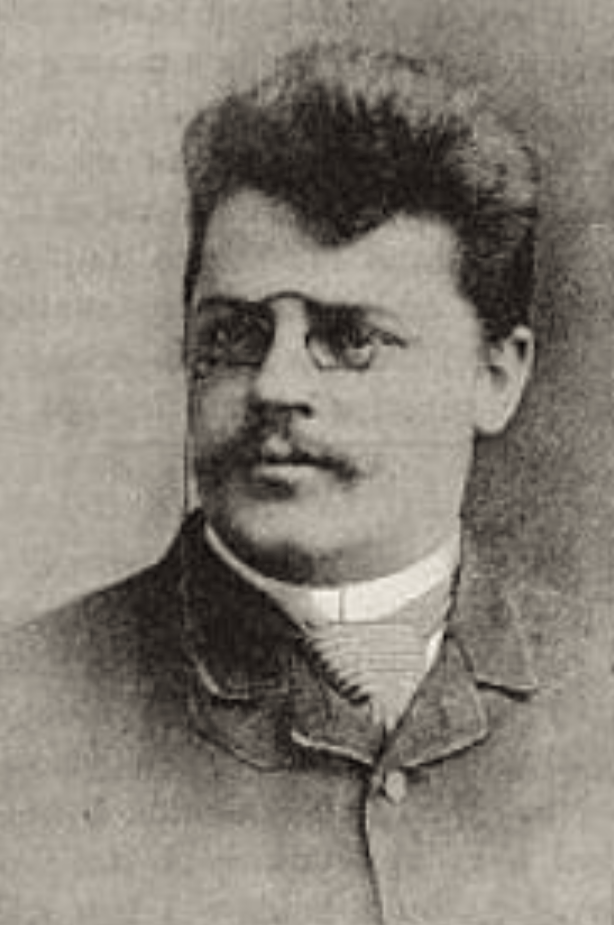
John Lund

John Lund (October 20, 1859 – February 1, 1925) was a German-born American conductor and composer.

== Early life and education in Germany ==
The son of George Ross Lund and his wife Eva Lund (nee Toernstroem), John Reinhold Lund was born in Hamburg, Germany on October 20, 1859. His father was a businessman, and he was educated in his youth at the Johanneum Gymnasium.

His family initially intended him to pursue a career as a lawyer, but a love of music encouraged by his mother drew his passions in that direction. By the time he was seven years of age he was applying himself to piano lessons, and in 1876 he entered the Leipzig Conservatory (now the University of Music and Theatre Leipzig). There he studied music composition and was trained in several instruments; among them oboe, organ, piano, and violin. His teachers included Carl Reinecke, Oscar Paul, Ernst Richter, and Ernst Ferdinand Wenzel. He graduated from the conservatory in 1880. At his commencement his composition Sonata for piano was performed by Karl Muck.

For his first job, Lund was appointed a répétiteur at Theater Bremen in 1880. At that same theatre he was promoted to first chorus master in 1881, and then assistant conductor in 1882. In 1883 he was obtained the post of conductor of the Stettin Stadttheater.

== Career in the United States ==
Lund was hired as an assistant conductor at the Metropolitan Opera ("Met") in New York City for its 1884-1885 season. Leopold Damrosch recruited Lund during his visit to Europe in 1884 with the intent of utilizing Lund as the Met's chorusmaster. Lund made his first appearance at the Met as an accompanist in a concert given at the Metropolitan Opera House on January 25, 1885. Damrosch died unexpectedly the following month and Lund took over his conducting duties. He conducted several operas at the Met in 1885; among them Der Freischütz, Tannhäuser, and La Juive. His final appearance with the Metropolitan Opera was conducting a performance of Die Walküre on tour to Boston on April 16, 1885 with a cast led by Amalie Materna as Brünnhilde, Anton Schott as Siegmund, and Anna Slach as Sieglinde.

In 1885 Lund was appointed conductor of the Thalia Theatre in New York City which was at that time occupied by German opera company.

In 1887 Lund was appointed conductor of the Buffalo Symphony Orchestra (also known as Buffalo Orchestral Association; and no relation to the present orchestra of that name). It was Buffalo's first professional orchestra which he conducted for nine years. Under his tenure he made the orchestra into one of the first mixed-gendered professional symphonies in the United States when he appointed Nora Clench to the violin section in the 1890s. He concurrently served as music director of the Orpheus Men's Choir in Buffalo; remaining as leader of both ensembles through 1903.

While in Buffalo, Lund married his first wife Ida Zeller in 1888. They had one son together. In 1901 he served as conductor of the Pan-American Orchestra; the official orchestra of the Pan-American Exposition.

In 1903 composer Victor Herbert lured Lund away from Buffalo to work for his as a conductor for his operettas. He worked closely with Herbert from 1903-1914; conducting eight of his stage works during that time. The first of these was Babette which premiered at the Broadway Theatre on November 16, 1903 and ran there until January 9, 1904. Other Herbert operettas he conducted on Broadway included Mlle. Modiste (1905-1906) and The Prima Donna (1908-1909).

After his first wife's death, Lund married his second wife, Thekla Carlson, in New York City in 1909. After 1914 he was once again in Buffalo working as conductor of the Orpheus Men's Choir. He was music director of the Delaware Avenue Baptist Church in that city, and continued to work as an orchestra conductor. He resided in a home at 273 Richmond Ave, and was a member of the Buffalo Press Club among other organizations.

As a composer Lund wrote music for both choirs and orchestras. He also wrote art songs, pieces for solo piano, and mixed quartets.

Lund died in Buffalo, New York on February 1, 1925.
