= Mademoiselle Modiste (film) =

1926 film

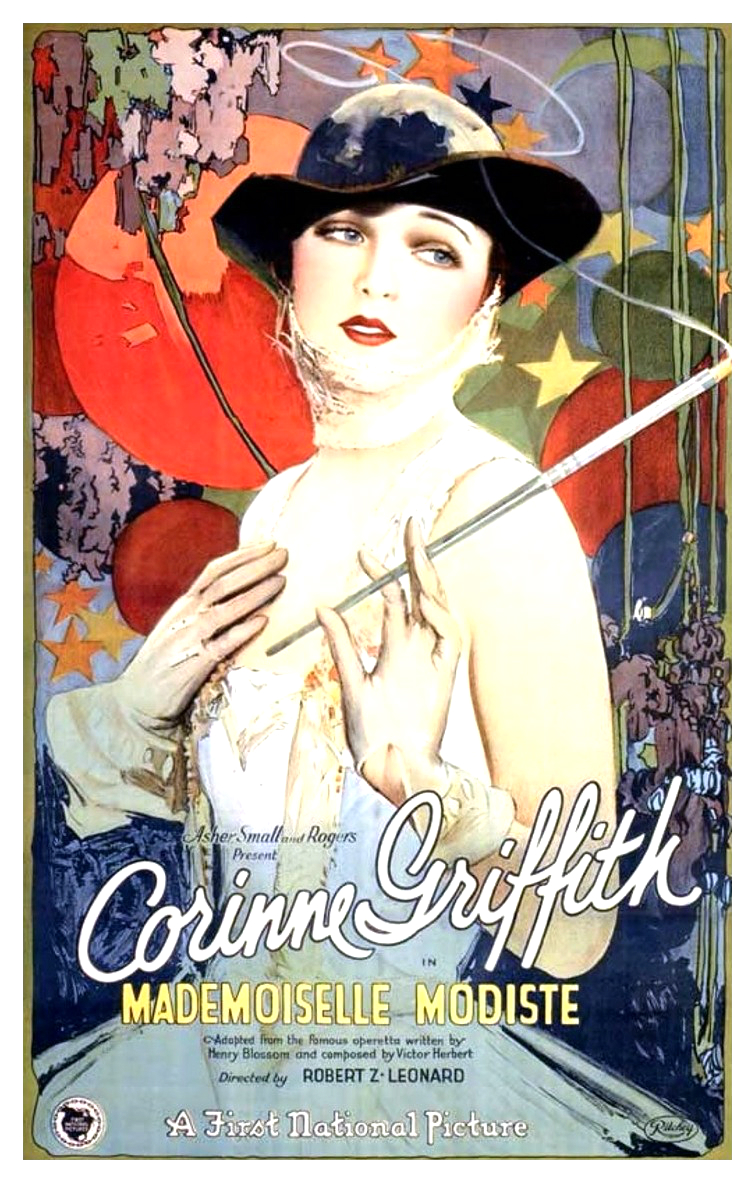
- Film poster
- Directed by: Robert Z. Leonard
- Written by: Adelaide Heilbron (scenario); Ralph Spence (intertitles)
- Based on: Mlle. Modiste by Victor Herbert and Henry Martyn Blossom
- Produced by: Corinne Griffith
- Starring: Corinne Griffith
- Cinematography: George Barnes
- Edited by: Cyril Gardner
- Distributed by: First National Pictures
- Release date: March 21, 1926
- Running time: 70 minutes
- Country: United States
- Language: Silent (English intertitles)

Mademoiselle Modiste is a 1926 American silent romantic comedy film produced by and starring Corinne Griffith and distributed by First National Pictures. Robert Z. Leonard directed Griffith in a story based on a popular 1905 Victor Herbert operetta on Broadway, Mlle. Modiste, with a libretto by Henry Martyn Blossom, which was similar to the MGM film The Merry Widow. It is now considered a lost film.

The story was refilmed in 1931 as the talkie Kiss Me Again.

== Plot ==
As described in a film magazine, Hiram Bent, impressed with the sales ability of Fifi, opens a fashionable establishment, and exploits her beauty and capabilities to advantage. Cavalry officer Etienne, her fiancé, is shocked by the seeming lack of modesty of Fifi, who is now known as Mademoiselle Modiste, becomes disillusioned and leaves her. Disheartened, Fifi asks Hiram to take her to Deauville, where she meets Etienne. Enraged with jealousy, Etienne challenges Hiram to a duel. Fifi says that Hiram is her husband, but the truth is later revealed. Etienne proposes and Fifi accepts.

== Cast ==
- Corinne Griffith as Fifi
- Norman Kerry as Etienne
- Willard Louis as Hiram Bent
- Dorothy Cumming as Marianne
- Rose Dione as Madame Claire
- Peggy Blake (Undetermined Role)
