= The Prima Donna =

Comic opera by Victor Herbert and Henry Blossom

The Prima Donna is a comic opera in two acts with music by Victor Herbert and a libretto by Henry Blossom. Written as a starring vehicle for Fritzi Scheff, the work premiered at the Studebaker Theater in Chicago on October 5, 1908. The production moved to Broadway where it had its New York City debut at the Knickerbocker Theatre on November 30, 1908. It ran at that theatre for total of 72 performances; closing on January 30, 1909. The original production was produced by Charles Dillingham, staged by Fred G. Latham, and conducted by musical director John Lund. The sets were designed by Homer Emens, and the costumes were created by Elsie de Wolfe. The leading cast included Fritzi Scheff as Mlle. Athenee, a.k.a. "The Prima Donna"; Donald Hall as her love interest, Lieutenant Fernand Drouillard; William K. Harcourt as Athenee's thwarted suitor, Captain Bordenave; James E. Sullivan as the French music hall impresario, Herr Max Gundelfinger; and W. J. Ferguson as Athenee's father, Monsieur Beaurivage.
