= The Streets of New York (In Old New York) =

Song composed by Victor Herbert

Single by Billy Murray

from the album The Red Mill
- A-side: "Let It Alone"
- Published: 1906
- Released: January 1907
- Genre: Show tune
- Label: Columbia
- Composer: Victor Herbert
- Lyricist: Henry Blossom

"The Streets of New York" is a song originally published by M. Witmark & Sons. The song was from the musical comedy The Red Mill. The song was composed by Victor Herbert and typically plays at the end of Act II in The Red Mill.

== History ==
Cover of the song's sheet music from The Red Mill

The song was composed by Victor Herbert to lyrics by Henry Blossom for The Red Mill in 1906.

The melody inspired the Oklahoma State University fight song, “Ride em’ Cowboys”, which was first published in by John K. Hall in 1923. The song is typically played by the Oklahoma State University Cowboy Marching Band during games.

== Lyrics ==
(Verse 1)

In dear old New York it's remarkable very!
The name on the lamp-post is unnecessary!
You merely have to see the girls
To know what street you're on!
Fifth Avenue beauties and dear old Broadway girls!
The tailor made shoppers the Avenue A girls,
They're strictly all right but they're different quite
In the diff'rent parts of town.

(Refrain)

In Old New York! In old New York!
The peach crop's always fine!
They're sweet and fair and on the square!
The maids of Manhattan for mine!
You cannot see in gay Paree,
In London or in Cork!
The queens you'll meet on any street
In old New York!

(Verse 2)

If a spare afternoon you should happen to have and you
Start on a leisurely stroll up Fifth Avenue,
There is where with haughty air
You'll see them as they walk!
With velvets and laces and sable enfolding them,
Really you'll nearly fall dead on beholding them,
Lucky's the earl that can marry a girl
From Fifth Avenue New York.

(Repeat refrain)

In Old New York! In old New York!
The peach crop's always fine!
They're sweet and fair and on the square!
The maids of Manhattan for mine!
You cannot see in gay Paree,
In London or in Cork!
The queens you'll meet on any street
In old New York!

(Verse 3)
Whatever the weather is shining or showery,
That doesn't cut any ice on the Bowery.
Ev'ry night till broad daylight,
They dance and sing and talk!
The girls are all game and they're jolly good fellows,
They're not very swell but they're none of them jealous,
They go it alone in a style of their own
On the Bowery in New York.
