= Kiss Me Again (1931 film) =

1931 film directed by William A. Seiter

- Lantern slide
- Directed by: William A. Seiter
- Written by: Julien Josephson; Paul Perez
- Based on: Mlle. Modiste; 1905 operetta by Victor Herbert; Henry Martyn Blossom
- Starring: Bernice Claire; Walter Pidgeon; Edward Everett Horton; Frank McHugh; June Collyer
- Cinematography: Lee Garmes; Alfred Gilks (Technicolor)
- Edited by: Alexander Hall
- Music by: Victor Herbert
- Color process: Technicolor
- Production company: First National Pictures
- Distributed by: Warner Bros. Pictures
- Release date: February 21, 1931
- Running time: 76 minutes
- Country: United States
- Language: English

Kiss Me Again is a 1931 American pre-Code musical operetta film filmed entirely in Technicolor. It was originally released in the United States as Toast of the Legion late in 1930, but was quickly withdrawn when Warner Bros. Pictures realized that the public had grown weary of musicals. The Warner Bros. believed that this attitude would only last for a few months, but, when the public proved obstinate, they reluctantly re-released the film early in 1931 after making a few cuts to the film.

Like the 1926 silent First National film Mademoiselle Modiste, Kiss Me Again is based on a popular 1905 operetta on Broadway, Mlle. Modiste, by Victor Herbert and Henry Martyn Blossom.

== Plot ==
A French shopgirl obeys her parents by leaving her lover to become an opera star.

== Cast ==
- Bernice Claire as Mademoiselle Fifi
- Edward Everett Horton as Rene
- Walter Pidgeon as Paul de St. Cyr
- June Collyer as Marie
- Frank McHugh as Francois
- Claude Gillingwater as Count de St. Cyr
- Judith Vosselli as Mademoiselle Cecile
- Albert Gran as General de Villafranche

== Music ==
When the film was re-released in 1931, most of Walter Pidgeon's songs were cut from the film. Only a small abbreviated version of one of his songs is heard on the existing print.

== Songs ==
- Ah! But in Dreams So Fair
- Alas! To Part, How Great the Sorrow
- I Want What I Want When I Want It
- If I Were On the Stage
- Kiss Me Again
- The Mascot of the Troop
- Clothes Parade
- A Make Believe Ladies Man
- Pan Americana
- Ballet Medley
- Air de Ballet
- The Time, the Place and the Girl

== Preservation ==
Only a black-and-white copy of the cut print released in 1931 in the United States seems to have survived. The complete film was released intact in countries outside the United States under the title of Toast of the Legion where a backlash against musicals never occurred. It is unknown whether a copy of this full version still exists.

== See also ==
- List of early color feature films
