= James Stuart (opera director) =

American opera singer

James F. Stuart (23 December 1928, in Baton Rouge, Louisiana – 7 March 2005) was an American opera director and operatic tenor. He began his career performing and touring with Dorothy Raedler’s American Savoyards. He became a specialist in the patter roles of Gilbert and Sullivan, including Sir Joseph Porter, K.C.B. in H.M.S. Pinafore, Ko-Ko in The Mikado, and Reginald Bunthorne in Patience among others. In 1979 he founded the Ohio Light Opera in Wooster, Ohio, serving as the company's artistic director for two decades. During his tenure there he also often worked as producer, stage director, translator, and performer. He himself performed in fifty of the more than two hundred productions mounted by the company while he was director. He also sang on twenty of the company's live operetta recordings, which encompassed works by both Americans and Europeans.
