= Ida Hawley =

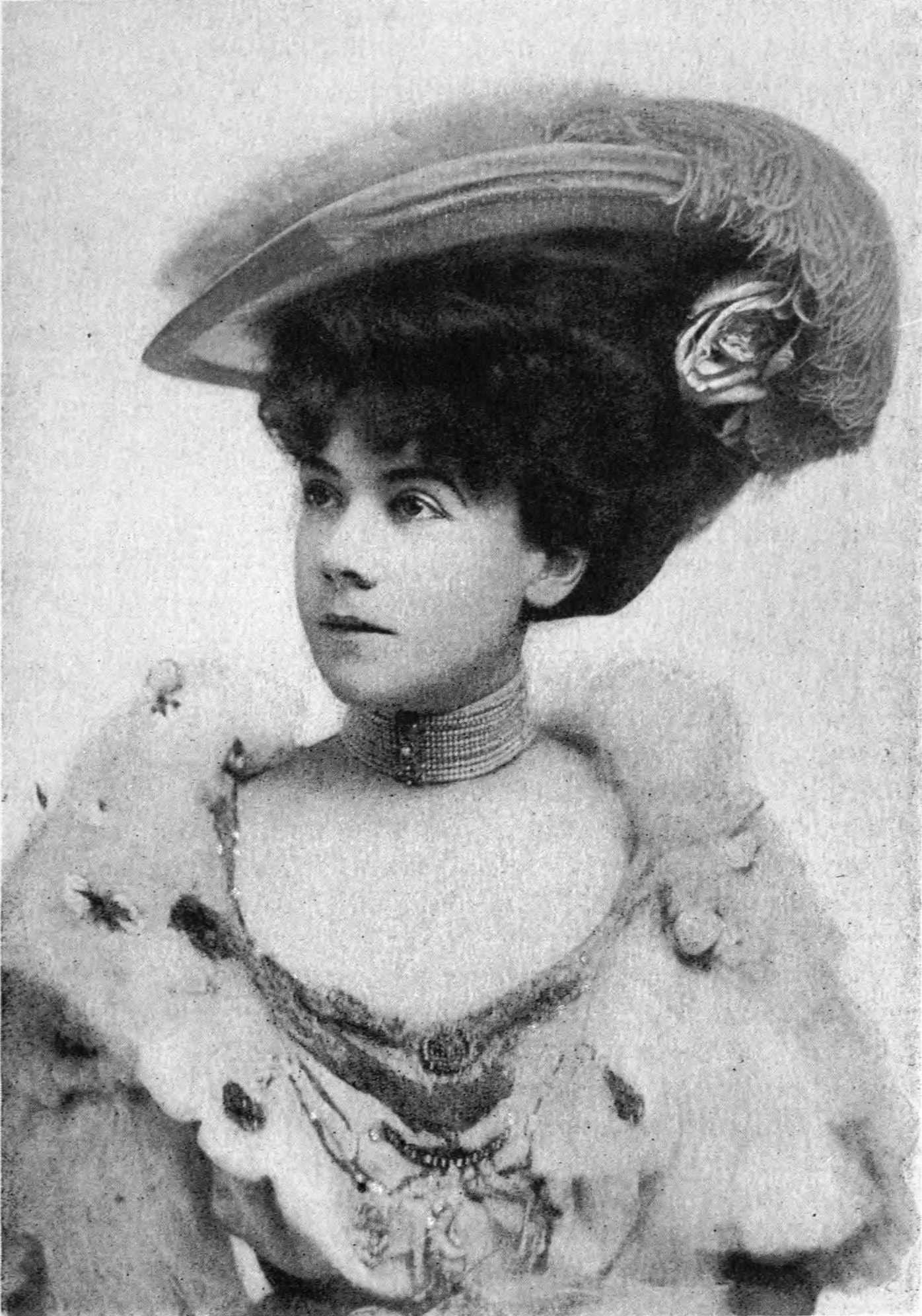
- Born: April 26, 1876; Belleville, Ontario, Canada
- Died: December 9, 1908 (aged 32); New York City
- Occupation: Actress
- Writing career
- Years active: 1897-1908

Ida Hawley (April 26, 1876 – December 9, 1908) was a musical comedy actress and soprano singer from Canada who worked in the U.S.

== Early life ==
Ida Hawley was born at Belleville, Ontario in 1876 and later raised in Toronto, where she received her higher education at the Loretto Abbey Catholic Secondary School

Little is known about her life, other than that when she was not working in the U.S. she maintained a residence at the Hotel Flanders in Toronto and that she left behind a legacy of work from a career that extended barely past a decade.

== Career ==
Her professional career began in 1897 as a stock actress with Augustin Daly's company, performing Shakespeare’s The Tempest in Philadelphia and later Boston. After a season of repertoire work Hawley left Daly to play Yvonne in Alexandre Dumas' Paul Jones at the Schiller Theatre in Chicago, followed by a part in A Runaway Girl at the Chestnut Street Theatre in Philadelphia.

The next season she worked on the musical comedy Three Little Lambs (by R.A. Barnett and composer E.W. Corliss) which premiered at New York's Fifth Avenue Theatre on Christmas Day, 1899. The following year she appeared in the musical extravaganza A Million Dollars by Louis Harrison and George V. Hobart, that opened to unfavourable reviews on September 27, 1900.

Hawley had better luck as Ruth in the successful run of The Burgomaster, a musical comedy written by Gustav Luders and composed by Frank Pixley. The critics praised her performance as Princess Soo-Soo in A Chinese Honeymoon by George Dance (dramatist) and composer Howard Talbot. A few months later she assumed the role of Edith in another Luders and Pixley musical comedy, The Prince of Pilsen, during its long run at the Broadway Theatre.

Later in 1903 Hawley began working as an understudy for opera singer Fritzi Scheff on her national tour with the comic operettas Babette, by Victor Herbert and Harry B. Smith and Two Roses, based on Oliver Goldsmith’s She Stoops to Conquer. In May 1904 Hawley stepped in to replace Scheff for the remainder of the season after a severe sore throat forced the actress to withdraw from the tour.

In August 1905, Hawley played Polly Premier at the Broadway Theatre in The Pearl and the Pumpkin, written by Paul West and composer John W. Bratton. In 1906 she toured in an off-Broadway production of The Blue Moon by Howard Talbot and Paul Rubens and the following year she played the lead role in Gustav Kerker and George Broadhurst's The Lady from Lane's, a musical comedy that ran for 47 performances at the Casino Theatre.

== Death ==
Ida Hawley died on December 9, 1908, aged 32, at Alston's Sanitarium on West 61st Street in Manhattan from complications following an operation for appendicitis. Her remains were sent back to Toronto where her father still resided.
