= Babette (musical) =

Operetta by Victor Herbert

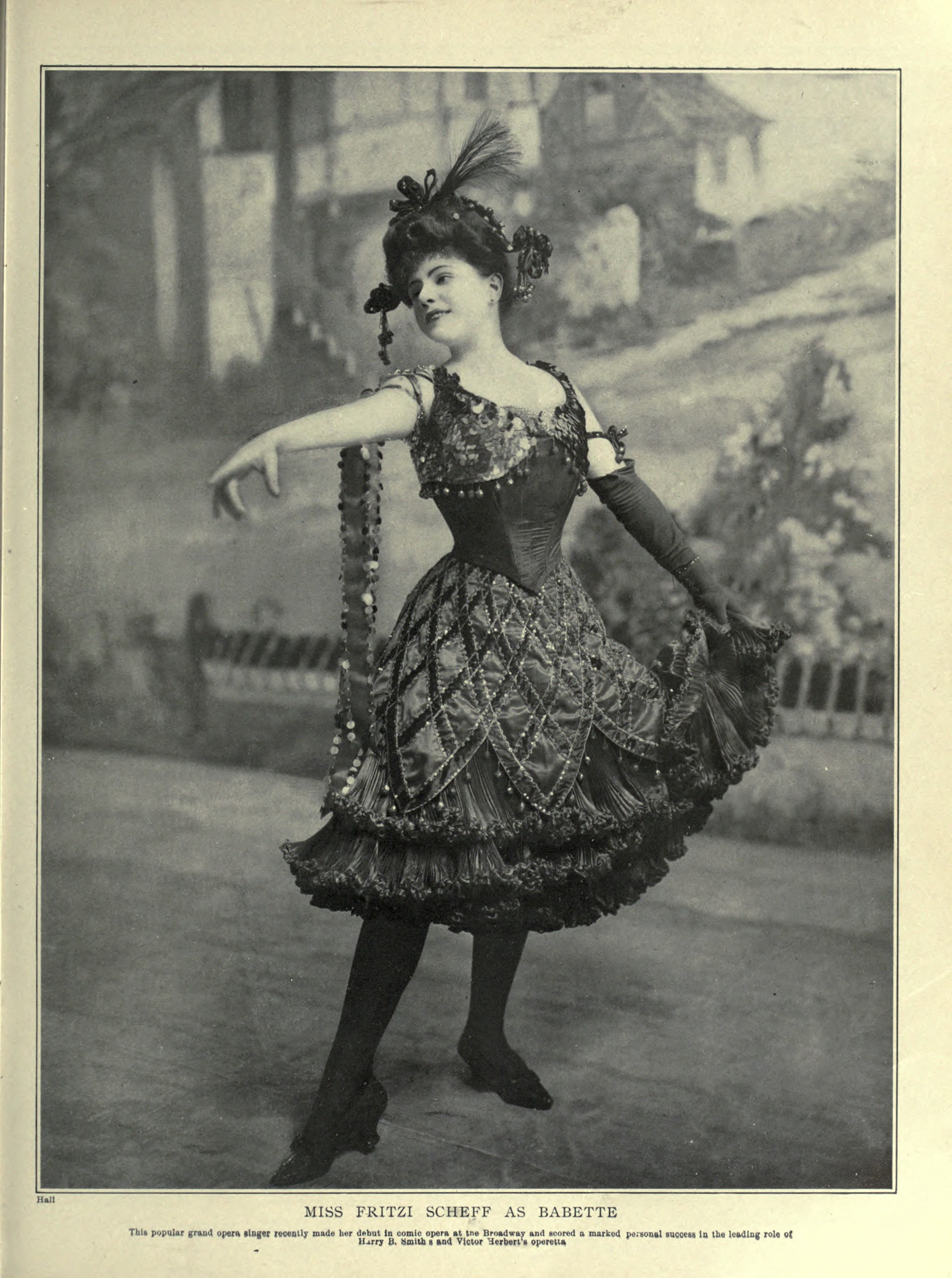
Fritzi Scheff in the title role (1904)

Babette is an operetta with music by Victor Herbert and a libretto by Harry B. Smith, which premiered on Broadway in 1903.

== Productions ==
The original production opened at the Broadway Theatre on November 16, 1903, and closed on January 9, 1904, after 59 performances. Frederick G. Latham directed, and John Lund was the music director. The New York Times's reviewer stated of Fritzi Scheff in the title role: "As a comic opera singer she is one of the most brilliant figures that has appeared in New York for a long time; her voice never sounded so fresh and strong, her personality never seemed so dominating and full of vitality. ... The story is cumbersome, confused and ... free from comic spirit [or] wit. ... Herbert ... has written a charming score" and praised the rest of the company and the "handome" production.

In 1976 Bel Canto Opera staged an off-Broadway revival of the show, which opened on May 21 and ran for four performances.

== Synopsis ==
In the 17th century, when Spain ruled Belgium, Babette, the letter-writer of a small Flemish village, foils a traitorous conspiracy to help the Spanish obtain the assistance of the King of France. Babette deceives the conspirators, inducing them to pose as strolling players, then she and a group of Flemish patriots change places with them. She then contrives to get the conspirators arrested by the Spanish, appropriating their coach and horses. The patriots travel to Versailles and seek help from the king in their efforts to gain freedom from the Spanish.

== Songs ==
=== Act l ===
- Opening Chorus (Ensemble)
- My Honor and My Sword (Mondragon and Chorus)
- On the Other Side of The Wall (Mondragon and Vinetta)
- Entrance of Babette (Ensemble)
- Letter I Write all day (Letter-writing Song) (Babette)
- He Who’d Thrive (Clockmaker’s Song) (Van Tympel and Chorus)
- I’ll Bribe the Stars (Picture Painting Song) (Babette and Marcel)
- Finale I (Ensemble)

=== Act ll ===
- Opening Chorus Act II (Ensemble)
- Tony the Peddler (Mondragon and Chorus)
- Hear the Coachman Crack His Whip (Ensemble)
- We're Very Highly Polished at the Court (Baltazar and Vinetta)
- To the Sound of the Pipe and the Roll of the Drum (Babette, Vinetta, Eva and Chorus)
- On The Stage (Van Tymple)
- Be Kind to poor Pierrot (Babette)
- There once was an owl (Marcel, Vinetta, Eva, Mondragon, Katrina, Theresa)
- My Lady ‘Tis For Thee (Marcel)
- The Life of a Bold Free Lance (Captain Guzman and Chorus)
- Finale II (Ensemble)

=== Act lll ===
- Opening Chorus Act III (Ensemble)
- It’s A way we have in Spain (Van Tromp, Eva, Mondragon, Marcel and Chorus)
- My Lady of the Manor (Vinette, Eva, Marcel and Mondragon)
- Where the Fairest Flow’rs (Butterfly Waltz) (Babette)
- Finale III (Ensemble)

== Original cast ==
Character	Actor
Babette	Fritzi Scheff
Mondragon	Eugene Cowles
Eva	Josephine Bartlett
Katrina	Florence Belleville
Vinette	Ida Hawley
Marcel	Richie Ling
Van Tympel	Louis Harrison
Baltazar	Edward J. Connelly
Laurent	Gertrude Adams
Count de Courville	Arthur Blanchard
Jan	Frank Boyle
Henri	Rita Dean
The King of France	Erroll Dunbar
Margot	Rosa Earle
Captain Waither	Alfred S. Ely
Mlle. de Fontanges	Mildred Forest
Greta	Edna Luby
Teresa	Emily Montague
Joan	Adele Nott
Gaston	Helen Planchet
Jacque	Aline Redmond
Mlle. de Rohan	May Seeley
Schnapps	William Sissons
Guzman	Madison Smith
Coachman	J. T. Chaillee
A Court Lady	Mary Smith
Footman	Charles Emerson
Duc de St. Michel	Henry Wilkinson
Marquis de Villette	George Williamson
Mlle. de la Motte	Bertha Willoughby

== Reception ==
The 1903 production received positive reviews for Scheff in the lead role and Herbert's music, but generally negative reviews for the show's book.
