= Sweethearts (musical) =

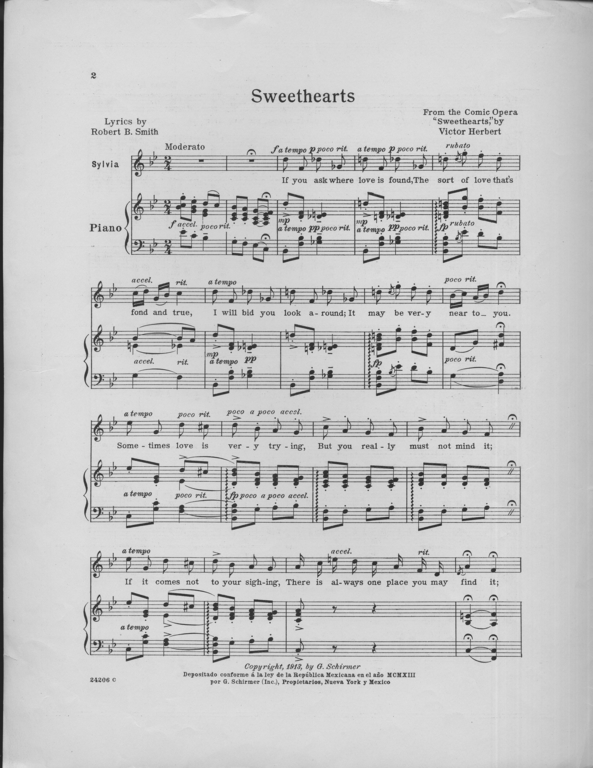
- Sheet music for the title song
- Music: Victor Herbert
- Lyrics: Robert B. Smith
- Book: Harry B. Smith; Fred de Gresac
- Productions: 1913 Broadway; 1929 Broadway Revival; 1938 film 1947 Broadway Revival

Sweethearts is an operetta or musical play in two acts with music by Victor Herbert, lyrics by Robert B. Smith and book by Harry B. Smith and Fred de Gresac.

== Productions ==
The first performance of the work was at the Academy of Music in Baltimore in March 1913, after which the show was overhauled and shortened before spending five weeks in Philadelphia and another five in Boston tryouts. The original Broadway production opened at the New Amsterdam Theatre on September 8, 1913, and transferred to the Liberty Theatre on November 10, 1913, running for a total of 136 performances. The original cast included Christie MacDonald as Princess Jeanne/Sylvia, Thomas Conkey as Prince Franz, Edwin Wilson as Lieutenant Karl, Frank Belcher as Petrus Von Tromp, Tom McNaughton as Mikel Mikeloviz, Ethel Du Fre Houston as Dame Paula, and Hazel Kirk as Liane.

There was a brief revival at Jolson's 59th Street Theatre, opening on September 21, 1929, and closing on October 5, 1929. Gladys Baxter played Sylvia. MGM made the musical into a film in 1938 with a screenplay considerably altered from the musical's book, directed by W. S. Van Dyke and starring Jeanette MacDonald and Nelson Eddy. This was the first all-Technicolor film of MGM Studio.

A Broadway revival opened at the Shubert Theater on January 21, 1947, and ran for 288 performances. It featured a revised book by John Cecil Holm and musical direction by Robert Russell Bennett. The cast included Bobby Clark as Mikel, Marjorie Gateson as Dame Lucy, Gloria Story as Princess Sylvia and June Knight as Liane.

The piece was presented in the 1980s by the Light Opera of Manhattan. In 2002 the Ohio Light Opera commissioned a new critical edition of the operetta from Quade Winter, based on the composer's original manuscripts in the Library of Congress. A complete recording was issued by Albany Records.

== Synopsis ==
Mikel Mikeloviz, disguised as a monk, transports Princess Jeanne, the infant daughter of King René of the little kingdom of Zilinia, to Bruges to wait in safety during the war. Dame Paula runs the Laundry of the White Geese and is known as Mother Goose. Mikel gives the princess to Paula in secret to raise as her own daughter under the name of Sylvia. Paula later has six daughters of her own who help her run the laundry. Their father has been at war for ten years.

22 years later, the people are demanding the restoration of a monarchy. Mikel is conspiring to restore Princess Jeanne to the throne, which is about to be offered to Prince Franz, the heir presumptive. Franz, while travelling in disguise, has fallen in love with Sylvia. But Sylvia, who does not know that she is really a princess, is bethrothed to Lieutenant Karl, a military lothario. A sleazy politician, disguised as Paula's battle-scarred husband, tries to ensnare one of the two apparently adopted daughters as the bride for Prince Franz, but he does not know whether the real adopted daughter is the scheming Liane or the sweet Sylvia. Mikel's plans are hindered by the schemes of three villains. Mikel also mistakes Liane, a milliner who has sought temporary employment in the Laundry of the White Geese, for the lost princess. After all the complications are combed out, Franz and Sylvia marry, vowing to rule together.

== Recording ==
RCA Victor issued an album using studio singers and Al Goodman's orchestra on 78-RPM records in 1947. These highlights were re-issued, on LP, by RCA Victor in 1951 and on their budget label RCA Camden in 1958. A 2008 CD release combines these recordings with selections from Naughty Marietta and The Red Mill.

== Songs ==
Act 1

- Iron, Iron, Iron - Chorus
- On Parade - Ensemble
- Smiles - Liane and Ensemble
- Sweethearts (If You Ask Where Love Is Found) - Sylvia
- For Every Lover Must Meet His Fate - Prince Franz and Ensemble
- Mother Goose - Sylvia and Ensemble
- The Angelus - Sylvia and Prince Franz
- Jeanette and Her Little Wooden Shoes (Sabot Dance) (Clip Clop Clop) - Liane, Hon. Percy *Algernon Slingsby, Aristide Caniche and Baron Petrus Von Tromp

Act 2

- Waiting for the Bride - Male Chorus
- Pretty As a Picture - Von Tromp and Male Chorus
- In the Convent They Never Taught Me That - Sylvia and Ensemble
- Game Of Love - Lt. Karl and Daughters
- I Don't Know How I Do It But I Do (Lyrics By Harry B. Smith) - Slingsby
- Cricket on the Hearth - Sylvia and Prince Franz
- The Monks' Quartette - Mikel Mikeloviz, Von Tromp, Slingsby and Aristide Caniche

== Roles ==
- Dame Paula (Mezzo-soprano) - Owner of the White Geese Laundry
- Karl (Tenor) - A Lieutenant in the local military
- Liane (Soprano) - A hat shop girl masquerading as one of Paula's daughters
- Mikel (Tenor) - A diplomat from Zenovia
- Sylvia (Coloratura Soprano) - An adopted daughter of Dame Paula
- Franz (Baritone) - Prince of Zenovia
- Van Tromp (Baritone) - A diplomat from Germany
- Slingsby (Baritone) - A diplomat from France
- Chorus
