= American Savoyards =

Former light opera company in New York City

Program cover for the American Savoyards' summer seasons in Monmouth, Maine

American Savoyards was an Off-Broadway and touring repertory theatre company that produced light operas, principally the works of Gilbert and Sullivan, in New York City and on tour between 1948 and 1967.

== Beginnings ==
In 1948, director Dorothy Raedler started a professional Gilbert and Sullivan repertory company, The Masque and Lyre Light Opera Company, named after an amateur theatre group that she had founded in 1939 in college and directed under that name. They opened on Long Island with four different G&S shows, moving to New York City in 1949. The company stayed in New York City for three and half years, performing ten of the Savoy Operas plus Cox and Box.

== 1950s and touring ==
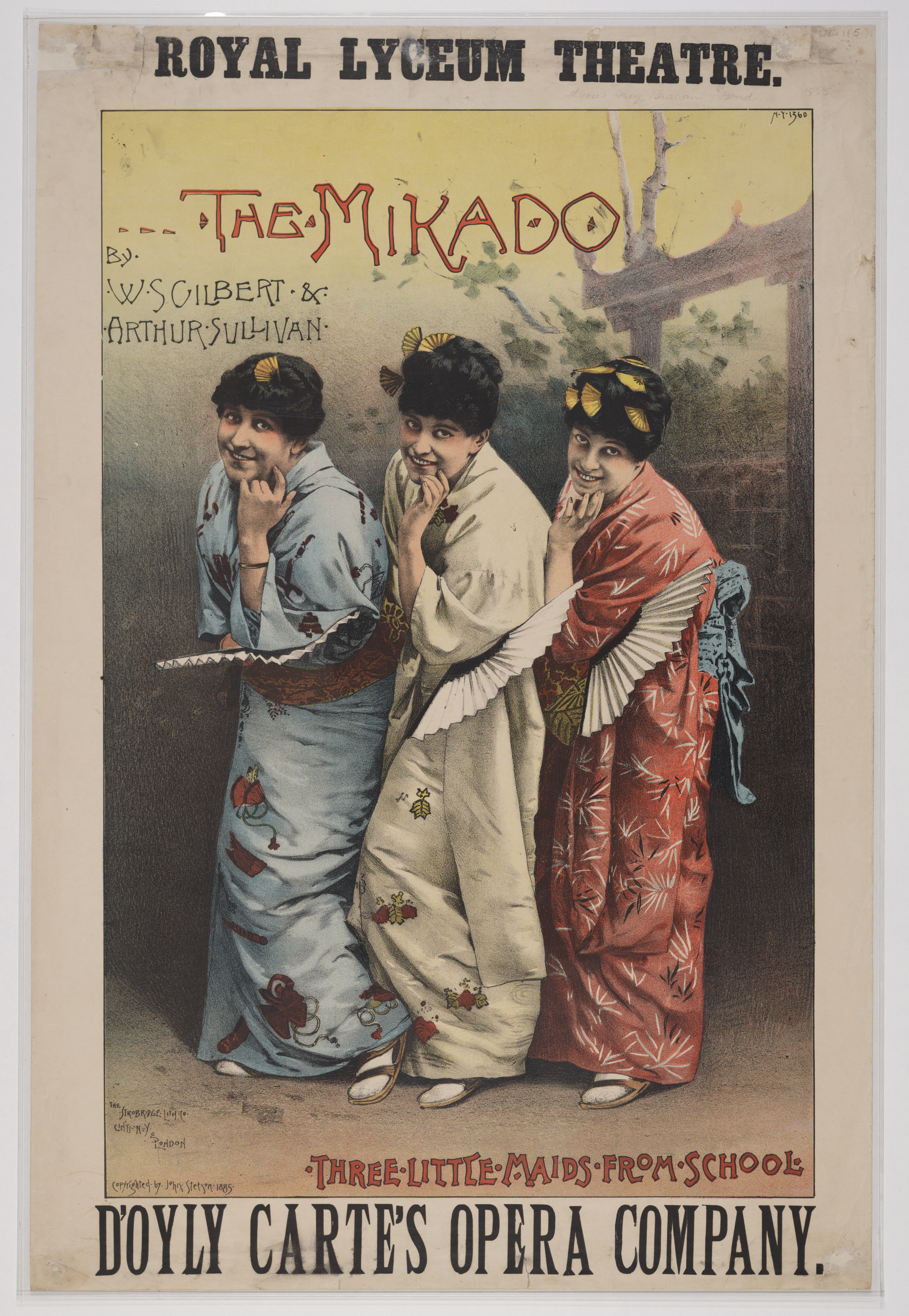
The company frequently produced The Mikado

Raedler planned to take the company on tour in 1952. She traveled to England in June 1952 with her leading comic baritone and leading soprano, Rue and Sally Knapp, to research W.S. Gilbert's staging, choreography, costumes, properties and other aspects of the original Gilbert and Sullivan productions. She intended her productions to follow the performance "traditions" of the D'Oyly Carte Opera Company, and she replicated "authentic" costumes as closely as possible. Raedler's intentions, as stated in the company's program notes, were to avoid "pork pie" gags or cheap laughs, to stay true to Gilbert's stylistic intentions and to give each member of her company intensive training in the art. Raedler also decided that her company would use American stage diction, rather than British, and attractive actors, to cater to her audiences. Like Gilbert, Raedler was known as a hard taskmaster in rehearsals and an exacting director.

For this first tour, Raedler renamed the company American Savoyards. The first shows on tour were The Mikado and Patience. Early tours included U.S. states from Florida to Maine. Subsequent tours included places as far away as California and Canada. Each winter, the company returned to New York City, often performing at the Jan Hus Playhouse on East 74th Street, the downstairs room in a church. The group claimed to be the only professional theatre company performing the full G&S repertoire, as the D'Oyly Carte had retired several productions.

In 1953, the American Savoyards performed for ten weeks over the summer in Cumston Hall, a Victorian theater in Monmouth, Maine. They returned each summer for seven years to Monmouth, generally for ten-week seasons. Their format was eight performances of a different G&S show each week (6 evenings, 2 matinees, no Sunday performances). In 1956, Ronald Bush, the company's principal bass-baritone, gave up his on-stage roles to become its music director. The same year, Company first performed Utopia Limited, probably the first professional performances of this work in North America since 1894. In 1957, Raymond Allen took over the comic leads when the Knapps left the company. In 1958, the company added three non-G&S operettas, and in 1959 they added The Grand Duke, in its North American professional premiere. That summer, the company performed four other G&S shows and five non-G&S shows in Monmouth. It was the company's last summer in Maine.

== 1960s ==
Allen as Sir Joseph in H.M.S. Pinafore

The company continued performing in New York (including at the Jan Hus, Shakespearewrights Theatre, Greenwich Mews, Actor's Playhouse, Brooklyn Academy of Music and other venues) and toured elsewhere in the United States. By 1965, the company was having financial difficulties, and Raedler was ultimately unable to hold it together. Its final performance was on December 31, 1967, at the Jan Hus theatre. Not long after the company closed, a new professional Gilbert and Sullivan company grew up in residence at the Jan Hus, the Light Opera of Manhattan (LOOM). The American Savoyards' then principal comic, Raymond Allen, joined LOOM, and Raedler sold many of the company's costumes and stage properties to the new company.

== Production details ==
The company's accompaniment consisted of a piano and Hammond organ, although occasionally it performed with the full Sullivan orchestra on tour. Musical director Ronald Bush generally conducted from the organ. All of the productions were directed and choreographed by Raedler. The principal actors were mostly members of Actors' Equity Association, and the company often used young local talent in the chorus. The company performed long seasons.

The actors included Sally Knapp (later a Broadway and television commercial actress) as the company's first principal soprano, and her brother, Rue Knapp, in the comic baritone roles. Ronald Bush sang the bass-baritone roles with the company until the mid-1950s, when he became musical director. Other company members included Charles Nelson Reilly, Dominic Chianese (later "Uncle Junior" in The Sopranos), Bill Tost (later the long-time "Bellomy" in The Fantasticks); Bob Randall (the novelist, who wrote the comedy, 6 Rms Riv Vu), Ellen Shade and Robert Schmorr (opera singers who later appeared at the Metropolitan Opera), Arthur Mathews (who later appeared on Broadway), opera singer and director Don Yule, James Stuart (who founded the Ohio Light Opera), Allan Lokos (Broadway actor and now a minister). Raymond Allen, later with LOOM and New York City Opera, began with tenor roles and replaced Knapp in the comic "patter" roles in 1957.

== Dorothy Raedler ==
Dorothy Raedler was born February 24, 1917, in New York City. She attended Hunter College. In addition to her Gilbert and Sullivan companies, she directed non-G&S operas in various venues, including several at New York City Opera, Baltimore Civic Opera Company and elsewhere from the 1960s. The New York Times wrote: "Plácido Domingo, a new tenor, was Pinkerton. ... Dorothy Raedler's direction and Franco Patane's authoritative conducting were major factors in a presentation that offered nothing but pleasure." Raedler also directed Gilbert and Sullivan productions for City Opera and for the City Center Gilbert & Sullivan Company, which had casts including such Metropolitan Opera singers as Nico Castel, Muriel Costa-Greenspon, Robert Hale, Ellen Shade, and Frank Poretta, Sr., as well as Broadway actors Nancy Dussault, Barbara Meister, Ruth Kobart, and Raymond Allen.

Raedler also brought several of the former principal actors from American Savoyards, including John Carle, Bill Tost, James Wilson, Sandra Darling, and Ruth Ray (calling them "The Five Savoyards"), to New York City and Connecticut public schools to perform Gilbert and Sullivan excerpts for the children. She served on the board of directors of the Harlem School of the Arts.

Raedler retired to St. Croix VI in the Virgin Islands in 1968, where she helped to found the St. Croix School of the Arts, a program for children. She died of cancer on December 11, 1993.
