= Robert Bache Smith =

American librettist and lyricist (1875–1951)

Robert Bache Smith ( June 4, 1875 – November 6, 1951) was an American librettist and lyricist. His older brother, Harry B. Smith, was also a successful lyricist and a writer and composer.

Born in Chicago, Smith began his career apprenticing with the famed vaudeville duo Weber and Fields at the Weber and Fields' Broadway Music Hall. He most notably wrote the lyrics to “Come Down, Ma Evenin' Star” from Weber and Fields' Twirly Whirly (1902; famously sung by Lillian Russell). He went on to write libretti for operettas and lyrics for musicals, including such works as Fantana (1905), The Spring Maid (1910), Sweethearts (1913), and Angel Face (1919). His last work was The Girl in the Spotlight (credited as Richard Bruce) in 1920. He died in New York City at the age of 76.

== Selected productions ==
- Twirly Whirly – musical, book written in 1902
- Breaking Into Society – musical, book and lyrics written in 1902
- The Spring Maid – musical, book and lyrics written in 1910
- The Rose Maid – musical, lyrics written in 1912
- The Girl from Montmartre – musical, lyrics written in 1913
- Lilac Domino – Broadway adaptation, written in 1914
- A Lonely Romeo – musical, lyrics written in 1919
- Sweethearts – musical, lyrics written for 1929 revival (also 1947 revival)
