= Raymond Allen (stage actor) =

American actor and singer

Allen as Sir Joseph in H.M.S. Pinafore

Raymond Allen (c.1921 – January 29, 1994) was an American stage actor who was best known for his performances in Gilbert and Sullivan and other light operas from the 1950s through the 1980s. He spent most of his career with the American Savoyards and later the Light Opera of Manhattan.

== Biography ==
Allen was born and raised in New York City. He attended Richmond Hill High School in Queens, New York. Early in his career, Allen appeared at various Off-Broadway theatres, including Theatre de Lys in New York's Greenwich Village (later renamed the Lucille Lortel Theatre) and the Long Wharf Theatre in New Haven, Connecticut. In the 1950s and 1960s, Allen performed with Dorothy Raedler's American Savoyards, at first playing chorus and tenor roles and, in 1957, taking over the comic roles in the Gilbert and Sullivan operas.

Allen was the leading principal comic actor of the Light Opera of Manhattan, from 1968 to 1989, starring in shows such as The Mikado, The Pirates of Penzance, H.M.S. Pinafore, The Merry Widow and The Desert Song. After the company's artistic director, William Mount-Burke, died in 1984, Allen became co-artistic director of the company, together with choreographer Jerry Gotham. Allen, Gotham and music director Todd Ellison continued to stage new operettas and musicals after Mount-Burke's death, including the company's successful original musical Little Johnny Jones (first mounted in 1987), based on the songs of George M. Cohan.

Allen also performed with New York City Opera, among other companies from time to time. In 1990, Allen starred in a brief run of The Merry Widow at Westchester's Emelin Theatre. He also appeared in commercials and films.

Allen was married to Rhanda Spotton, another member of the Light Opera of Manhattan.
