= Fritzi Scheff =

American actress (1879–1954)

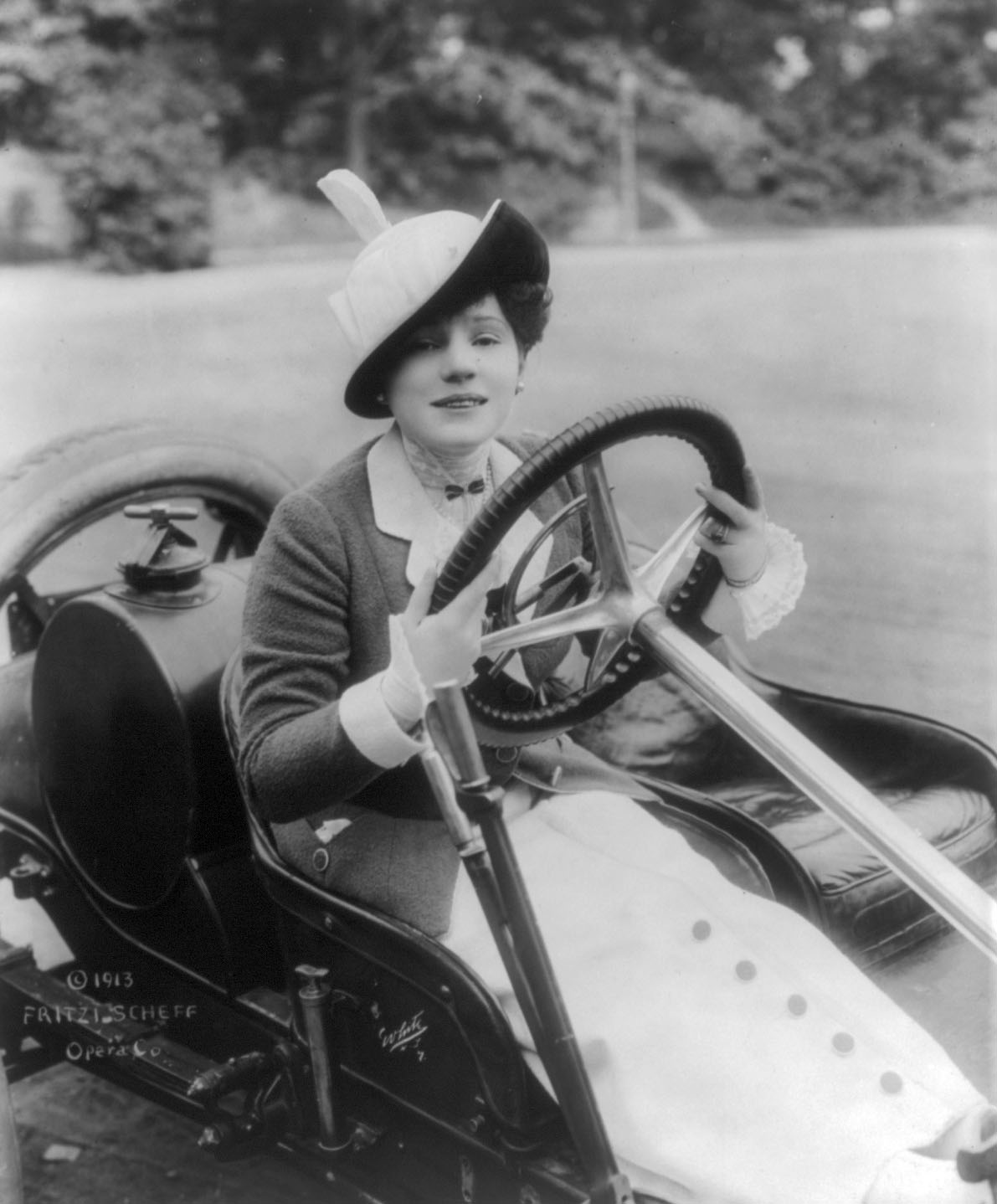
- Fritzi Scheff in 1913
- Born: Friederike Scheff; August 30, 1879; Vienna, Austria-Hungary
- Died: April 8, 1954 (aged 74); New York, U.S.
- Occupations: Actress and opera singer
- Spouse(s): Baron Fritz von Bardeleben; John Fox, Jr. George Anderson

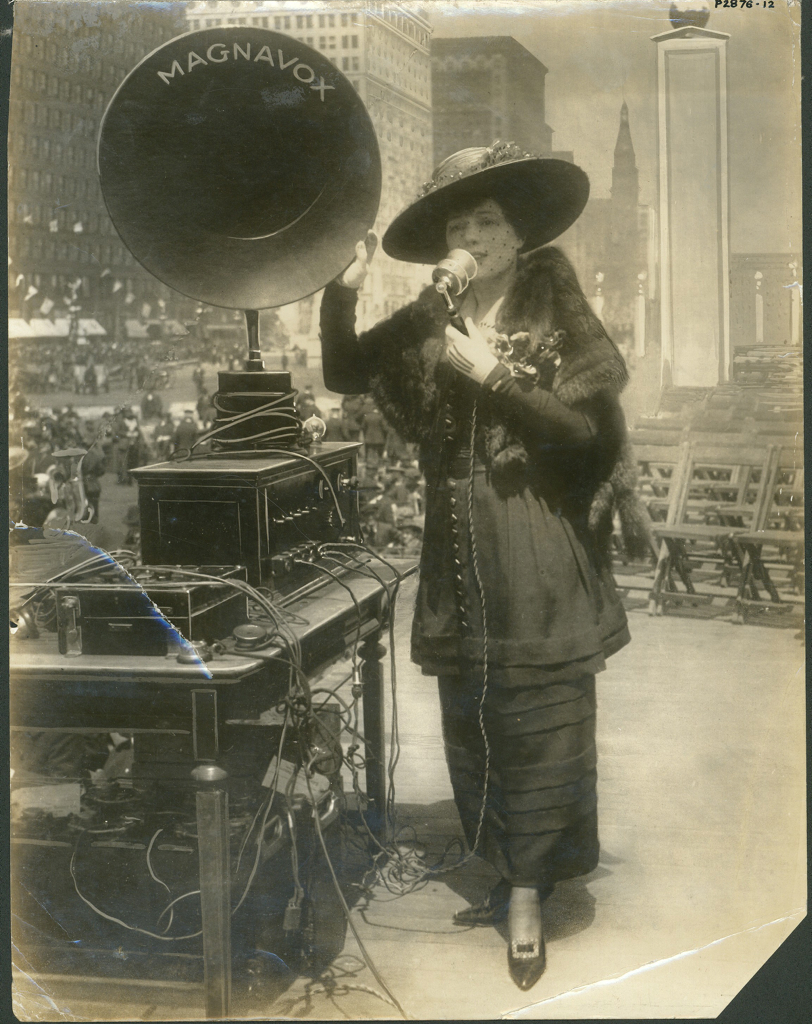
Promoting Fifth Liberty Loan war bonds in New York City, 1919

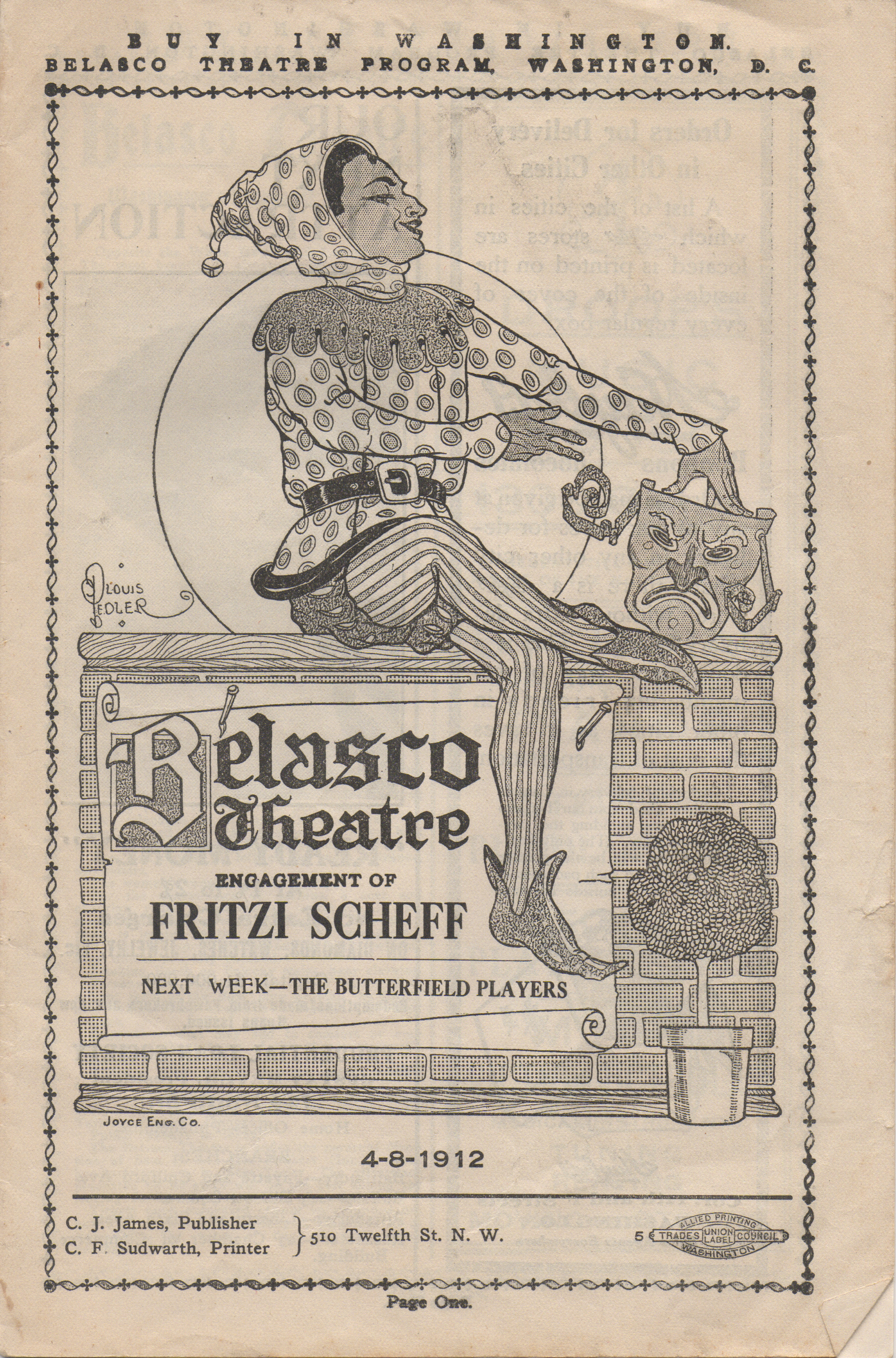
Program for Fritzi Scheff in Die Fledermaus at the Belasco Theater, Washington, D.C., April 8, 1912

Fritzi Scheff (born Friederike Scheff; August 30, 1879 – April 8, 1954) was an American actress and singer.

== Biography ==
Born Friederike Scheff in Vienna to Dr. Gottfried Scheff and Anna Yeager, she studied at the Hoch Conservatory in Frankfurt. She made her debut on January 10, 1897, in Nuremberg. She debuted in Munich at the Royal Opera House.

In 1901 she first appeared at the Metropolitan Opera House, New York, singing roles in La Bohème, Die Meistersinger, Die Walküre, and Don Giovanni. She sang in the Victor Herbert operetta Babette at Washington, D.C., and New York (1903).

Toward the end of the 1904-05 season, Scheff became ill and was replaced by her understudy Ida Hawley to close out the remaining performances of Babette. Scheff had immense success as Fifi in Mlle. Modiste (1905–1908, 1913) and appeared also in The Prima Donna (1908), The Mikado (1910), The Duchess (1911), and The Love Wager (1912). From 1913 to '18, she appeared principally in vaudeville, returning in the latter year to the musical opera stage in Glorianna. Among the roles she sang with the Fritzi Scheff Opera Company was that of Adele in Johann Strauss operatta Die Fledermaus including at the Belasco Theater in Washington, D.C., in 1912.

== Movies and television ==
In 1915 Scheff appeared in her first film, Pretty Mrs. Smith, based on a Broadway play she starred in. It was to be her "vehicle", but critics were mostly negative about her performance and the film; instead, they were positive about Charlotte Greenwood. She made no other silent pictures. In the late 1940s and early 1950s Scheff ventured into sound movies and television. She appeared in night clubs, and died a month after being in Ralph Edwards' This Is Your Life.

== Personal life and death ==
She married, first, Baron Fritz von Bardeleben, a Prussian nobleman; then, in 1908 John Fox, Jr. author of The Trail of the Lonesome Pine, and, in 1913, George Anderson, an actor. The unions were all childless.

Scheff died on April 8, 1954, in New York.
