= The Red Mill =

- Sheet music cover of "The Streets of New York"
- Music: Victor Herbert
- Lyrics: Henry Blossom; Forman Brown
- Book: Henry Blossom; Victor Herbert
- Productions: 1906 Broadway; 1945 Broadway revival

The Red Mill is an operetta written by Victor Herbert, with a libretto by Henry Blossom. The farcical story concerns two American vaudevillians who wreak havoc at an inn in the Netherlands, interfering with two marriages; but all ends well. The musical premiered on Broadway on September 24, 1906, at the Knickerbocker Theatre and ran for 274 performances, starring comedians Fred Stone and David C. Montgomery. It also had a London run and toured extensively, and in 1945 had a long-running Broadway revival. The Red Mill includes the famous songs "Every Day is Lady's Day with Me", "The Streets of New York", "You Never Can Tell About a Woman", and "Because You're You".

== Synopsis ==
In a village in the Netherlands, two American vaudevillians, Con and Kid, who have been travelling in Europe but itch to get back to New York, are stranded penniless at a little inn. As painters and their models sing about the troubles of being a poor artist, the models try to convince the painters to quit their work and have some fun ("By the Side of the Mill"). Overhearing the models complaining, Tina points out that at least the girls have boyfriends. Prompted by this statement Flora discloses that she longs for her painter to say that he loves her, and will one day, marry her ("Loved But Me"). Con and Kid try to sneak out of the inn without paying their bill, but they are discovered and sent to jail. However, Willem, the innkeeper, takes pity on them and arranges for them to work at the inn to pay off their debt.

The Burgomaster's daughter, Gretchen, loves Captain Doris van Damm. Her father, however, wishes her to marry the Governor of Zeeland. Con and Kid agree to help Gretchen and the Captain to elope, but Willem overhears and tells the Burgomaster, who locks Gretchen in the windmill. The Americans try to rescue her while the Burgomaster finishes preparations for an immediate wedding. Plotting with Tina, the two Americans finally help Gretchen to escape. At the wedding festivities (which are missing the bride) Con and Kid appear disguised as Sherlock Holmes and Watson, and "help" the Burgomaster find his daughter. Bertha replaces Gretchen as the bride, as the governor was her childhood sweetheart. When Bertha's identity is then revealed, it turns out that Captain Van Damm is heir to a large fortune, and her father allows Gretchen to marry him. The Americans can finally return home to New York ("New York").

== Principal roles and original cast ==
- Con Kidder, Kid Conner, two Americans "doing" Europe – Fred Stone and David Montgomery
- Burgomaster Jan van Borken, of Katwyck-aan-Zee – Edward Begley

Photo from the 1906 production

- Bertha, his sister – Allene Crater
- Gretchen, his daughter – Augusta Greenleaf
- Willem, innkeeper at the "Red Mill" – David L. Don
- Tina, his daughter – Ethel Johnson
- Captain Doris van Damm – Joseph M. Ratliff
- Flora, a painters model – Connie Eastman
- Franz, the sheriff of Katwyck-aan-Zee – Charles Dox
- The Governor of Zeeland – Neal McCay
- Joshua Pennyfeather, an English solicitor – Claude Cooper
- Countess de la Fère, an automobilist – Juliette Dika

== Musical numbers ==
Act I

- By the Side of the Mill - Chorus
- Loved But Me - Flora, Tina and Chorus
- Mignonette - Tina and Girls
- You Can Never Tell About a Woman - Jan Van Borkem and Willem
- Whistle It - Kid Conner, Con Kidder and Tina
- A Widow Has Ways - Bertha
- (In) The Isle of Our Dreams - Captain Doris Van Damm and Gretchen
- (Always) Go While the Goin' Is Good - Con Kidder, Kid Conner, Tina and Bertha
- An Accident - Countess de La Tere, Tina and Chorus
- Moonbeams - Gretchen, Captain Doris Van Damm and Male Chorus

Act II

- Gossip Song - Bertha and Chorus
- (The) Legend of the Mill - Bertha and Chorus
- Good-a-bye, John (Lyrics By Harry Williams, Music By Egbert Van Alstyne) - Con Kidder and Kid Conner
- I Want You to Marry Me! - Tina and Chorus
- Every Day Is Ladies' Day With Me - The Governor of Zeeland and Male Chorus
- Because You're You - Bertha and The Governor of Zeeland
- The Streets of New York (In Old New York) - Con Kidder, Kid Conner and Chorus
- The Wedding Song (Wedding Bells) - The Governor of Zeeland and Chorus
- The Streets of New York (In Old New York) - Entire Company

== Productions and adaptations ==
The show was given tryouts at several upstate New York cities and in Montreal, Canada. For the original Broadway production in 1906, producer Charles Dillingham made theatrical history by placing in front of the Knickerbocker Theater a revolving red windmill powered and lit by electricity. This was Broadway's first moving illuminated sign. The Broadway production closed on June 29, 1907, before touring.

A 1927 silent movie version starred Marion Davies and was directed by Roscoe "Fatty" Arbuckle under the pseudonym of William Goodrich. The situation of Gretchen and the Captain is retained from the operetta, but it is made a subplot. Davies' character was invented for the film.

The operetta was revived on October 16, 1945, opening at the Ziegfeld Theatre, and running for 531 performances. It was produced by Hunt Stromberg Jr. featured Michael O'Shea, Eddie Foy Jr., Juli Lynne Charlot, Eddie Dew, Charles Collins, Odette Myrtil and Hal Price. Jack Whiting replaced O'Shea as Con Kidder at least once on February 18, 1946.

== Recordings ==
Decca Records recorded six selections (on three 10-inch 78-RPM records) in 1945. The recording featured Eileen Farrell, Wilbur Evans, and Felix Knight with a chorus and orchestra conducted by Jay Blackton. This album was reissued on one side of a 12-inch Lp (Babes in Toyland was on the reverse) in 1957. This edition stayed in print until 1969. After a long absence from the catalogue, Decca Broadway reissued the complete album on CD (again paired with Babes) in 2002.

Also in 1945, RCA Victor issued an album based on the hit Broadway revival but using studio singers (and Al Goodman's orchestra) instead of the Broadway cast. These eight highlights were issued on Lp by RCA Victor (1951) and on their budget label RCA Camden (1958) but have been unavailable in any format since 1960.

A Capitol album starring Gordon MacRae was issued as part of a series of recordings based on MacRae's popular Railroad Hour program, which featured potted operettas and musicals. It was conducted by Carmen Dragon. The first release in 1954 was a 10-inch LP [Capitol Records L-530, and FBF-530 (2xEP Box-Set]. It was reissued in 1955 on one side of a 12-inch LP with Naughty Marietta on the reverse [Capitol T-551]. This version was released on CD in 2008 as The Music of Victor Herbert (Anteater Records AECD-1004), along with selections from Naughty Marietta and Sweethearts.

A stereo recording was made by Reader's Digest for their 1963 album Treasury of Great Operettas. Each of the 18 operettas in the set is condensed to fill one LP side. The Red Mill selections from Reader's Digest have also been re-released on CD.

In the 1920s, Chandler Goldwaithe "recorded" selections from The Red Mill on a paper roll for use in an E. M. Skinner player organ. A CD of this roll playing on a 1929 Skinner organ was released by JAV Recordings in 2001.

In 2001 the Ohio Light Opera (OLO) commissioned a new critical edition of the opera from Quade Winter, based on the composer's original manuscripts in the Library of Congress. A complete recording of this edition by OLO was issued by Albany Records the same year.
