= Ohio Light Opera =

The Ohio Light Opera is a professional opera company based in Wooster, Ohio that performs the light opera repertory, including Gilbert and Sullivan, American, British and continental operettas, and other musical theatre works, especially of the late 19th and early 20th centuries. The company is also known for its recordings of these works.

== Description ==
The Ohio Light Opera was founded as a cultural and educational endeavor at the College of Wooster in 1979 and has been owned and operated since its inception by the College of Wooster. It grew out of the Kent State Light Opera, which was founded by James Stuart, formerly of the American Savoyards. When the Kent group ended, it was soon transferred to Wooster, with Stuart continuing as its guiding force. The company performs the entire Gilbert and Sullivan repertoire, as well as rarely performed American, British, and continental operettas, Edwardian musical comedies and other musical theatre, mostly of the late 19th and early 20th centuries. Educationally, the company offers young, talented vocalists and instrumentalists the opportunity to perform in a professional setting.

In 2008, the company's 30th season, Ohio Light Opera presented its 100th production. The company's performing season usually starts in mid-June and ends in mid-August. It generally performs seven or eight different works in repertory in the course of a nine-week season that attracts approximately 22,000 patrons annually. Performances take place in the Freedlander Theatre on the College of Wooster's campus in Wooster, Ohio.

Richard Morris of The Schubert Institute (UK) reported on the company's production of Das Dreimäderlhaus in 2002 as follows:

"This is not a local ‘operatic’ society churning out an annual production... but a serious attempt to preserve an authentic operetta tradition.... The new translation made it very easy to keep up with the complicated comings and goings of the plot. There was excellent singing throughout, especially from Hannerl (Julie Wright) and Schober (Brian Woods), and the scene with the Tschöll's (Ben Smith and Yvonne Douthat) one big number "That's how it goes" (i.e. "Geh, Alte, schau") worked especially well. Lucia Grisi (Robin Bricker), a part that is a caricature (the Italian ‘prima donna’), was exactly as she should have been. This act has a big finale, with Schubert, who has just lost Hannerl to Schober, breaking down whilst singing Ungeduld, which was magnificent, leaving a buzz in the audience. Overall, this was a very enjoyable performance, and well worth the hassle of a long journey to attend."

== Recordings ==
The company has produced numerous recordings, usually recorded live in performance. In addition to eight Gilbert and Sullivan recordings, it has recorded Victor Herbert's Naughty Marietta, Eileen, Sweethearts and The Red Mill; English-language versions of Emmerich Kálmán’s Autumn Maneuvers, The Bayadere, The Violet of Montmartre, Countess Maritza and Der Zigeunerprimas; John Philip Sousa's El Capitan; and Rudolf Friml's The Vagabond King and The Firefly, as well as lesser-known or rarely recorded works like Veronique, The Arcadians, De Koven's Robin Hood, Zeller's The Birdseller, Das Dreimäderlhaus, Romberg's Maytime, Breton's La Verbena de la Paloma, William Walton's Facade, English-language versions of Offenbach's The Brigands and Bluebeard, Jerome Kern's The Cabaret Girl and Strauss's A Night in Venice.

Some of these recordings are CD premieres. While some of the recordings are described by the company as "complete", in fact they incorporate significant cuts. Reviewers have commented on the unevenness of Ohio Light Opera's casts and sometimes noted the American accents used in English works, but some of the recordings have received favorable reviews. Fanfare magazine called these recordings, particularly those "of lesser-known works ... valuable additions to recorded libraries". The company issued a 5-hour, 4-CD set of company highlights from its first 25 years called Gold and Silver: Celebrating 25 Years of The Ohio Light Opera. The forty-page booklet enclosed with the set includes a company history and reminiscences of performers heard on the recordings.

The company has also released DVDs of their 2005 production of A Soldier's Promise, an English-language adaptation of Der gute Kamerad by Emmerich Kálmán, and their 2009 production of Herbert's Mlle. Modiste.
