= The Enchantress (operetta) =

Operetta composed by Victor Herbert

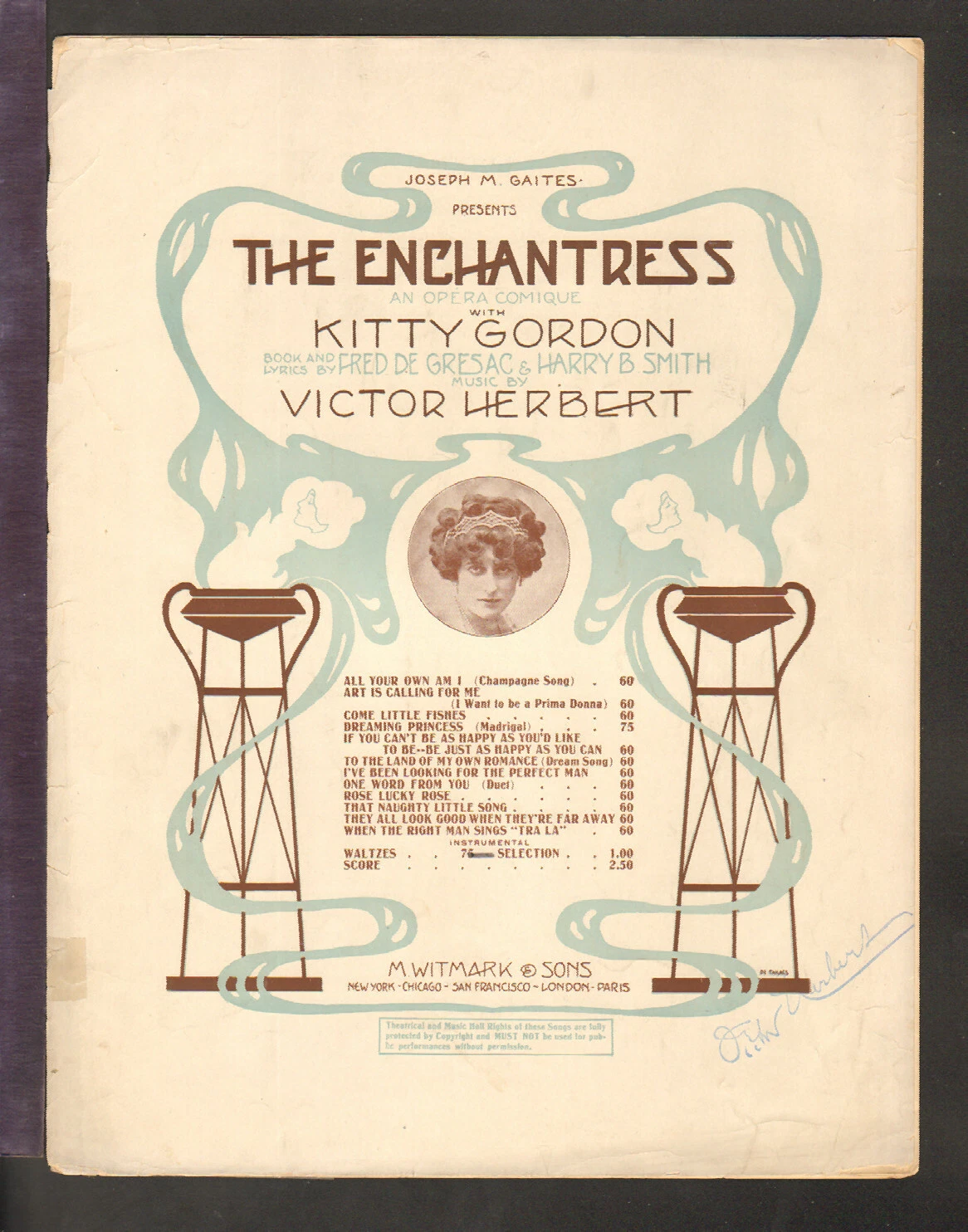
Sheet music from The Enchantress (1911)

The Enchantress is an operetta in two acts with music by Victor Herbert, lyrics by Harry B. Smith and a book by Fred de Gresac. To prevent spoiled Prince Ivan from ascending to his rightful throne, Zergovia's regent and war minister scheme to have him "enchanted" by an alluring opera singer, Vivien Savary, as marriage to a commoner would require him to abdicate. The head of the secret service helps to thwart the plan, as does Vivien, who falls for the prince; meanwhile, several princesses and an American heiress also vie for the prince's hand.

The operetta premiered in Washington, D.C., and quickly moved to Broadway in October 1911, where it played for 104 performances, followed two years of touring in North America. Revivals followed in 1929 at The Muny and later off-off-Broadway and elsewhere. Historian Ken Wlaschin in the Encyclopedia of American Opera described the work as a "neglected comic opera" best known for the coloratura soprano aria "Art Is Calling for Me", which has become a frequently programmed recital piece recorded by sopranos like Beverly Sills and Kiri Te Kanawa. Historian Kurt Gänzl stated the song "To The Land of My Own Romance" was the hit song of the show during its performances in the 1910s, but that only the song "Art Is Calling for Me" has maintained enduring relevance in the modern era.

== Plot ==
Prince Ivan is heir to the throne of Zergovia. There is much competition for Ivan's romantic attentions. Princesses Diana, Stellina, Stephanie, Poppy, Floria, Hortensia, and Bernice compete for the prince's heart or his hand. American heiress Marion Love also maneuvers for a marriage to the prince; hoping her wealth will help earn her a royal title. Meanwhile, Prince Regent Miloch hopes to supplant Ivan and become king. He plots with Ozir, Zergovia's minister of war, to find a way to remove the prince. They decide the best way to neutralize the prince is to manipulate him into abdicating his throne by getting him to fall in love with a non-royal woman as Zergovian law states that the prince can only marry a royal. They enlist the charismatic opera singer Vivien Savary (a.k.a. "The Enchantress") to steal the prince's heart.

Ivan becomes smitten when he meets Vivien, and it appears that the plan may work. However, they are ultimately thwarted by Troute, Zergovia's head of Secret Service, who, comically, uses a series of disguises to spy on Miloch and Ozir. He ultimately exposes them with the help of Vivien, who has fallen genuinely in love with Prince Ivan and wants to do the right thing by him. All ends well when it is discovered that Vivien does descend from royal blood, and she and Prince Ivan can marry without losing the crown.

== Performance history ==
=== Premiere and Broadway production ===
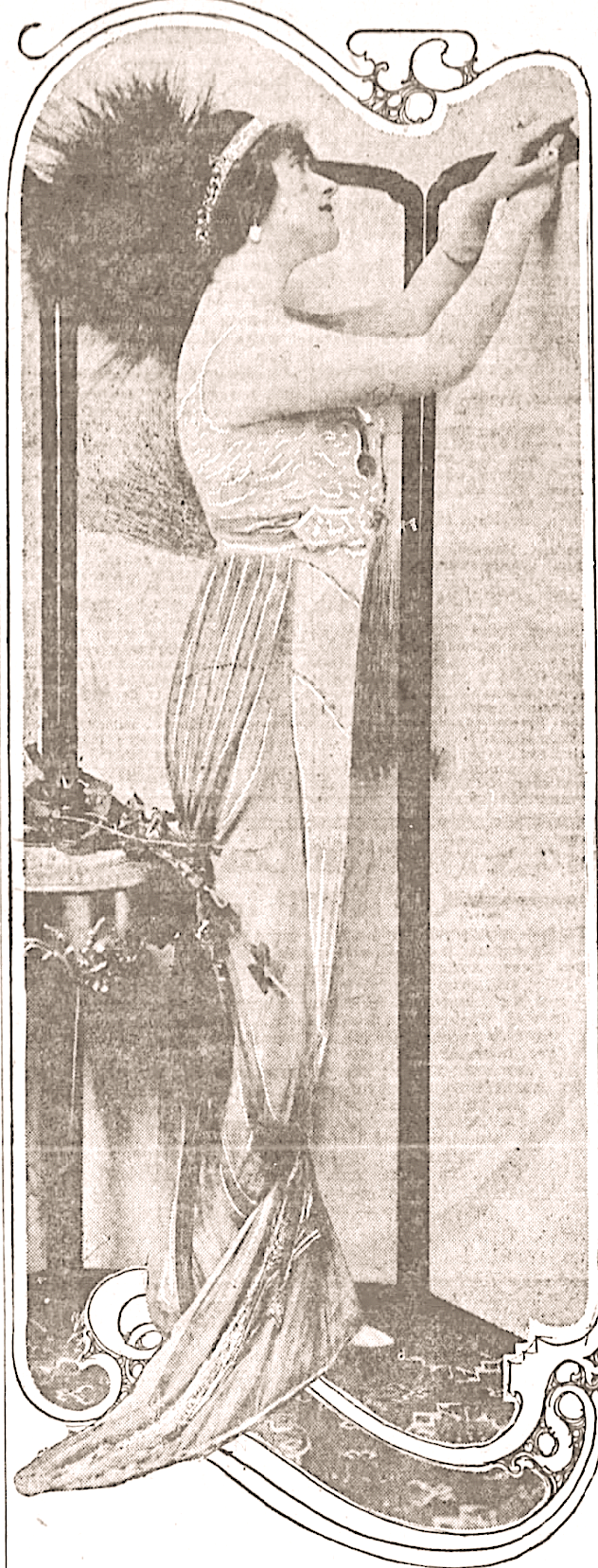
1913 press photo of Kitty Gordon in The Enchantress.

The Enchantress premiered at the National Theatre in Washington, D.C. on October 9, 1911, with a cast led by Kitty Gordon as Vivien. The cast also included Harold Forde as Prince Iva, Ralph Riggs as Troute, Hattie Arnold as Mamoute, Nellie McCoy as Marion Love, Ida Fitzhugh as Princess Diana, Venita Fitzhugh as Princess Stephanie, Arthur Forrest as Ozir, and Katherine Witchie as Nina. The production moved to Broadway where it opened at New York Theatre on October 19, 1911, with the same cast. It ran there for a total of 104 performances, closing on January 20, 1912.

=== First North American tour ===
The production then toured with its original cast intact and Herbert conducting performances, beginning in Philadelphia at Chestnut Street Opera House in late January 1912. Other stops on the tour in 1912 included Parsons Theatre in Hartford, Connecticut; Ford's Grand Opera House in Baltimore; Star Theatre in Buffalo, New York; the Collingwood Opera House in Poughkeepsie, New York; the Princess Theatre in Toronto; His Majesty's Theatre, Montreal; the Grand Opera House in Hamilton, Ontario; Russell Theatre in Ottawa; Newark Theatre in New Jersey; Apollo Theatre in Atlantic City; Colonial Theatre in Boston; Court Square Theatre in Springfield, Massachusetts; the Jefferson Theatre in Portland, Maine; Lyric Theatre in Allentown, Pennsylvania; the Majestic Theatre in Harrisburg, Pennsylvania; Nixon Theatre in Pittsburgh; Lyceum Theatre in Scranton, Pennsylvania; Valentine Theatre in Toledo, Ohio; the Grand Opera House in Cincinnati; the Detroit Opera House in Michigan; Illinois Theatre on Jackson Boulevard in Chicago; and return engagements in New York City for brief runs at Teller's Broadway Theatre in Brooklyn, Montauk Theatre in Brooklyn, and the Grand Opera House in Manhattan.

The Enchantress continued to tour the Midwestern United States from January to March 1913, with stops in Michigan at Stone's Opera House in Flint; Power's Opera House in Grand Rapids; The Athenaeum in Jackson; Whitney Theater in Ann Arbor; Gladmer Theatre in Lansing; Fuller Theatre in Kalamazoo. The production also toured to the Metropolitan Theatre in Minneapolis, Minnesota; Waterloo Theatre in Waterloo, Iowa; the Burtis Opera House in Davenport, Iowa; Berchel Theatre in Des Moines, Iowa; Brandeis Theatre in Omaha, Nebraska; Oliver Theatre in Lincoln, Nebraska; the Grand Theater in Topeka, Kansas; Willis Wood Theater in Kansas City, Missouri; Olympic Theatre in St. Louis; the Chatterton Opera House in Bloomington, Illinois; Joliet Theatre in Joliet; the Powers Opera House in Decatur, Illinois; Oliver Opera House in South Bend, Indiana; Wells-Bijou Theatre in Evansville, Indiana; and English's Opera House in Indianapolis. The tour also went further south to Macauley's Theatre in Louisville, Kentucky; and the Lexington Opera House. In late March 1913 the tour was impacted by the Great Flood of 1913; stranding members of the company. The tour then ended, and Gordon became a headliner in the Orpheum Circuit in April 1913.

=== Second North American tour ===
A second tour of The Enchantress began in Winnipeg, Canada on September 2, 1913, at Walker Theatre. This tour was also headlined by Kitty Gordon in the title role, but with a mostly different cast in the other parts. Herbert did not join this tour as conductor with a Mr. Mayhood serving as musical director. The only other returning performers were Hattie Arnold as Mamoute and Arthur Forrest as Ozir. New cast members included the German operatic tenor Gustav Werner (1881–1963) as Prince Ivan, Inez Bauer as Marion Love, Walter Catlett as Troute, Helen Goff as Princess Stellina, Mary Ambrose as Princess Diana, Ernest Torrence as Poff, Sydney Deane as Milock, and Edith Abbott as Mina. There were several stops in Montana on this tour including the Broadway Theatre in Butte; the Grand Opera House in Great Falls; Babcock Theatre in Billings; Missoula Theater; and Helena Theatre.

The second tour also traversed the Pacific Northwest for performances at the Heilig Theatre in Portland, Oregon; Moore Theatre in Seattle; the American Theatre in Spokane, Washington; Tacoma Theatre; and Keylor Grand Theatre in Walla Walla. Other stops on this tour included Royal Victoria Theatre in British Columbia and Cort Theatre in San Francisco. Robert Woolsey took over the role of Troute by the time the production reached Macdonough Theatre in Oakland, California on October 20, 1913. It then played at the Majestic Theatre in Los Angeles, where, on October 30, 1913, Gordon collapsed on the stage during her performance, and the audience was subsequently dismissed. It was reported that she was seriously ill, and the remaining tour dates were cancelled.

=== Other performances ===
Ken Wlaschin described The Enchantress as a "neglected comic opera" with no professional stagings of note in the modern era. The Muny presented the operetta in St. Louis, Missouri, in 1929. In 1982 the work was revived off-off-Broadway in New York by Bel Canto Opera Company with a new book by Frederick S. Roffman, who also directed the production. The cast was led by Joyce Guyer-Hiller as Vivien. The New York Times described this production as amateur and not reaching the standards of a professional company. Victor Herbert Renaissance Project produced the piece at Christ & St. Stephens Episcopal Church in New York City in 2018, directed by Alyce Mott.

Kurt Gänzl's entry on The Enchantress in The Encyclopedia of Musical Theatre lists only one performance of The Enchantress occurring outside the United States. He states that the work was presented in a one-off performance at Ladbroke Hall in Southam, Warwickshire for its UK debut on October 9, 1911. According to Gänzl, the operetta was "not picked up for overseas productions" and only enjoyed popularity in America on tour in performances given mainly by Kitty Gordon. Another production was mounted in December 2019 at Accidental Theatre, Belfast, Northern Ireland by NI Opera.

== Recordings ==
In 1912 selections from The Enchantress were recorded by the Victor Herbert Orchestra under the baton of the composer for the Victor Talking Machine Company. This recording was later included on the 1977 New World Records LP And Then We Wrote: American Composers and Lyricists Sing, Play, and Conduct Their Own Songs. The Comic Opera Guild of Ann Arbor, Michigan, recorded the operetta live in June 2004 with 2 piano accompaniment.

The aria "The Land of My Own Romance" was first recorded in 1912 by Lucy Isabelle Marsh for Victor. Beverly Sills later recorded both this aria and the song "Art is Calling for Me" with the London Symphony Orchestra for the album Music of Victor Herbert (1975, EMI). "Art is Calling for Me" has also been recorded by Lesley Garett with the Philharmonia Orchestra in 1992, Virginia Croskery with the Slovak Radio Symphony Orchestra in 1999 for Naxos Records, and multiple times by soprano Kiri Te Kanawa. Te Kanawa included the song in two filmed live concerts: Kiri in Concert which was filmed at the Barbican Centre with Carl Davis conducting the Royal Philharmonic Orchestra in 1989, and Kiri: Her Greatest Hits Live at Royal Albert Hall with Stephen Barlow and the London Symphony Orchestra in 1994.

== Characters and original cast ==
- Vivien Savary, an opera singer – Kitty Gordon
- Moumoute, her aunt – Hattie Arnold
- Marion Love, an American heiress – Nellie McCoy
- Princess Diana, of Russia – Ida Fitzhugh
- Princess Stellina – Louise Bliss
- Princess Stephanie, a childhood friend of Ivan's – Venita Fitzhugh
- Princess Poppy – Nina Barbour
- Princess Floria – Mabel Berra
- Princess Hortensia – Clarice Gilberte
- Princess Bernice – Dorothy Berry
- Prince Ivan, of Zergovia – Harold Forde
- Troute, Head of the Secret Service – Ralph Riggs
- Poff, the Prince's tutor – Gilbert Clayton
- Milock, Regent of Zergovia – Harrison Brockbank
- Ozir, Minister of War – Arthur Forrest
- Prince Zepi, Stephanie's father – Bertram Fox
- Mina, Vivien's maid – Katherine Witchie

== Musical numbers ==
=== Act I ===
- In Long, Long Trains – Princesses
- When the Right Man Sings 'Tra La' – Prince Zepi and Princess Stephanie
- They All Look Good When They're Far Away – Troute and Poff
- If You Can't Be as Happy as You'd Like to Be, Be Just as Happy as You Can – Miloch and Chorus
- And That (Last) Little Girl Is You – Ivan°
- (To the) Land of My Own Romance – Vivien Savary
- I've Been Looking for a Perfect Man – Marion Love and Princesses
- Rose, Lucky Rose – Vivien and Ivan
- Finale – Company

=== Act II ===
- Opening – Princesses, Troute and Chorus
- Art is Calling for Me (I Want to Be a Prima Donna) – Princess Stellina and Chorus
- Come Little Fishes (Goldfish Song) – Vivien
- Come to Sunny Spain – Troute and Mamoute
- One Word from You – Vivien and Ivan
- Dreaming Princess – Princesses
- That Naughty/Pretty Little Song – Marion and Princesses
- All Your Own Am I (The Champagne Song) – Vivien and Ozir
- Finale – Company

°The libretto puts Ivan's song in Act I before Miloch's.
