= Lux Video Theatre =

American television anthology series (1950–1957)

- 1954 production of A Place in the Sun on the series
- Genre: Anthology
- Presented by: James Mason (1954–1955); Otto Kruger (1955–1956); Gordon MacRae (1956–1957); Ken Carpenter (1955–1957)
- Country of origin: United States
- Original language: English
- No. of seasons: 7
- No. of episodes: 336

Production
- Running time: 24–25 mins. (1950–1954); 47–50 mins. (1954–1957)

Original release
- Network: CBS (1950–1954); NBC (1954–1957)
- Release: October 2, 1950 – September 12, 1957

Related
- Lux Radio Theater; Lux Playhouse

Lux Video Theatre is an American television anthology series that was produced from 1950 until 1957. The series presented both comedy and drama in original teleplays, as well as abridged adaptations of films and plays.

== Overview ==
The Lux Video Theatre was a spin-off from the successful Lux Radio Theater series broadcast on the NBC Blue Network (1934–1935) and CBS (1935–1955).

Lux Video Theatre began as a live 30-minute Monday evening CBS series on October 2, 1950, switching to Thursday nights during August, 1951. In September 1953, the show relocated from New York to Hollywood. On August 26, 1954, it debuted on NBC as an hour-long show on Thursday nights, telecast until September 12, 1957. With the introduction of the one-hour format and the move to Hollywood, abridged versions of popular films were often used as the basis for shows.

To introduce each act and interview the stars at the conclusion, NBC added a series of regular hosts: James Mason (1954–55), Otto Kruger (1955–56), Gordon MacRae (1956–57) and Ken Carpenter (1955–1957). Kruger recalled:

All I do is come up and tell the people who I am and what we're up to. I don't have a single thing to do with producing, directing or casting the show. Yet I get letters every week complimenting me on my production, my directing, my casting, even my script adaptations.

New episodes were broadcast during the summer as the Summer Video Theatre. In 1957–58, Lux shifted sponsorship to a half-hour musical variety show, The Lux Show Starring Rosemary Clooney.

For the 1958–59 season, the dramatic series was brought back with a new name, Lux Playhouse. The new series alternated weeks with Schlitz Playhouse. Those broadcasts began on October 3, 1958, and ended on September 18, 1959.

The series finished in the Nielsen ratings at #30 in the 1950–51 season and #25 in 1955–56.

== Episodes ==
Selected Episodes of Lux Video Theatre
Date	Title	Actor(s)
October 2, 1950	"Saturday's Children	Joan Caulfield, John Ericson, Una O'Connor, Eileen Heckart, Ralph Riggs
November 20, 1950	"Goodnight Please"	Franchot Tone
November 27, 1950	"The Token"	Wanda Hendrix, Dean Harens, June Dayton
December 25, 1950	"A Child Is Born"	Thomas Mitchell, Fay Bainter
May 14, 1951	"Local Storm"	Betty Field
September 24, 1951	"A Matter of Life"	Edmond O'Brien
August 11, 1952	"The Orchard"	Geraldine Brooks, Skip Homeier, Anne Seymour, Henry Jones, Andy Duggan
August 18, 1952	"You Be the Bad Guy"	MacDonald Carey, Biff Elliot, William Harrigan, Joe Verdi, Joe De Santis, Rudy Bond, Robert Dale Martin, Frank Grosso, Vincent Barbi, Christopher Barbery, Buzzy Martin, Bettye Ackerman, P. Jay Sidney, Andy Sabilia
August 25, 1952	"The Magnolia Touch"	Nina Foch, Donald Cook, June Dayton, Jamie Smith
October 6, 1952	"Legacy of Love"	Corinne Calvet, Steven Hill
October 20, 1952	"The Country Lawyer"	Thomas Mitchell, Russell Collins, Whit Bissell, Harry Antrim, Dorothy Blackburn, Charles Thompson, John McGovern
October 27, 1952	"Autumn Nocturne"	Lilli Palmer, Joseph Anthony, Frank Tweddell, Anita Bayless
November 3, 1952	"The Face of Autumn"	Pat O'Brien, Anna Berger, Ann Seymour, Frank Campanella, William L. Erwin, Tony Canzoneri
November 10, 1952	"Something to Celebrate"	Paul Lukas, Signe Hasso, E. a. Krumschmidt, anna Appel, Nils Asther, Paul Andor, Alfred Hesse, Eva Gerson, Walter Echler, Constance Hoffman, Ella Monnard, Sidney Lee, Jane Sparks, Bruce Reynolds, Mildred Reynolds, Josie Robertson, Walter Teschan
November 17, 1952	"The Man Who Struck It Rich"	Barry Fitzgerald, Arthur Shields, Una O'Conner, Rex O'Malley, Barry MacCollum, Peg Mayo, Floyd Buckley, Naomi Riordan, William Portrude, Ann Sullivan, Tom McElhaney, Neil Fitzgerald, Gina Shield
March 11, 1954	"Call Me Mrs."	Laraine Day, Hugh Beaumont
August 26, 1954	"To Each His Own"	Dorothy McGuire, Mel Ferrer

== Notable guest stars ==
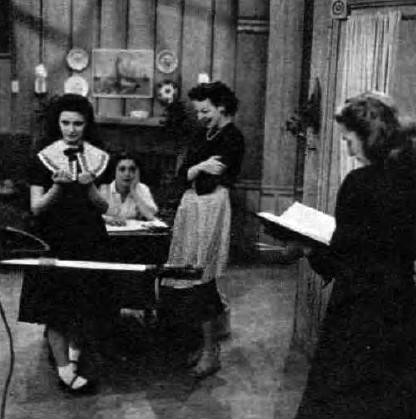
A 1951 rehearsal for the program. From left: Margaret O'Brien, Pat Gaye, Anna Lee, and script girl Audrey Peters

Among those cast in the productions were:

- Julie Adams
- Mary Astor
- Anne Bancroft
- William Bendix
- Joan Blondell
- Ann Blyth
- Richard Boone
- Ernest Borgnine
- Eddie Bracken
- Scott Brady
- Walter Brennan
- Barbara Britton
- Charles Bronson
- Raymond Burr
- Hoagy Carmichael
- Art Carney
- Jack Carson
- Rosemary Clooney
- Lee J. Cobb
- Charles Coburn
- Nat 'King' Cole
- Jackie Cooper
- Broderick Crawford
- Bing Crosby
- Robert Cummings
- Arlene Dahl
- Laraine Day
- James Dean
- John Derek
- Melvyn Douglas
- Paul Douglas
- Joanne Dru
- Nelson Eddy
- Bill Erwin
- Barry Fitzgerald
- Nina Foch
- Janet Gaynor
- Bonita Granville
- Coleen Gray
- Eileen Heckart
- Van Heflin
- Charlton Heston
- William Holden
- Celeste Holm
- Bob Hope
- Miriam Hopkins
- Dennis Hopper
- Rock Hudson
- Dean Jagger
- David Janssen
- Shirley Jones
- Boris Karloff
- Buster Keaton
- Grace Kelly
- Veronica Lake
- Burt Lancaster
- Angela Lansbury
- Cloris Leachman
- Jack Lemmon
- Gene Lockhart
- June Lockhart
- Jack Lord
- Peter Lorre
- Dayton Lummis
- Jeanette MacDonald
- Fred MacMurray
- Dorothy Malone
- Herbert Marshall
- Fredric March
- James Mason
- Raymond Massey
- Carole Mathews
- Walter Matthau
- Mercedes McCambridge
- Roddy McDowell
- Dorothy McGuire
- Butterfly McQueen
- Sal Mineo
- Vera Miles
- Thomas Mitchell (actor)
- Felicia Montealegre Bernstein
- Rita Moreno
- Dennis Morgan
- Audie Murphy
- Don Murray (actor)
- Kim Novak
- Margaret O'Brien
- Maureen O'Hara
- Maureen O'Sullivan
- Geraldine Page
- Lilli Palmer
- Dick Powell
- Robert Preston (actor)
- Vincent Price
- Luise Rainer
- Edward G. Robinson
- Basil Rathbone
- Ronald Reagan
- Thelma Ritter
- Lizabeth Scott
- Karen Sharpe
- Ann Sheridan
- Sylvia Sidney
- Alexis Smith
- Karen Steele
- Rod Steiger
- Jan Sterling
- Robert Sterling
- Rod Taylor
- Phyllis Thaxter
- Franchot Tone
- Claire Trevor
- Roland Young
- Beverly Washburn
- James Whitmore
- Esther Williams
- Natalie Wood
- Joanne Woodward
- Teresa Wright
- Florenz Ames
