= Ralph Riggs =

American actor (1885–1951)

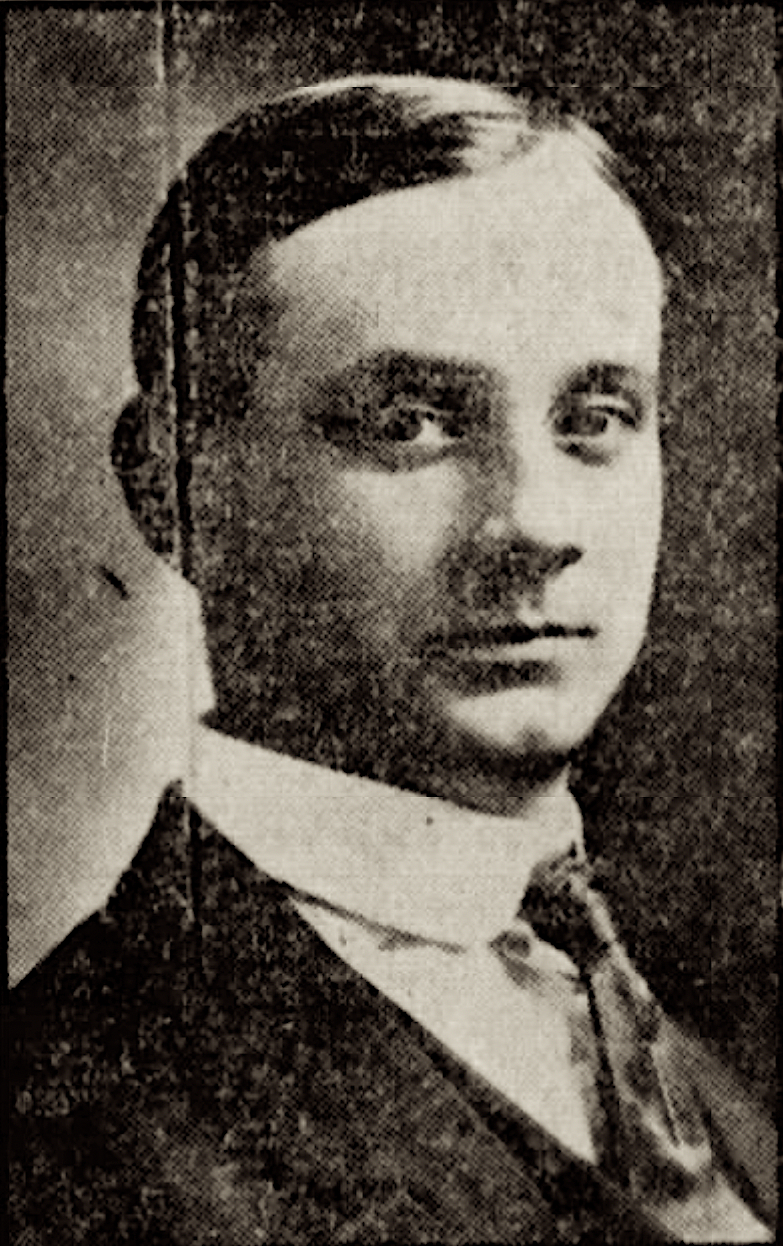
1911 photograph of Ralph Riggs

Ralph Roland Riggs (February 12, 1885 – September 16, 1951) was an American actor, singer, dancer, and choreographer. He worked primarily on stage as a musical theatre actor, baritone in light opera, and dancer, but also occasionally appeared in straight plays. He also choreographed several Broadway productions. He appeared in several musical short films in the 1930s and at the very end of his career appeared on American television from 1949 to 1951.

Riggs was the son of actress Rose Stillman, and began his career as a child performer in his mother's theatre troupe. He was a member of the Boston Ideal Opera Company in the summer of 1902 and 1903, and performed as a member of the Ed Andrews Opera Company from 1902 to 1905. After making his Broadway debut in 1907 he formed a partnership with his wife, the dancer Katherine Witchie, with whom he toured in vaudeville and starred in several Broadway shows, among them the original productions of The Enchantress (1911), All Aboard (1913), The Princess Pat (1915), and Oh, Ernest! (1927). Without his wife he portrayed The Chief Justice in both the original 1931 production and the 1933 Broadway revival of George and Ira Gershwin's Of Thee I Sing, and appeared in the original Broadway casts of Louisiana Purchase (1941) and Oklahoma! (1943). His final stage appearance was in 1951 as Arvide Abernathy in the first national tour of Guys and Dolls. He died three weeks after leaving that tour in September 1951 at the age of 66.

== Early life and career ==
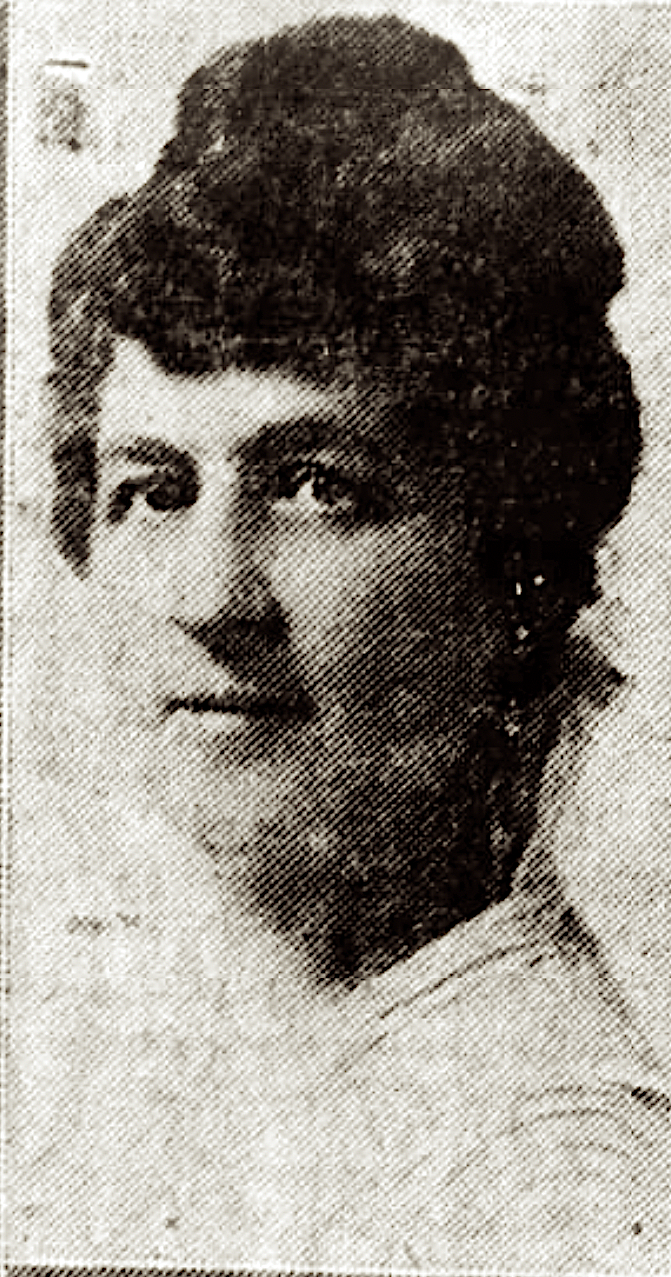
Rose Stillman, the mother of Ralph Riggs

Ralph Riggs was born in St. Paul, Minnesota, on February 12, 1885. His father, Charles A. Riggs, was a cornettist, composer, and theatrical impresario and manager. His mother was the actress Rose Stillman, who had her own touring theatre troupe during the 19th century. He made his professional stage debut as a baby, playing the part of Eliza's child in Uncle Tom's Cabin when he was less than a year old. His first speaking role in a professional stage play was at the age of three. In his childhood and as an adult he assisted his parents in the business end of their various theatrical ventures, including aiding his father in managing a chain of theaters that the family owned on the Pacific Coast of the United States which was based out of Fresno, California.

The Boston Globe stated that by the age of 10 Riggs was a "veteran actor" who had appeared in productions of Little Lord Fauntleroy and Ten Nights in a Barroom. In 1895 he appeared in California theaters in the title role of a stage adaptation of the children's novel Editha's Burglar by Frances Hodgson Burnett, and played the role of Oliver Twist in a stage version of the novel by Charles Dickens. In 1896 he appeared with his mother's company as Sam Willoughby in The Ticket-of-Leave Man. In the summer of 1898 he was appearing as a dancer and comedian in vaudeville in Texas in a program that included his mother and the actor and singer George Kunkel. Riggs performed at this time as a solo dancer, and in a comedy sketch that he performed in partnership with the actress Grace Bell.

Riggs resumed work in his mother's stock theatre troupe for performances in Oklahoma and New Mexico in the 1898–1899 season. Other plays he performed in with his mother's company included The Pink Dominos (1899), The Open Gate (1899), and Charley's Aunt (1899). In February 1900 the company organized performances in Albuquerque featuring contralto Sofia Scalchi at which time Ralph was listed alongside his mother as a co-manager of the company. The following summer, advertisements and newspaper reviews for the company in Las Vegas and Texas had it billed as the Riggs Stock Company, but with mainly the same performers including Rose Stillman whose name was no longer used. Plays in the company's repertoire at this time included Stanislaus Stange's Quo Vadis and Little Lord Fauntleroy.

By January 1901 the family theatre troupe was once again going by the name the Rose Stillman Stock Company for performances in Louisiana. Riggs's repertoire with the company in 1901 included Judge Lovelace in Justin Adams's T'riss; Or, Beyond the Rockies, Lord Bobberly (a.k.a. Charley's Aunt) in Charley's Aunt, Charles Shackleton in Jane, Tegillenus in Quo Vadis, and Duke Serge in The Clemenceau Case after the novel by Alexandre Dumas.

== Operetta baritone and comedian ==
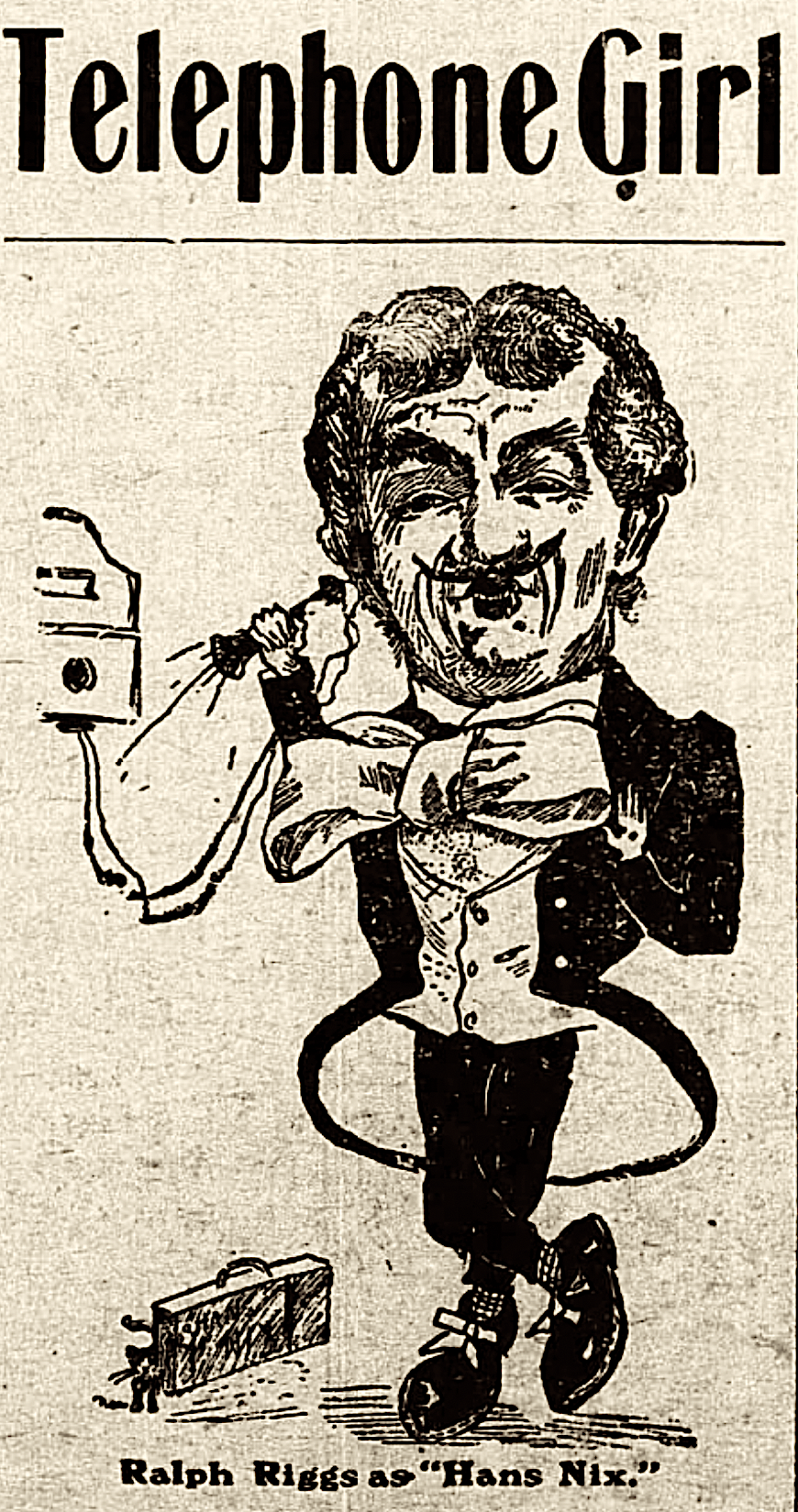
1904 advertisement for Ralph Riggs as Hans Nix in The Telephone Girl

By July 1902 Riggs had joined the Boston Ideal Opera Company (BIOC) with whom he first appeared as Knee-Ban in Gilbert and Sullivan's The Mikado. By the following September he was performing in that same opera with the Ed Andrews Opera Company (EAOC), but in the larger part of Pish Tash. Newspapers reported that he was a baritone with the company. Other roles he performed with the EAOC in 1902–1903 included Nocky in Richard Stahl and Scott Marble's Said Pasha, Giacomo in Daniel Auber's Fra Diavolo, the Sheriff in Friedrich von Flotow's Martha, the notary in Les cloches de Corneville, and Florestein in The Bohemian Girl. He rejoined the BIOC for their 1903 summer season in many of the same roles, and then resumed performing with the EAOC for the 1903–1904 season. This season included a new comic opera crafted by Andrews, Birds of a Feather, which featured Riggs's gifts as a dancer and comedian in the role of Sergeant Bonner.

In April 1904 Riggs joined a touring production of The Telephone Girl in which he played the role of Snuffles and his mother starred in the title role. By the following September he had taken over the part of Hans Nix in the production. In 1905 he resumed work with the EAOC, once again performing in Birds of a Feather and as Tweedlepunch in Florodora. He toured in the latter work in the latter part of 1906 in his own opera company, the Ralph Riggs Opera Company. In 1906 his opera company toured in productions of The Rajah of Altara with Riggs in the title role and Edmond Audran's La mascotte.

In the 1906–1907 season Riggs starred in a new musical, The College Boy, in a cast that included his future wife, Katherine Witchie whom he married in 1910. The cast was largely made up of Riggs's relatives which included his mother portraying the role of his character's wife in the production. All told he was related to eight of the ten cast members, another one of which was his brother, Bernard Riggs, in the role of the professor. A success, the family continued to tour the production in the 1907–1908 season, and the company continued to keep the work in rotation in the 1908–1909 season alongside The Bachelor and the Maid and It's All on the Quiet. Riggs and his wife then toured in Joseph E. Howard's musical Miss Nobody from Starland in 1910–1911. In this show Riggs portraying the lead male role of Preston Halliday opposite Olive Vail in the title part.

== Broadway and Witchie and Riggs ==
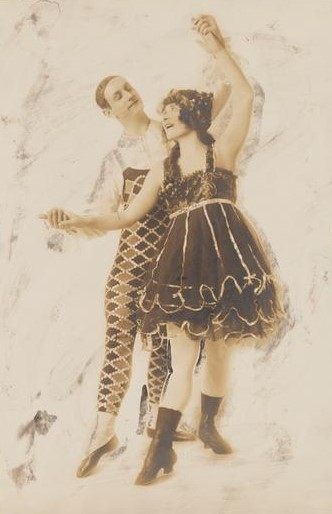
Ralph Riggs as Bertie Ashland and Katherine Witchie as Gabrielle Fourneaux in The Princess Pat

Riggs's 1951 obituary in New York Daily News stated that he made his Broadway debut in 1907 but did not name the role. Newspaper accounts from that year state that he starred in operetta revivals on the New York stage but did not provide further details. However, The New York Times stated in its published obituary on his wife that the couple made their Broadway debuts together in 1911 in Victor Herbert's The Enchantress. The couple performed together as a dance team known as Witchie and Riggs. They initially toured in vaudeville together in the Orpheum Circuit, before appearing together in several Broadway shows.

In The Enchantress Riggs portrayed the comedic role of Troute, the buffoonish head of the secret service, and Witchie portrayed Nina, the maid. They performed these roles in the premiere of the operetta at the National Theatre in Washington, D.C. on October 9, 1911, and remained with the production when it transferred to Broadway's New York Theatre later that month. They later toured nationally in these parts from January 1912 through March 1913, with the tour ending abruptly due to the impact of the Great Flood of 1913 which stranded the theatre company.

In June 1913 Riggs and Witchie returned to Broadway in the premiere of E. Ray Goetz's musical All Aboard at the Lew Fields' 44th Street Roof Garden on June 5, 1913. A work written as a starring vehicle for Lew Fields, Riggs portrayed the role of Mr. Ruff and was featured in the show singing the song "Captain Kidd" in addition to dancing with his wife who portrayed the part of Margot. For this show the couple invented a new dance which they called the "tango bolero" which blended steps from the Argentine tango and the Spanish bolero. After the production left Broadway they remained in the company for its 1913–1914 national tour.

In August 1915 Riggs and Witchie ended a period touring in vaudeville when they were cast in Victor Herbert and Henry Blossom's new operetta The Princess Pat. The operetta premiered at the Cort Theatre in Atlantic City on August 26, 1915, and then played at the Lyric Theatre in Philadelphia. It transferred to Broadway's Cort Theatre where it opened on September 29, 1915. It ran until February 12, 1916, with Riggs as Bertie Ashland and Witchie as Gabrielle Fourneaux. The couple had a featured dance, "Dance Divertisement", in the third act of the show. The New York Tribune reported in its review that the couple's dance was so well received that they repeated it multiple times due to the audience's demand for several encores. The couple toured North America in The Princess Pat after the end of its Broadway run in 1916.

In 1917 Riggs and Witchie were headliners in the Orpheum Circuit in an act titled "Dance Divertisements". The Oregonian review of their act compared Riggs favorably to Russian ballet dancer Vaslav Nijinsky. In the Autumn of 1917 the couple appeared at the Empire Theatre in London's West End and at theatres in the British provinces in Albert de Courville's revue Here and There. They continued to perform in that work in 1918 at the Hippodrome, London, the Liverpool Olympia, and in numerous UK theaters in the Moss Empires chain, including the Cardiff Empire in Wales, the Glasgow Empire Theatre in Scotland, the Empire Theatre in New Castle and the Empire Theatre in Birmingham. The Birmingham Post stated the following in its review:

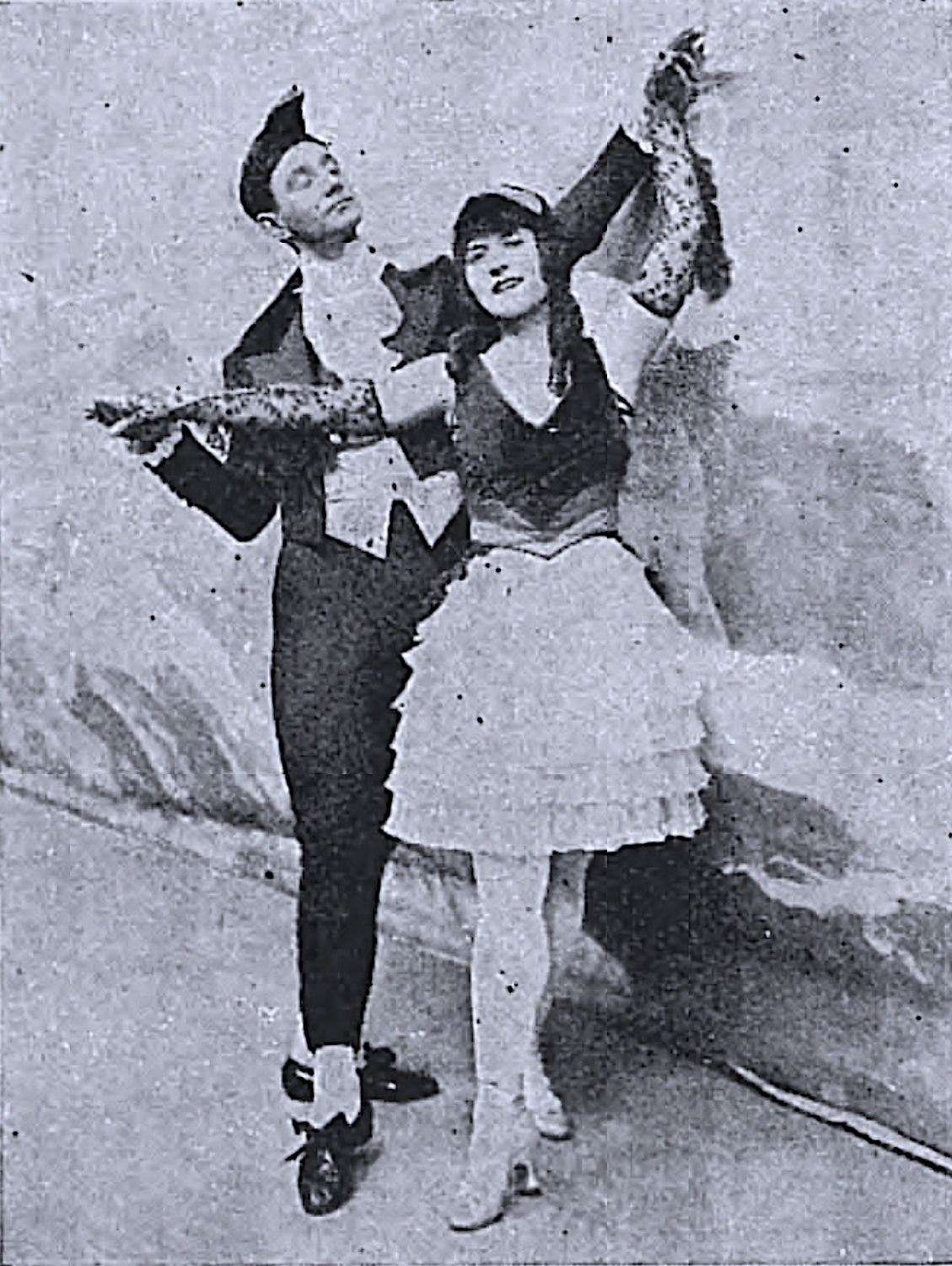
Witchie and Riggs in Here or There

"One which can not fail to give pleasure is contributed by the American dancers, Ralph Riggs and Catherine Witchie, whose dancing in Here and There at the Empire and subsequently at the Hippodrome has proved so successful in London. Their methods are novel and graceful, and deserve the warm commendation they receive."

In the summer of 1918 Witchie and Riggs were working in music halls in London in programs that also featured the comedians Joe O'Gorman and Wal Langtry. In August 1918 they were the headlining act at the Theatre Royal, Dublin in Ireland. They then went to Paris where they starred in the musical revue Ça Vaut Ça in 1918–1919, ultimately returning to the United States after the close of that show in the autumn of 1919. During their time in Europe they entertained American soldiers serving during World War I in hospitals and cantonments.

In 1919 Witchie and Riggs returned to Broadway in The Passing Show of 1919. Their featured dances in this revue included a "Salem witchcraft number, with an unusual lighting effect" and a "Chinese idol dance". After the Broadway production closed in June 1920, they remained with the show when it went on tour. During the run of the Passing Show, they also performed in a benefit concert for the Actors' Equity Association that was presented at the Metropolitan Opera House, an engagement they repeated in 1921 in which they performed in an "All-Star Dancing Group" whose other members included Clifton Webb, Dorothy Dickson, Hal Skelly, Louise Groody, and Adele and Fred Astaire. They also toured in vaudeville in their own shows, Inspirations (1920) and Dance Idylls (1921). When the latter work reached Boston's Keith's Theatre in May 1921 they shared headline billing with Julian Eltinge.

Witchie and Riggs also toured together in Gilbert and Sullivan operettas in the years following World War I. In 1922 they starred in a vaudeville revue produced by the Shubert brothers entitled The Midnight Revels whose cast also included Bayonne Whipple and Walter Huston. In 1923 they returned to Broadway in Rudolf Friml's musical Cinders at the Dresden Theatre. They next starred in Ed Wynn's musical revue The Grab Bag in the roles of the Dryad and the North Wind which premiered at the Apollo Theatre in Atlantic City, New Jersey prior to its Broadway run at the Globe Theatre in 1924–1925. They toured in the show after its Broadway run ended.

In October 1925 Witchie and Riggs were in the cast of the musical Oh You! by composer Milton Suskind and writers Benjamin Hapgood Burt and Paul Porter when it premiered at Poli's Theatre in Washington, DC with the intent of later moving to Broadway. However, by the time the production reached the New York stage under the title Florida Girl they were no longer in the show. They did return to Broadway in 1926 to perform in the revue at Nic Nax of 1926 at the Cort Theatre. Riggs served as choreographer for Robert Hood Bowers's 1927 Broadway musical Oh, Ernest!, a work based on Oscar Wilde's play The Importance of Being Earnest in which Witchie played the role of Martha and Riggs the role of James Lane.

Witchie and Riggs retired their duo act after the close of Oh, Ernest!. After 1927 Witchie rarely performed, but Riggs continued to work regularly as an actor and choreographer on his own. In 1930 they performed in and choreographed a production of Show Boat starring Irene Franklin which had a short run of just a week of performances in Brooklyn. In 1931 they performed in a variety show in that same city at Loew's 46th Street Theatre. In 1948 they co-directed Farmingdale High School's production of H. M. S. Pinafore.

== Later life and career ==
Riggs was a member of The Lambs and both performed in and choreographed several iterations of the Lambs' Gambols. He also choreographed Leon De Costa's 1925 Broadway musical Kosher Kitty Kelly and dances in De Costa's 1926 Broadway play The Blonde Sinner. In 1928 he portrayed Zingo in a touring production of Countess Maritza produced by the Shubert Brothers with Gladys Baxter in the title role. That same year he choreographed the musical The Queen's Taste (later re-titled Angela when it reached Broadway) starring Jeanette MacDonald.

Riggs portrayed The Chief Justice in both the original 1931 production and the 1933 Broadway revival of George and Ira Gershwin's Of Thee I Sing, a work which won the Pulitzer Prize for Drama. In 1934–1935 he portrayed Sam Weaver in the Broadway play The Farmer Takes a Wife at the 46th Street Theatre. He later appeared in the original Broadway casts of Louisiana Purchase (1941) and Oklahoma! (1943). In the latter work he portrayed the role of Judge Carnes for the show's first two years of performances. In 1937 he portrayed Ko-Ko in The Mikado at The Muny in St. Louis.

Riggs appeared in several musical short films in the 1930s and at the very end of his career appeared on American television from 1949 to 1951. His final stage appearance was in 1951 as Arvide Abernathy in the first national tour of Guys and Dolls. He died three weeks after leaving that tour in September 1951 at the age of 66.

Ralph Riggs died in New York City on September 16, 1951, at the age of 66. He is buried at St. Charles Cemetery in East Farmingdale, New York.

Riggs's nephew, Tommy Gavin, portrayed Piccolo in the 1936 Broadway production of White Horse Inn.
