= Louisiana Purchase (musical) =

Musical

- 1996 Cast Recording
- Music: Irving Berlin
- Lyrics: Irving Berlin
- Book: Morrie Ryskind
- Basis: A story Buddy De Sylva
- Productions: 1940 Broadway; 1941 Film; 1996 Broadway

Louisiana Purchase is a musical with music and lyrics by Irving Berlin and book by Morrie Ryskind based on a story by B. G. DeSylva. Set in New Orleans, the musical lightly satirises Louisiana Governor Huey Long and his control over Louisiana politics. An honest U.S. senator travels to Louisiana to investigate corruption in the Louisiana Purchase Company; the company's lawyer attempts to divert him via the attentions of two beautiful women, but the senator maintains his integrity and ends up marrying one of them. In 1941 it was adapted for the film Louisiana Purchase directed by Irving Cummings.

The show opened at the Shubert Brothers' Imperial Theatre, New York City on May 28, 1940 and ran for 444 performances. It was produced by Buddy De Sylva, who also wrote the story, and staged by Edgar MacGregor. The musical orchestrations were by Robert Emmett Dolan and N. Lang Van Cleve, with the ballets by George Balanchine and the musical staging and dances by Carl Randall. On June 19, 1996, a concert version with the complete score was recorded at Carnegie Hall (during four performances), including three additional songs cut from the original album.

== Songs ==
Act I

- The Letter - Sam Liebowitz
- Apologia - Secretary, Sam Liebowitz and Ensemble
- Sex Marches On - Jim Taylor, Col. Davis D. Davis Sr., Davis D. Davis Jr., Dean Manning and Police Captain Whitfield
- Louisiana Purchase - Beatrice, The Martins, the Buccaneers and Ensemble
- It's a Lovely Day Tomorrow - Madame Bordelaise
- Louisiana Purchase (Reprise) - Beatrice, Emmy-Lou, Lee Davis, The Martins and Ensemble
- Outside of That I Love You - Jim Taylor and Marina van Linden
- You're Lonely and I'm Lonely - Marina van Linden and Senator Oliver P. Loganberry
- (Dance with Me) Tonight at the Mardi Gras - The Martins

Act II

- Latins Know How - Madame Bordelaise and Ensemble
- What Chance Have I (with Love) - Senator Oliver P. Loganberry
- The Lord Done Fixed Up My Soul - Beatrice, Abner, the Buccaneers and Ensemble
- Fools Fall in Love - Jim Taylor and Marina van Linden
- Old Man's Darling - Young Man's Slave? - Marina van Linden, Spirit of Jim Taylor and Spirit of Senator Loganberry
- You Can't Brush Me Off - Emmy-Lou, Lee Davis and The Martins

== Casts ==
	Original Broadway (1940)	Film Adaptation (1941)	New York Concert (1996)
Jim Taylor	William Gaxton	Bob Hope	Michael McGrath
Marina van Linden	Vera Zorina		Judy Blazer
Senator Oliver P. Loganberry	Victor Moore		George S. Irving
Madame Yvonne Bordelaise	Irène Bordoni		Taina Elg
Emmy-Lou	April Ames	Phyllis Ruth	Alet Oury
Beatrice	Carol Bruce	Dona Drake	Debbie Gravitte
Alphonse	Charles La Torre		Keith Byron Kirk
Colonel Davis D. Davis Sr.	Robert Pitkin	Raymond Walburn	John Wylie
Colonel Davis D. Davis Jr.	Ray Mayer		Michael Morotta
Lee Davis	Nick Long Jr.		James Ludwig
Dean Joseph T. Manning	Ralph Riggs	Andrew Tombes	Merwin Goldsmith
Police Captain Whitfield	Edward H. Robins	Donald MacBride	Rick Crom
Sam Liebowitz	John Eliot	Emory Parnell	Merwin Goldsmith
Secretary	Georgia Carroll	Iris Meredith	Erin Dilly

== Adaptation ==
Musical Comedy Time presented a television adaptation of Louisiana Purchase on January 22, 1951, with Moore and Bordoni reprising their roles from the stage version.

== Sources ==
- Suskin, Steven (2000) "Showtunes", 3rd ed. Oxford University Press; ISBN 0-19-512599-1
