= Eleanor Painter Strong =

American opera singer (1885–1947)

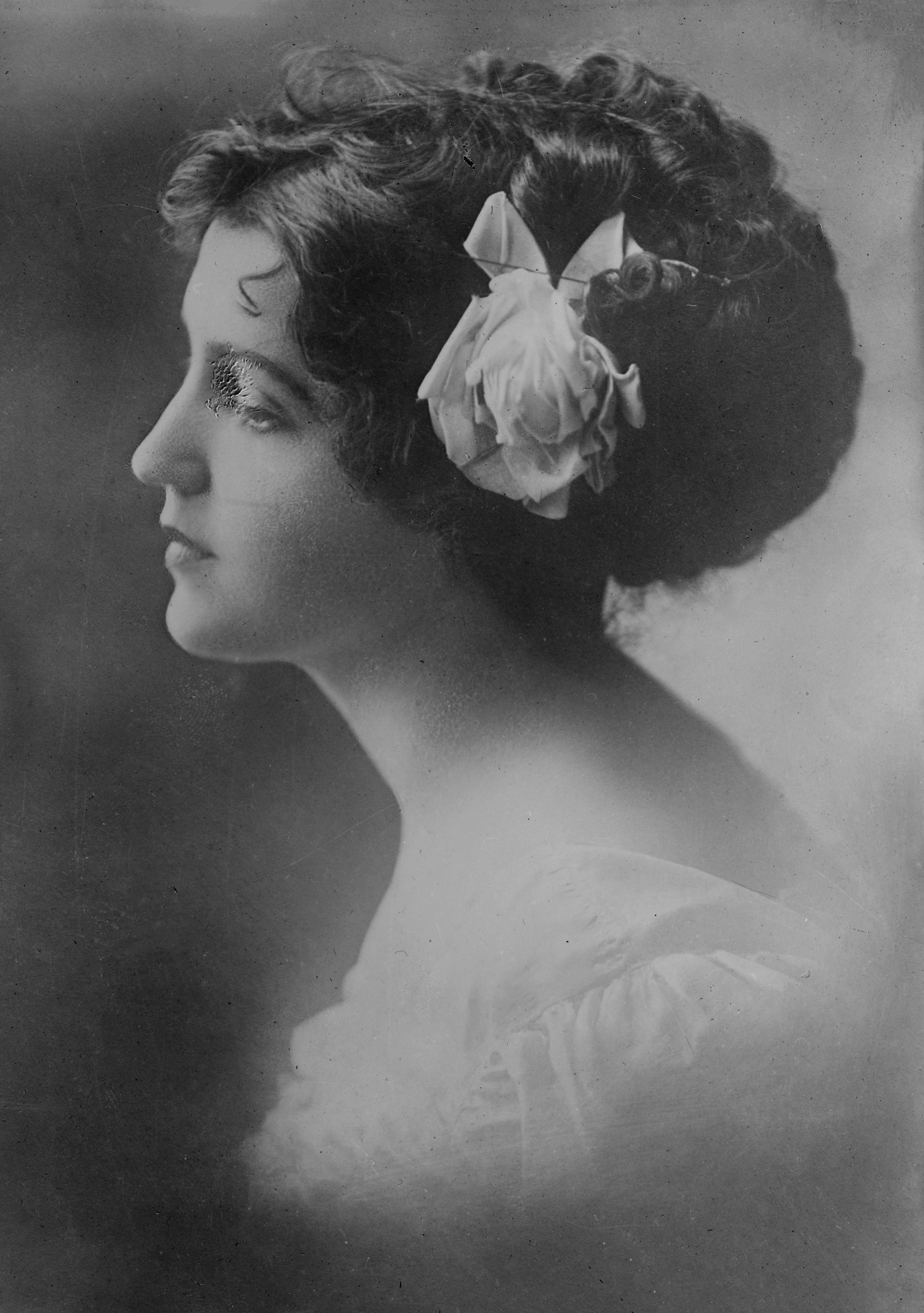
- Born: Eleanor Painter; September 12, 1885; Walkerville, Iowa, U.S.
- Died: November 3, 1947 (aged 62); Cleveland, Ohio, U.S.
- Spouse(s): Wilfred Douthitt; Charles Henry Strong

Eleanor Painter Strong (née Painter; September 12, 1885 – November 3, 1947) was an American opera singer.

== Early years and education ==
Strong was born in Walkerville, Iowa, as Eleanor Painter on September 12, 1885, to Mary Ellen and John Painter. She grew up in Colorado and later moved to Manhattan in New York City to pursue a singing career.

In 1912, she studied singing in Berlin, Germany.

== Career ==
Strong debuted at Covent Garden in London in 1913. She sang for five seasons with the Charlottenburg Opera in Berlin, interrupted by her roles in musicals. In New York City, between seasons in 1914, she starred in The Lilac Domino, and from 1915 to 1917, she starred as the title character in the operetta The Princess Pat, a role written for her by composer Victor Herbert.

Her operatic repertory included Madame Butterfly and Carmen, in New York City, Philadelphia, Pennsylvania, and Berlin. She also played in dramatic productions as well as musicals and operas. While in New York, she gave solo recitals accompanied by pianist Alice Marion Shaw.

== Marriages and death ==
She married English actor and singer Wilfred Douthitt, also known as Louis Graveure, a baritone, in New York in 1916. In 1931 she married Major Charles Henry Strong, a businessman from Cleveland, Ohio, and settled there with him.

Strong died on November 3, 1947, in Cleveland, Ohio.
