= Mabel Berra =

Mabel Berra (October 1, 1886 – December 28, 1928) was a vaudeville star in the early twentieth century who became known as the "Venus of Vaudeville". She was a comic singer who performed on tour and on Broadway. Her vaudeville act became popular when she was still in her teens.

== Personal life ==
Berra was born in Crestline, Ohio in 1886 and raised in Toledo, Ohio, the daughter of John Berra and Sarah "Sadie" Stiner. She married Charles Allen.

== Career ==
Berra debuted in Toledo in 1902 when she was sixteen years old and later appeared and toured throughout North America. In 2011 and 2012, she appeared on Broadway in The Enchantress. Later in 2012, she was the leading lady, Lulu Von Linden, in the Eternal Waltz, a Vienese operetta, which opened October 31, 1912, in Milwaukee, and then toured. She met her future husband, Charles, in 1913 during this show.

She toured twice in Europe, but she had to cancel her third European engagement, to star in operatic roles in Vienna, due to the outbreak of World War I. After this, she toured on the vaudeville circuits. At the height of her popularity, she earned $850 a week on the Keith vaudeville circuit.

== Death ==
On the afternoon of Saturday, December 28, 1928, Berra was walking her dog on Park Avenue in New York City when the dog ran into the street. While trying to retrieve her dog from the road, Berra was struck by a car and died at the age of 42. She is buried in Vermillion Cemetery in Hayesville, Ohio, along with her mother and sister, Dolly. Their graves are marked with a marble colonnade.
