= It's a Lovely Day Tomorrow =

1938 song written by Irving Berlin

"It's a Lovely Day Tomorrow" is a song written in 1938 by composer Irving Berlin.

== Background ==
The song came out of a conversation between songwriter Irving Berlin and British / Hungarian film producer Alexander Korda in a New York taxi cab in 1938. The Munich Agreement had just depressed both men. Korda asked Berlin if he had written a war song yet, and a few blocks later Berlin came up with the tune and lyrics.

It was first performed in London at the start of the war in 1939 before its American release, which caused a sensation at the time. Berlin used it in his 1940 musical Louisiana Purchase, in which it describes feelings of despair and hope during the American Great Depression, of the 1930s. Irene Bordoni performed the song on the opening night. In the film version of Louisiana Purchase in 1941, the song was performed by a black chorus.

== Memorable chorus ==
The song contains the following chorus by which it is popularly known.

It's a lovely day tomorrow
Tomorrow is a lovely day
Come and feast your tear dimmed eyes
On tomorrow's clear blue skies.
If today your heart is weary
If ev'ry little thing looks grey
Just forget your troubles and learn to say
Tomorrow is a lovely day.

== Recordings ==
- It was recorded by British artist Vera Lynn and promoted to lift spirits of British people during the darkest days of World War II and the Blitz. Other UK versions in 1940 were by Al Bowlly (HMV BD-828) and Denny Dennis (with Jay Wilbur And His Orchestra).
- In the USA, several artists put out recordings including Frank Sinatra who recorded it with the Tommy Dorsey Orchestra on April 23, 1940 (Victor 78: 26596).
- Even the Nazi propaganda swing band Charlie and his Orchestra recorded a straight (i.e., non-propaganda) version of the song in 1941 (PWX 0200).
- Mary Martin included the song on her album Mary Martin Sings for You (1949).

== In culture ==
- The song's title was used as the title of a made-for-TV film of 1975 called It's a Lovely Day Tomorrow, which is a drama documentary examining the Bethnal Green Disaster of 1943 in which 173 people were killed in a panic rush at the entrance to a bomb shelter, as well as being used as the title of an episode of the 1973 documentary series The World at War dealing with the Burma campaign.
- In the 1986 Australian film Death of a Soldier, serial killer Eddie Leonski (portrayed by American actor Reb Brown) sings a portion of the song while being questioned by military police.
- "A Lovely Day Tomorrow" was an entirely different song released as a one-off single from band British Sea Power in 2004 to celebrate the entry of Czech Republic into the European Union. The song deals with the assassination of Reinhard Heydrich by two Czechoslovak agents during World War II.
