= Bessie McCoy =

Irish-American singer (1888-1931)

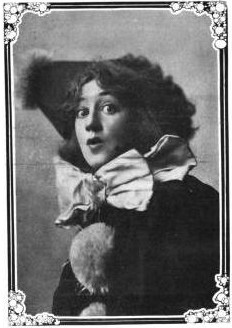
- Bessie McCoy in her Yama Yama Man outfit, 1908.
- Born: Elizabeth Genevieve McEvoy; May 17, 1888; New York City, U.S.
- Died: August 16, 1931 (aged 43); Bayonne, France
- Occupation(s): Singer, actress
- Spouse: Richard Harding Davis (m. 1912; died 1916)
- Children: 1

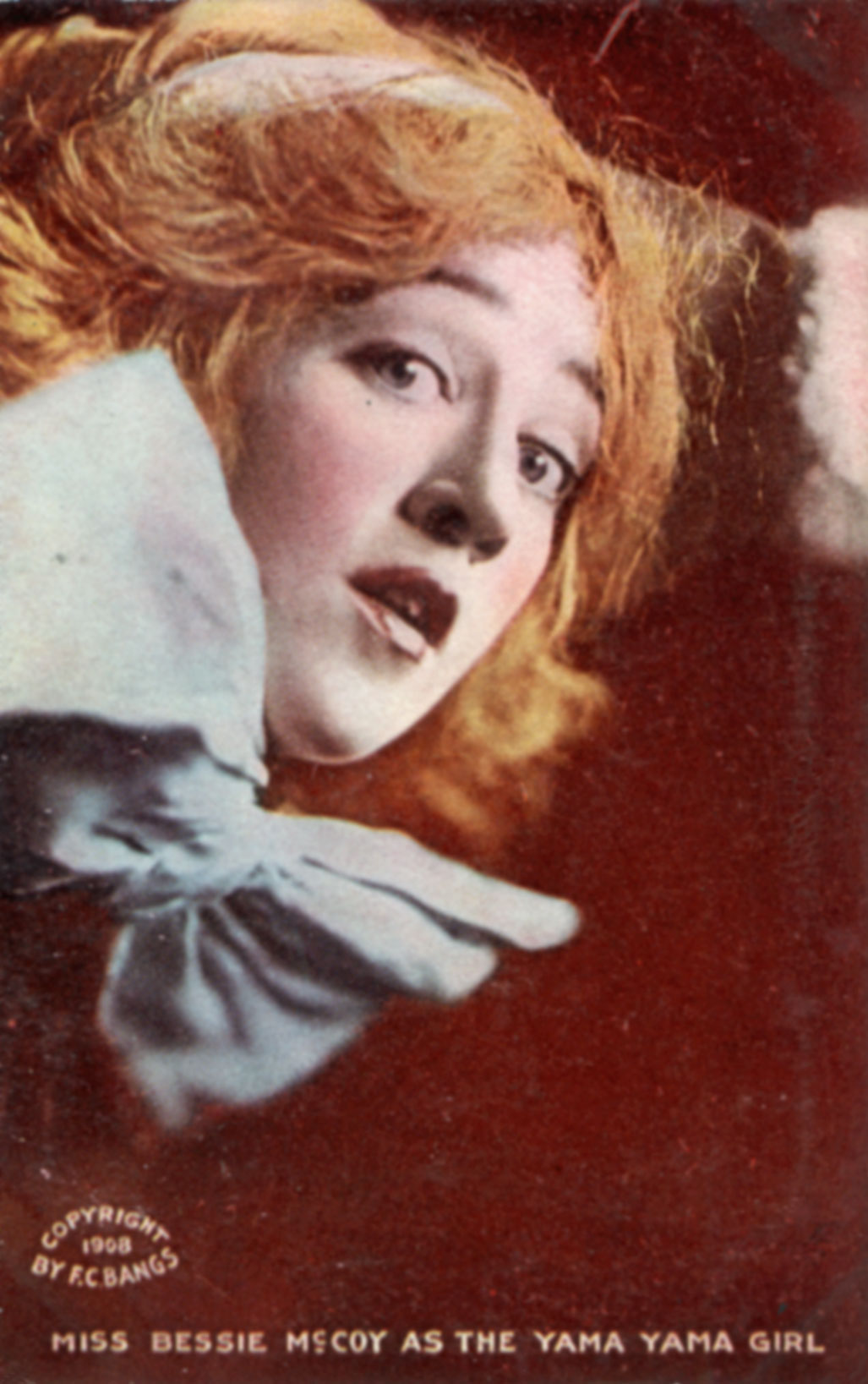
Bessie McCoy as Yama Yama Man, a comical bogeyman who is "ready to spring out at you unaware"

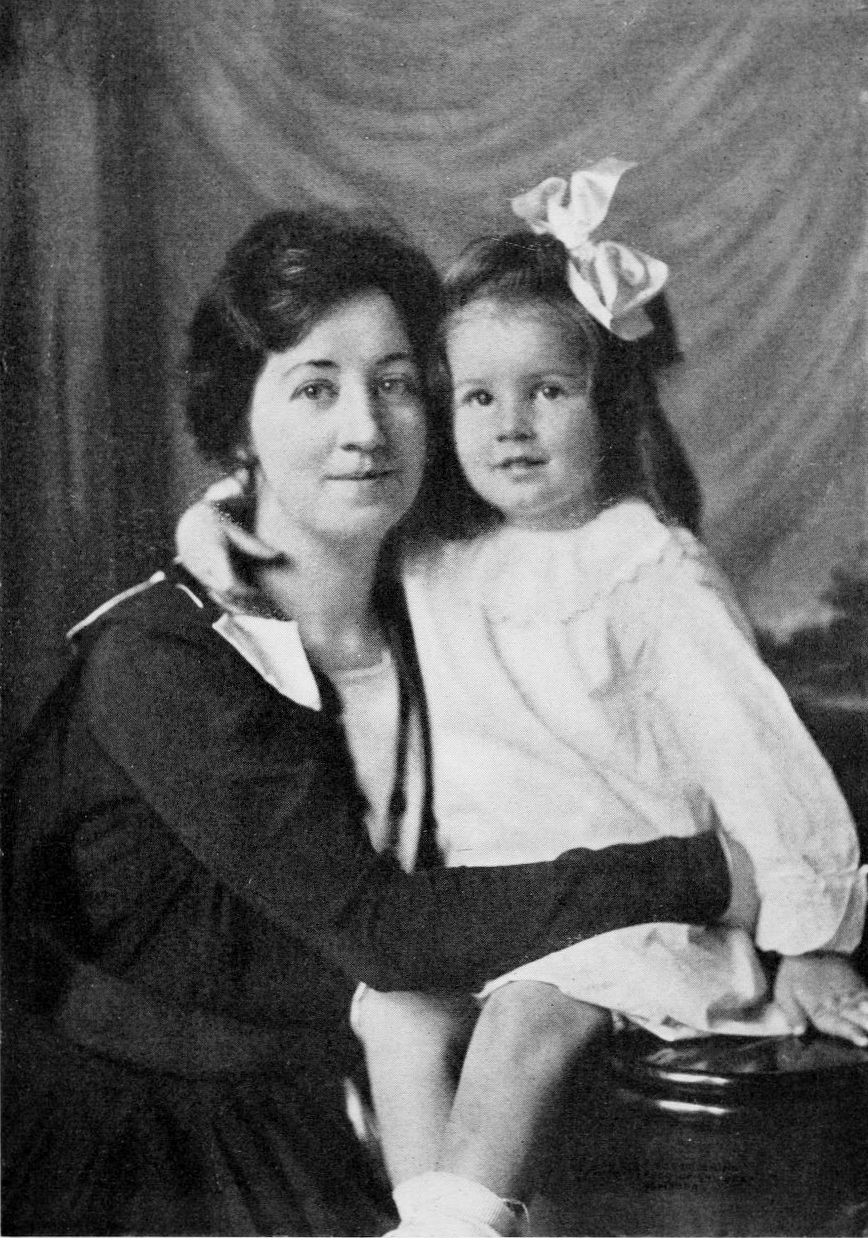
Bessie McCoy and daughter, Hope Davis, ca. 1917

Bessie McCoy (born Elizabeth Genevieve McEvoy; May 17, 1888 – August 16, 1931) was an American vaudeville entertainer, best known for her 1908 hit song and dance routine "The Yama Yama Man", for which she became known as "The Yama Yama Girl".

== Life and career ==
McCoy was born into an Irish immigrant family in New York City as Elizabeth McEvoy; most sources give the year as 1888 though census records suggest 1884. Her mother remarried, to Billy McCoy, and Bessie's mother and stepfather formed a vaudeville act known as McCoy and McEvoy, clog dancers. Bessie and her sister Nellie McCoy first performed on stage together in their teens as chorus girls.

After her sister became ill, Bessie continued as a solo performer. She appeared in a number of Broadway musicals and made a breakthrough in the play The Echo. She was given the "Yama Yama Man" song in the 1908 revue The Three Twins. She became famous for her lazy, husky singing while performing unusual acrobatic dance routines while dressed in a clown's pajama suit with a fool's cap topped by a puff ball. Nell Brinkley, who saw McCoy perform, described her thus:

She swings on her heel and leaps away into a wild fantastic headlong dance—the dance of a crazy king's clown, half girl, half wild boy, heady with the wine of the Spring air at twilight … The black satin of her bloomers fills like sails, and they ripple and flatten against her body. Her hair flies in loose flax around her face, and her face is a vivid white candle flame in the yellow aureole of her hair … Her feet might be bounding white balls carrying her body with them in their tireless, leaping flight. She circles madly around the boards, touching lightly and rebounding from the jutting points of the painted mock scenery, like an imprisoned moth, or an elf hunting for some lost thing and fearful of being caught. She is wonderful.

In 1910, she married war correspondent Richard Harding Davis. She retired from stage work and lived in the Davis' Connecticut estate. After her husband's early death in 1916 from a heart attack, she returned to theatre work and vaudeville as Bessie McCoy Davis, and starred in Miss 1917, and the 1919 and 1920 versions of The Greenwich Village Follies. She became ill in the 1920s, and retired with her daughter to France.

In 1931, she died suddenly in Bayonne, France, after an emergency intestinal operation.
