= Katherine Witchie =

American dancer

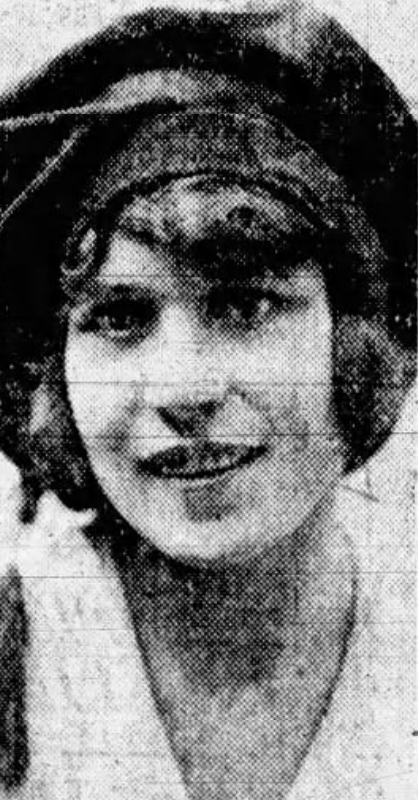
- Katherine Witchie, from a 1916 newspaper
- Born: March 4, 1884; Minneapolis, Minnesota, U.S.
- Died: April 19, 1967 (age 84); Babylon, New York, U.S.
- Other names: Katharine Witchie, Katherine Witchie Riggs
- Occupations: Dancer, writer, vaudeville performer

Katherine Witchie Riggs (March 4, 1884 – April 19, 1967) was an American dancer, singer, actress, writer, and vaudeville performer.

== Early life and education ==
Witchie was born in Minneapolis, Minnesota, the daughter of William Ferdinand Witchie and Mary Agnes Conroy Witchie. She was educated at the Academy of Holy Angels where she sang in the school's choir.

== Career ==
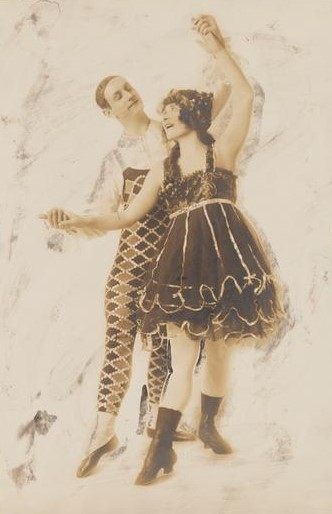
Ralph Riggs as Bertie Ashland and Katherine Witchie as Gabrielle Fourneaux in "The Princess Pat"

Witchie was a dancer in a duet act with her husband, Ralph Riggs; she also sang and acted on the stage. One of her earliest roles was as a Floradora girl in a company in Iowa. Her Broadway credits included appearances in The Enchantress (1911–1912), All Aboard (1913), The Princess Pat (1915–1916, an operetta by Victor Herbert), The Passing Show of 1919 (1919–1920), Cinders (1923), The Grab Bag (1924–1925), Nic Nax of 1926 (1926), and Oh, Ernest! (1927). She and her husband also performed as Riggs and Witchie on vaudeville bills and on the London stage. "This act should be a good closer in the family houses," noted a Billboard report in 1928.

Witchie wrote two one-act musical plays, The Garden and The Gipsy, and a screenplay, The Royal Waltz. In 1917 she danced on the radiator cap of a Hupmobile, as a publicity stunt.

== Personal life ==
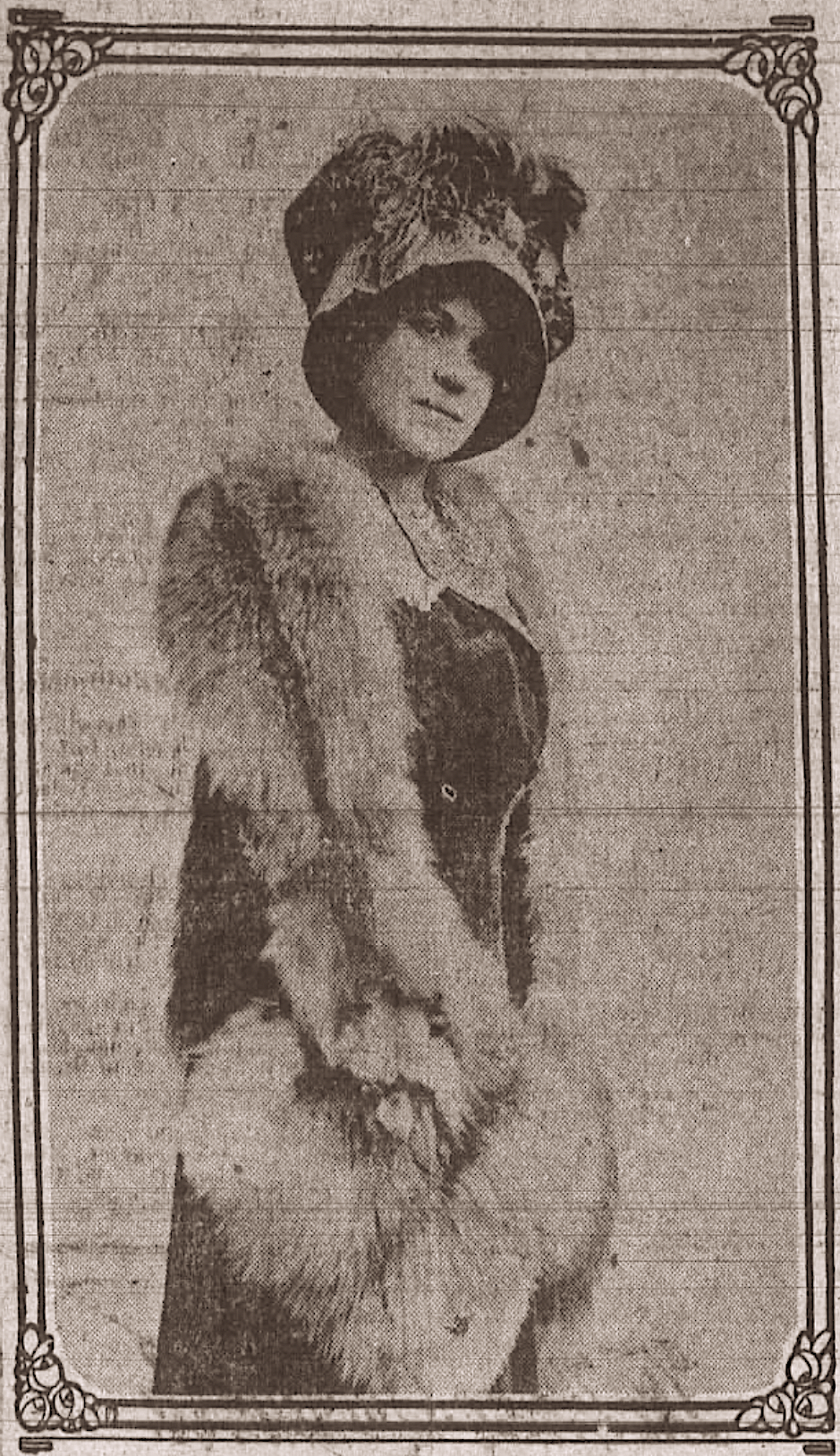
Katherine Witchie in 1913.

Witchie married actor and dancer Ralph Riggs in 1910. Her husband died in 1951, and she died in 1967, at the age of 83, at a nursing home in Babylon, New York.
