= The Princess Pat =

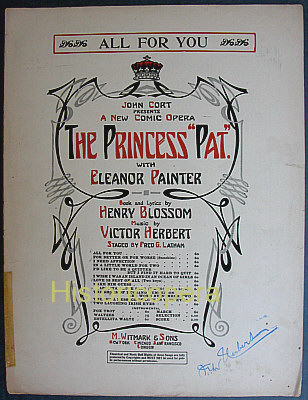
- Sheet music
- Music: Victor Herbert
- Lyrics: Henry Blossom
- Book: Henry Blossom
- Productions: 1915 Broadway

The Princess Pat is an operetta in three acts with music by Victor Herbert and book and lyrics by Henry Blossom. While set on Long Island, New York, the story follows the American born Princess di Montaldo, a.k.a. "Princess Pat" (formerly Patrice O'Connor), who is married to the Italian Prince Antonio di Montaldo, a.k.a. "Prince Toto". Unhappy that her husband ignores her, she is intent on winning back his attention and affections. Herbert wrote the piece as a vehicle for the soprano Eleanor Painter.

== Performance history ==
After an Atlantic City, New Jersey tryout in August 1915, The Princess Pat was scheduled to make its Broadway debut on September 27, 1915. However, the opening was postponed for two days when the actress Angela Palmer (born Pearl Foster), who was scheduled to perform the important ingenue role of Grace Holbrook, was murdered by her boyfriend on September 26. The producers quickly found and rehearsed the replacement for this role, Eva Fallon.

The Princess Pat premiered on Broadway on September 29, 1915, at the Cort Theatre, and ran for 158 performances; closing on February 12, 1916. The piece than toured across the country.

== Characters and original cast ==
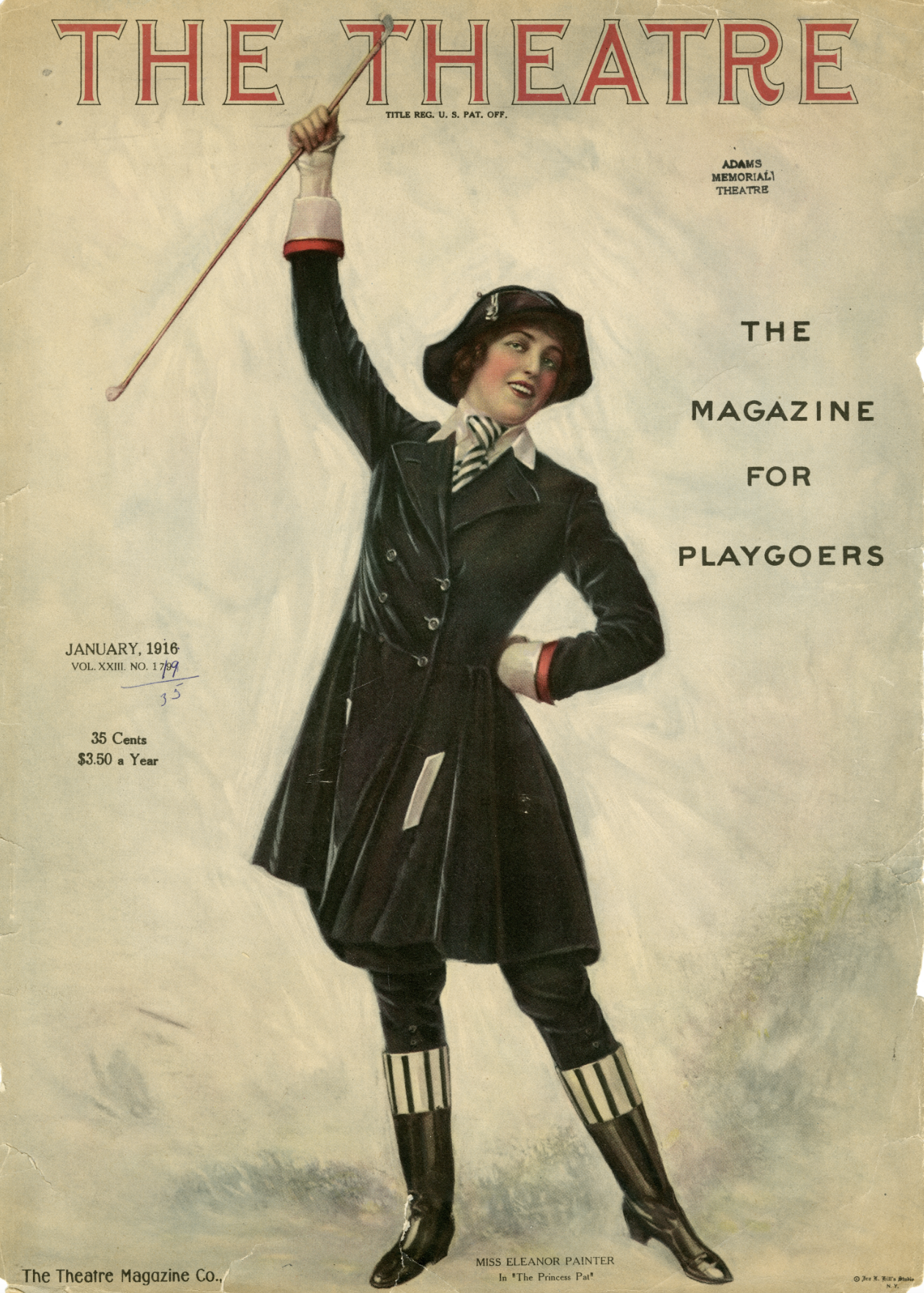
Eleanor Painter as Princess di Montaldo on the front cover of The Theatre Magazine in January 1916

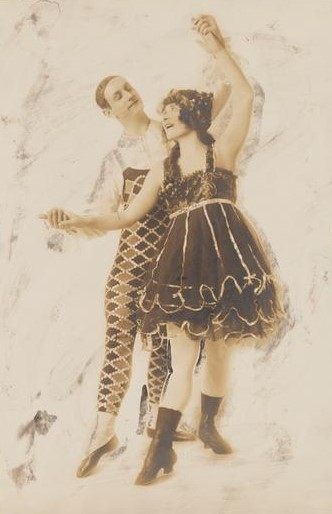
Riggs as Bertie and Witchie as Gabrielle

- Frances Hedges – Una Brooks
- General John Holbrook – Louis Casavant
- Maude Van Cortlandt – Lilian Charles
- Si Perkins – Alexander Clark
- Jack Wickham – William Collins
- Dorothy Pryme – Lyn Donaldson
- Lee Bainbridge – Carl Drury
- Duncan Arthur – Sven Eric
- Elsie Smith – Kathleen Erroll
- Grace Holbrook – Eva Fallon
- Nat Franklin – Irving Fast
- Anne Winthrop – Clare Freeman
- Sidney Gray – Jack Hagner
- Bob Darrow – Sam B. Hardy
- Thomas – Martin Hadyn
- Coralie Bliss – Doris Kenyon
- Bella Wells – Charlotte La Grande
- Prince Antonio di Montaldo – Joseph Lertora
- Reggie Calthorpe – Est Morrison
- Marie – Leonora Novasio
- Tony Schmalz, Jr. – Robert Ober
- Princess Patrice di Montaldo – Eleanor Painter
- Teddy Thorne – William Quinby
- Bertie Ashland – Ralph Riggs
- Achille Mazetti – Mario Rogati
- Anthony Schmalz – Al Shean
- Hester Lisle – Clara Taylor
- Gabrielle Fourneaux – Katherine Witchie

== Synopsis ==
Setting: Long Island, New York

It is spring 1915. Princess Patrice de Montaldo (O'Connor), an Irish-American, is married to the Italian Prince Antonio "Toto" di Montaldo. The Prince is unattentive and possessive, now that the couple has married. Pat loves her husband but was unhappy living in Sicily where she was homesick for her Easthampton, Long Island home, and her beloved dogs and horses. The two have moved to her estate, but the Prince is unhappy there. Meanwhile, aging, wealthy, widowed, German womanizer Anthony Schmalz has become engaged to Pat's young friend Grace Holbrook, because Grace's uncle, the befuddled General John Holbrook, has recently lost his fortune.

Assisted by New Yorker Bob Darrow, Pat comes up with a plan to make her husband jealous: she pretends to elope with Schmalz. The scheme works well: the Prince's passion is revived. At the same time, Bob's friend, Schmalz's loafing but handsome Yale-educated son Tony, needs a spirited woman to set him straight, and the plot proves to Grace that Schmalz, Sr. is a philanderer; she decides to marry the younger and more suitable Tony Jr. A bumbling sheriff, Si Perkins, pursues Tony and Bob to arrest Bob for speeding.

== Song list ==
- Allies – Marie and Thomas
- Make Him Guess – Grace and Ladies
- I'd Like to Be a Quitter, But I Find It Hard to Quit – Tony Schmalz, Jr.
- Love Is the Best of All – Princess de Montaldo and Ensemble
- For Better or For Worse (Sunshine) – Princess de Montaldo and Grace
- When a Girl's About to Marry – Grace, General John Holbrook and Anthony Schmalz
- Estellita – Ensemble
- Neapolitan Love Song (T'amo!) – Prince Antonio di Montaldo
- I Wish I Was an Island in an Ocean of Girls – Anthony Schmalz and Girls
- I Need Affection – Princess de Montaldo
- All for You – Princess de Montaldo and Prince Antonio di Montaldo
- In a Little World for Two – Princess de Montaldo, Bob Darrow, Grace and Tony Schmalz, Jr.
- The Shoes of Husband Number One Are Worn by Number Two – Si Perkins
- Two Laughing Irish Eyes – Ensemble
