= All Aboard (musical) =

Broadway musical premiered on 1913

All Aboard is a musical in two acts and ten scenes with lyrics by E. Ray Goetz, music by composers E. Ray Goetz and Malvin M. Franklin, and a book by Mark Swan. The work also features additional songs written by composers Irving Berlin, Jack Glogau and Joaquin Valverde; and lyricists Irving Berlin and Earl Carroll.

All Aboard premiered on Broadway at Lew Fields' 44th Street Roof Garden on June 5, 1913. It closed on September 6, 1913, after 108 performances. The production was produced by Lew Fields who also portrayed the roles of Jan Van Haan and Harold Hargreaves in the show. The musical was co-directed by William J. Wilson and William H. Post. The costumes were designed by Melville Ellis, the sets were designed by H. Robert Law, and the lighting was designed by David Atchison. Other members of the cast included Zoe Barnett as both Marime Sinkavitch and Florence DeForrest, Carter DeHaven as Dick Cyril Mahoney, Flora Parker DeHaven as Mary, Dolly Connolly as Tillie Whiteway, the drag performer George W. Monroe as both Nancy Lee and Boss Mahoney, Nellie DeGrasse as Nellie, Marcia Harris as Mrs. Van Haan, Nat Fields as Hook, Stephen Maley as Mr. Smooth, Venita Fitzhugh as Alice Brown, Arthur Hartley as Mr. Scoot, Natalie Holt as Carmen, Katherine Witchie as Margot, and Lawrence D'Orsay as the Captain of the ship.

== Song list ==
Act 1

- All Aboard - Chorus
- Good-Bye, Poor Old Manhattan - Tillie Whiteway and Chorus
- Monkey Doodle (music and lyrics by Irving Berlin) - Russell and Chorus
- Mr. Broadway, U.S.A. - Dick and Chorus
- Captain Kidd - Mr. Ruff and Chorus
- Over the Ocean - Alice Brown and Male Chorus
- Honey You Were Made for Me (music by Jack Glogau; lyrics by Earl Carroll) - Dick and Mary
- Serafina (music by Joaquin Valverde) - Florence DeForrest, Mr. Scoot and Chorus
- Ragtime Yodeling Man - Russell and Chorus

Act 2

- Tulip Time - Alice Brown and Chorus
- In a Garden of Eden for Two (music by E. Ray Goetz) - Dick and Mary
- Love Is Just the Same Old Game (In Every Land) - Mary and Chorus
- (My) Cubist Girl - Mr. Ruff, Margot, Carmen and Models
- Under the China Moon (music by E. Ray Goetz) - Florence DeForrest and Chorus
