= Nellie McCoy =

American actress

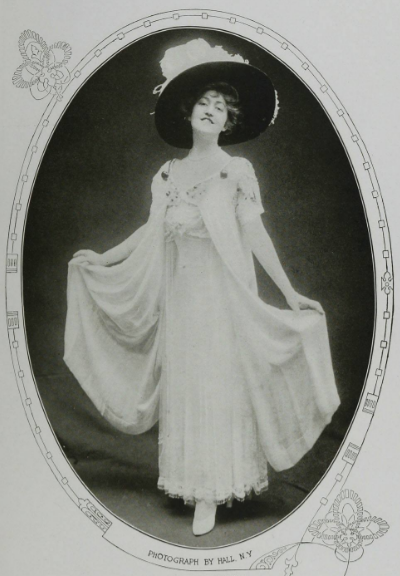
- McCoy c. 1910
- Born: July 12, 1883; Baltimore, Maryland, U.S.
- Died: February 7, 1961 (aged 77); Ellsworth, Kansas, U.S.
- Occupation: Actress
- Years active: 1897–1913
- Notable work: The Earl and the Girl; The Silver Star; The Enchantress

Nellie McCoy (July 12, 1883 – February 7, 1961) was an American vaudeville and theater actress from the 1890s through the 1910s. Born into a performing family, McCoy and her sister, Bessie McCoy, were engaged in circus and theater performances from a young age, though they had to travel throughout the country and eventually internationally due to harassment from the Gerry Society. After they started performing together as adults, it was suggested by Sam S. Shubert that they begin acting separately to build up their own individual notoriety.

McCoy's dancing and singing capabilities were frequently commented on by newspapers, though she received additional attention in two separate incidents where the stress of her performances led to mental breakdowns that resulted in hospitalization both times. She later went into vaudeville performances and became well known for her roles in plays such as The Earl and the Girl, The Silver Star, and The Enchantress.

== Early life and childhood ==
Born in Baltimore to a pair of circus performers, she and her sister, Bessie McCoy, were raised in a family trained in dramatics, particularly after their mother became a character actress. McCoy began starring with her parents in child roles starting at four years old, with her first impromptu performance being running onto the circus stage and re-enacting the ringmaster's actions in a more childlike way. The audience, applause, however, scared her and she ran away to her mother, saying in a 1911 interview that it was the "first and last time I ever ran away from applause".

Her later young performances ended up being accosted by the Gerry Society while starring in A Trip to Chinatown with her sister as child dancers when she was eleven. This resulted in her family moving away from New York and joining the Russell Comedians. As the family continued their travels and performances, the sisters also spent a year in London and a year in Australia, with several years of general schooling in between.

== Career ==
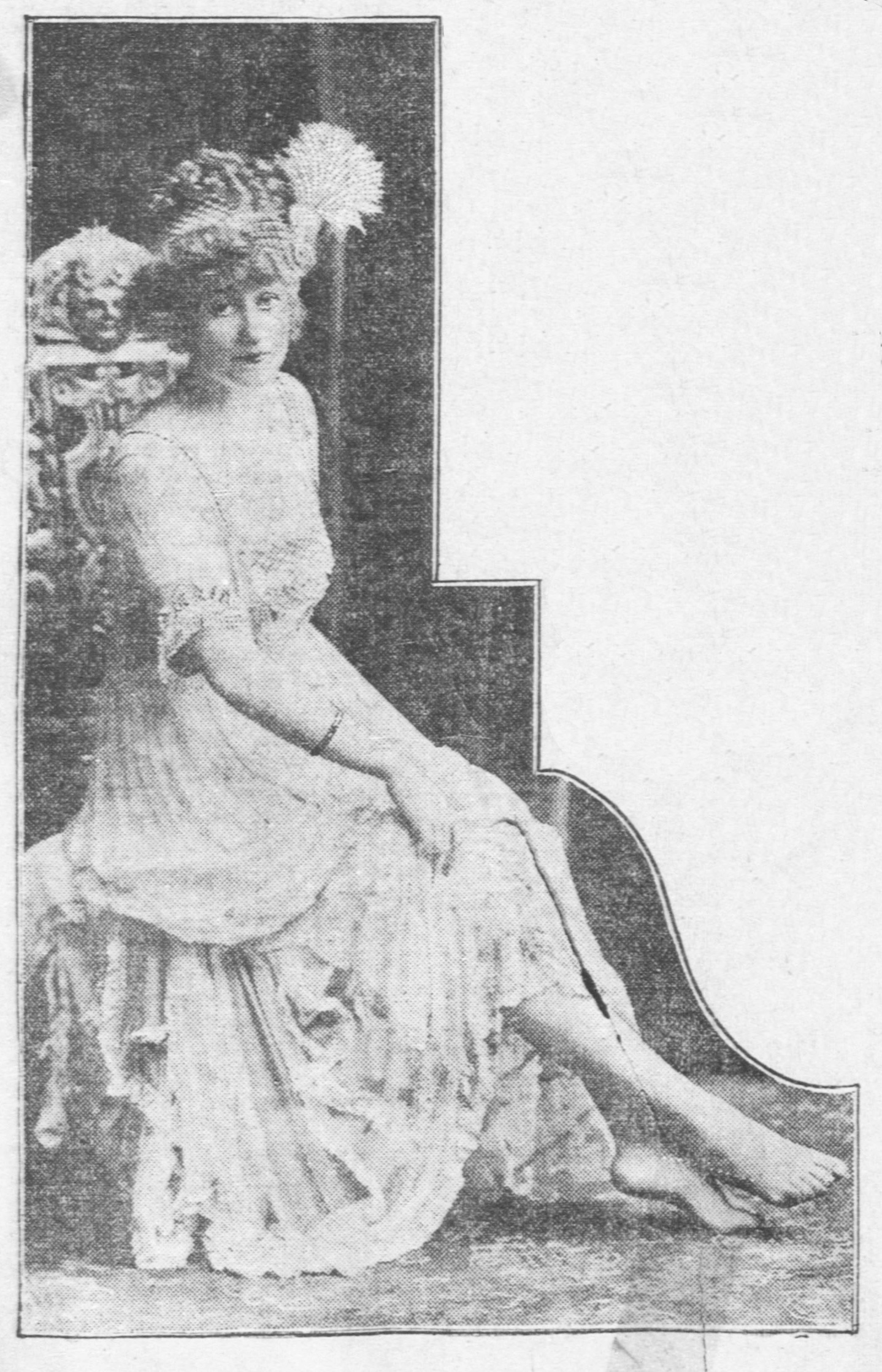
McCoy in 1912 advertisement

The sisters signed to the company Wober & Fields in 1903 and began performing in stage productions by dramatist Charles H. Hoyt that were organized by Sam S. Shubert. Shubert suggested they perform in future plays separately to boost their individual popularity, which they both agreed to. They began performing in their own plays starting in 1905. During the 1905 production of The Earl and the Girl, McCoy's role involves a "drunken song" and moving through a series of silk hats, a scene that the Virginian-Pilot stated was "worth the price of admission". Her dancing was also described by the Boston Evening Transcript as "one of the most delightful and popular features of the show".

Later performances of the show in 1905 had McCoy feel that the audience was not appreciating her performance, leading to her suffering a mental breakdown and her violent response resulted in her being committed to the Bellevue Hospital. After being assessed by doctors as needing extended rest, she was moved to a private sanatorium in Riverdale, California. She had recovered by the beginning of the following year and returned to the production of The Earl and the Girl. A ballad was written for her by Arthur Sherman and H.A. Hardy titled "Coy Nellie McCoy" and she eventually introduced it into her performance for the ongoing play production.

In August 1906, McCoy was made the featured entertainment at the Keith & Proctor's 23rd Street Theatre, with music she obtained from her work in European theatre. At the same time, she returned to the new run of The Earl and the Girl in the same role she had previously. But the strain of the work resulted in her suffering another nervous breakdown in November 1906 and being hospitalized for two weeks. She was then taken home by her mother to New York City. The beginning of 1910 saw McCoy begin a five week series of vaudeville appearances, expanding her involvement in the alternative style of theatre. Her performances included dancing, but also multiple song renditions.

The Washington Evening Star discussed McCoy's role in 1911's The Enchantress, noting that while her role had nothing to do with the ongoing story of the play, she "justified her presence" with her dancing and the "dashing charm of her performance". Compared to other dancers, the natural form she used exemplified her personal style that was heightened by "little touches of humorous pantomime" that are constantly drawn from her "inexhaustible store of exuberance". During the tour of the production, she also visited a number of dance halls in each city they stopped in in order to learn new dance techniques that were being developed rather than those that are "history-old, and history-worn". She also created special props for her role, such as an artificial rose made of satin that had three different forms throughout the play.

== Theatre ==
- A Trip to Chinatown
- A Stranger in New York (1897) as Kittie Winns
- The Night of the Fourth (1901)
- Liberty Belles (1902) as Mildred Ross
- Medal and the Maid
- M'mselle Napoleon
- Fantana (1904)
- Lady Teazle (1904) as Dancing Girl
- The Earl and the Girl (1905) as Daisy Fallowfield
- A Night in a London Music Hall (1908)
- The Silver Star (1909)
- The Echo (1910)
- The Enchantress (1911) as Marion Love
- Sweethearts (1913) as Lizette

== Personal life ==
In 1912, during the production of The Enchantress, leather goods heir George F. Finck Jr. asked McCoy to marry him. It turned out, however, that he had major money troubles, including having "borrowed" the car he had been using to drive McCoy around. She accepted, but he later reneged. In response, she sued him for US$25,000 (equivalent to $791,787.88 in 2024) in a breach of promise suit in October 1913.
