= Her First Affaire (film) =

1932 film

- Directed by: Allan Dwan
- Written by: Dion Titheradge; Brock Williams
- Based on: Her First Affaire by Merrill Rogers and Frederick J. Jackson
- Produced by: Frank Richardson
- Starring: Ida Lupino; George Curzon; Diana Napier
- Cinematography: Geoffrey Faithfull
- Edited by: John Seabourne Sr.
- Production company: St. George's Pictures
- Distributed by: Sterling Films
- Release date: 7 December 1932
- Running time: 71 minutes
- Country: United Kingdom
- Language: English

Her First Affaire is a 1932 British drama film directed by Allan Dwan and starring Ida Lupino, George Curzon, and Diana Napier. It was based on Frederick J. Jackson's 1930 version of Merrill Rogers' original 1927 play of the same name. Jackson modified the story significantly for the London stage and received a shared co-author credit for his version. The film was shot at Teddington Studios with sets designed by the art director J. Elder Wills.

== Plot ==
A headstrong young girl falls completely for a writer of trashy novels and insinuates herself into his household, all to the chagrin of her erstwhile fiancé. He conspires with the author's wife to show the girl how foolish she has been.

== Cast ==
- Ida Lupino as Anne
- George Curzon as Carey Merton
- Diana Napier as Mrs Merton
- Harry Tate as Major Gore
- Muriel Aked as Agatha Brent
- Arnold Riches as Brian
- Kenneth Kove as Professor Hotspur
- Helen Haye as Lady Bragden
- Roland Culver as Drunk
- Melville Gideon as Melville Gideon

== Bibliography ==
- Goble, Alan. The Complete Index to Literary Sources in Film. Walter de Gruyter, 1999.
