= Money Isn't Everything =

Money Isn't Everything may refer to:

- Money Isn't Everything (1925 film), a British silent romance film
- Money Isn't Everything (1918 film), a silent dramady feature film
- Dreaming Out Loud (film), also known as Money Isn't Everything, a 1940 American film
- "Money Isn't Everything" (The Gilded Age), an episode of the TV series The Gilded Age
- "Money Isn't Everything", a song by the Streets from the album The Darker the Shadow the Brighter the Light
- "Money Isn't Everything", a song from the Rodgers and Hammerstein musical Allegro
