= High Speed (1924 film) =

1924 film

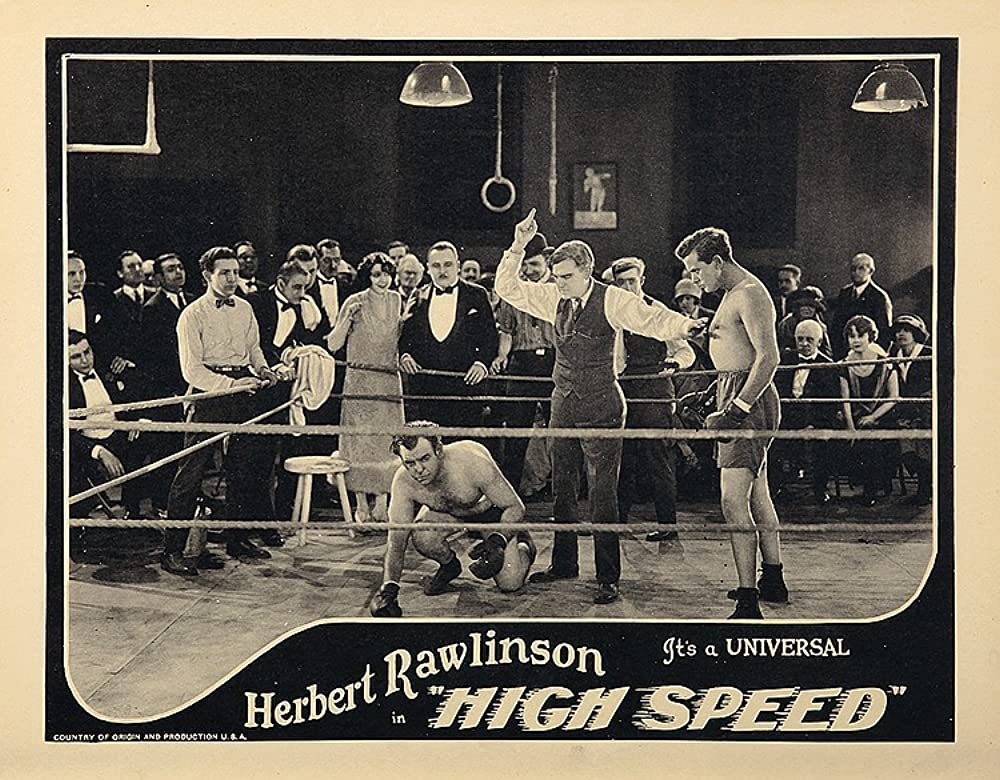
- Directed by: Herbert Blaché
- Written by: Helen Broderick; Frederick J. Jackson
- Produced by: Carl Laemmle
- Starring: Herbert Rawlinson; Carmelita Geraghty; Bert Roach
- Cinematography: Merritt B. Gerstad
- Production company: Universal Pictures
- Distributed by: Universal Pictures
- Release date: May 20, 1924
- Running time: 50 minutes
- Country: United States
- Languages: Silent; English intertitles

High Speed is a 1924 American silent comedy film directed by Herbert Blaché and starring Herbert Rawlinson, Carmelita Geraghty and Bert Roach.

== Synopsis ==
Hi Moreland attempts to win the hand of Marjory, the daughter of a bank president, in the face of stiff competition from a wealthy rival whom her father prefers. Eventually, he evades her father's wishes and beats his wealthy opponent to become her husband.

== Cast ==
- Herbert Rawlinson as Hi Moreland
- Carmelita Geraghty as Marjory Holbrook
- Bert Roach as Dick Farrell
- Otto Hoffman as Daniel Holbrook
- Percy Challenger as Rev. Percy Humphries
- Jules Cowles as Burglar
- Cleo Bartlett as Susanna
- Buck Russellas Taxi Driver
- Helen Broderick as Minor role

== Bibliography ==
- Connelly, Robert B. The Silents: Silent Feature Films, 1910-36, Volume 40, Issue 2. December Press, 1998.
- Munden, Kenneth White. The American Film Institute Catalog of Motion Pictures Produced in the United States, Part 1. University of California Press, 1997.
