= Let's Elope (film) =

1919 film by John S. Robertson

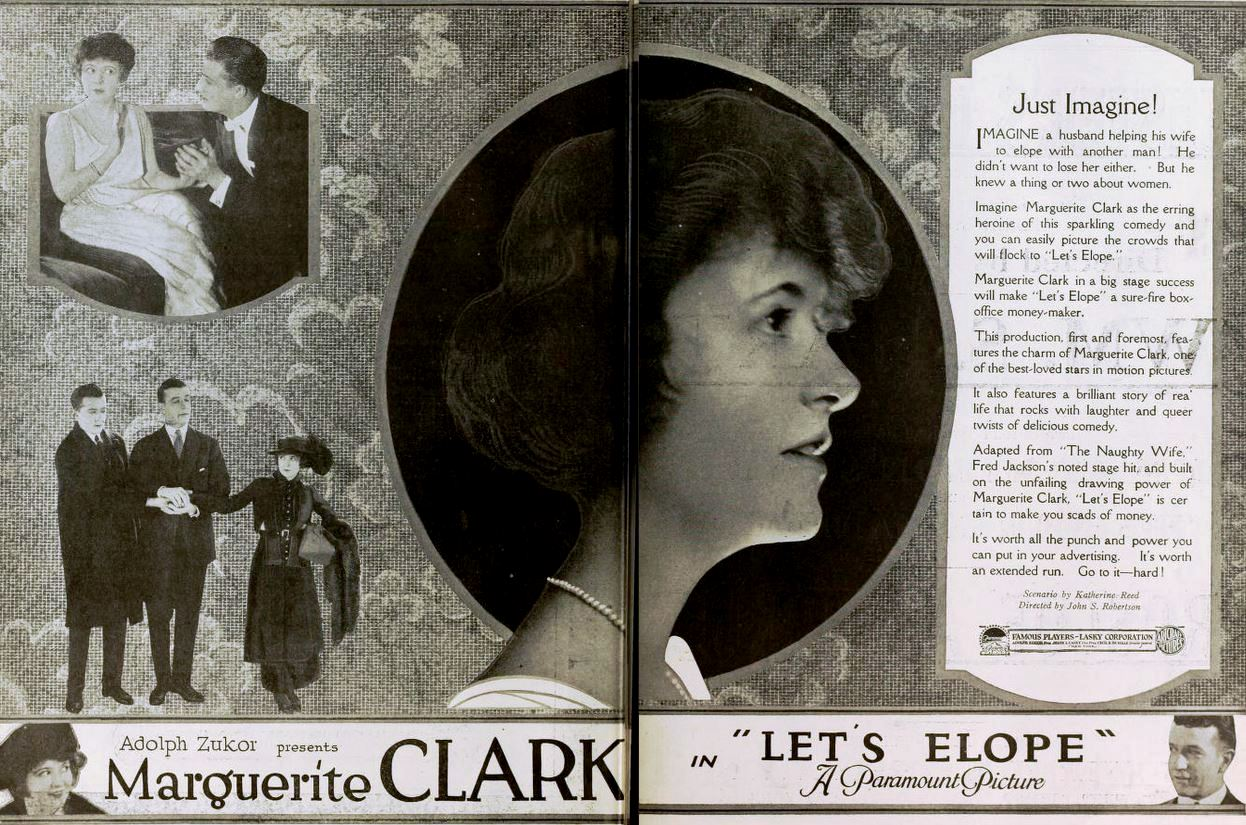
- Advertisement for film
- Directed by: John S. Robertson
- Written by: Katherine S. Reed (screenplay)
- Based on: The Naughty Wife by Frederick J. Jackson
- Produced by: Adolph Zukor; Jesse Lasky
- Starring: Marguerite Clark
- Cinematography: Hal Young
- Distributed by: Paramount Pictures
- Release date: April 23, 1919
- Running time: 5 reels
- Country: United States
- Language: Silent (English intertitles)

Let's Elope is a lost 1919 American silent comedy film starring Marguerite Clark and directed by John S. Robertson. It was produced by Famous Players–Lasky and released through Paramount Pictures. The film is based on The Naughty Wife by Frederick J. Jackson.

== Plot ==
As described in a film magazine, author Hilary Farrington is pressed by his publishers and confines himself to his work so closely that his wife Eloise feels herself neglected. Darrell McKnight, free verse devotee, breaks his engagement to Nora Gail and implores Eloise to elope with him. She pretends to agree, meaning to thus bring her husband to the realization of his neglect. Hilary is incredulous but Nora guesses the plan and the two then conspire to bring their respective loved ones back into the fold by seeming to do everything in their power to aid them in eloping. The complications which ensue are many and varied, but Eloise finally grasps the significance of their plans, summons her uncle who is a bishop, gets Nora married to Darrell, and goes on a second honeymoon with her husband.

== Cast ==
- Marguerite Clark as Eloise Farrington
- Frank R. Mills as Hilary Farrington (*this Frank Mills, stage star born 1870 died 1921)
- Gaston Glass as Darrell McKnight
- Helen Greene as Nora Gail
- Blanche Standing as Maid
- George Stevens as Butler
- A. H. Busby as Bishop

== See More ==
List of lost films
