= Her First Affaire =

Her First Affaire is a play in three acts. Existing in two different versions, the original play was authored by Merrill Rogers and premiered on Broadway in 1927. The play was reworked for its United Kingdom staging in 1930 by playwright Frederick Jackson, and both Jackson and Rogers were credited as authors for this second version of the play which premiered at the Lewisham Hippodrome in 1930. This second version was the basis for the 1932 film Her First Affaire.

== Performance history ==
Her First Affaire premiered on Broadway at the Nora Bayes Theatre on August 22, 1927. The play had its United Kingdom debut at the Lewisham Hippodrome on August 4, 1930. The play then moved to the Kingsway Theatre in London on September 11, 1930, where it ran through October 14, 1930. The production then transferred to the West End where it played at the Duke of York's Theatre from October 15, 1930, through January 24, 1931; closing after 160 performances. The Uk production starred Henry Charles Hewitt as Cary Maxon.
