= The Lone Chance =

1924 film

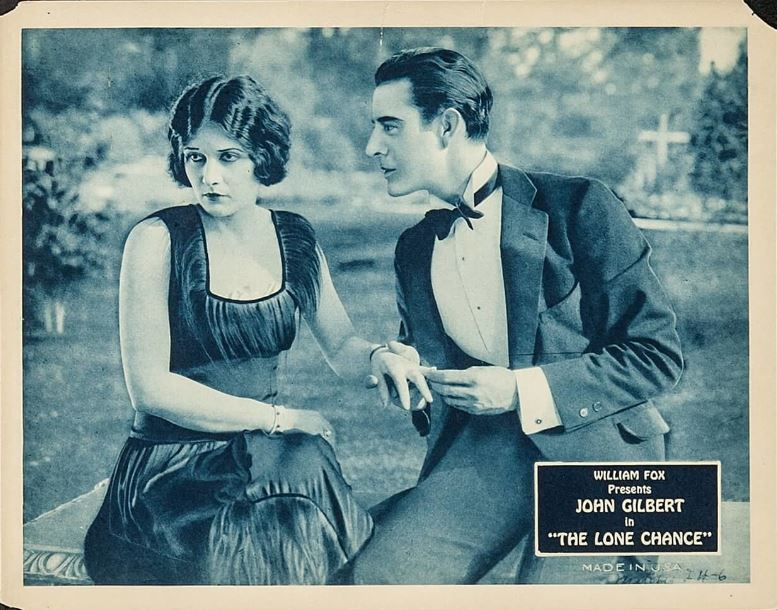
- Film poster
- Directed by: Howard M. Mitchell
- Written by: Charles Kenyon
- Based on: Frederick Jackson's short story The Lone Chance
- Starring: Evelyn Brent
- Cinematography: Bert Baldridge
- Distributed by: Fox Film Corporation
- Release date: May 18, 1924
- Running time: 50 minutes
- Country: United States
- Language: Silent with English intertitles

The Lone Chance was a 1924 silent American drama film directed by Howard M. Mitchell and starring Evelyn Brent. The film is now considered lost.

== Cast ==
- John Gilbert as Jack Saunders
- Evelyn Brent as Margaret West
- John Miljan as Lew Brody
- Edwin Booth Tilton as Governor
- Harry Todd as Burke
- Frank Beal as Warden
