= Theatre Royal, Brighton =

Theatre in England

Coordinates: 50°49′24″N 0°08′22″W

Theatre Royal
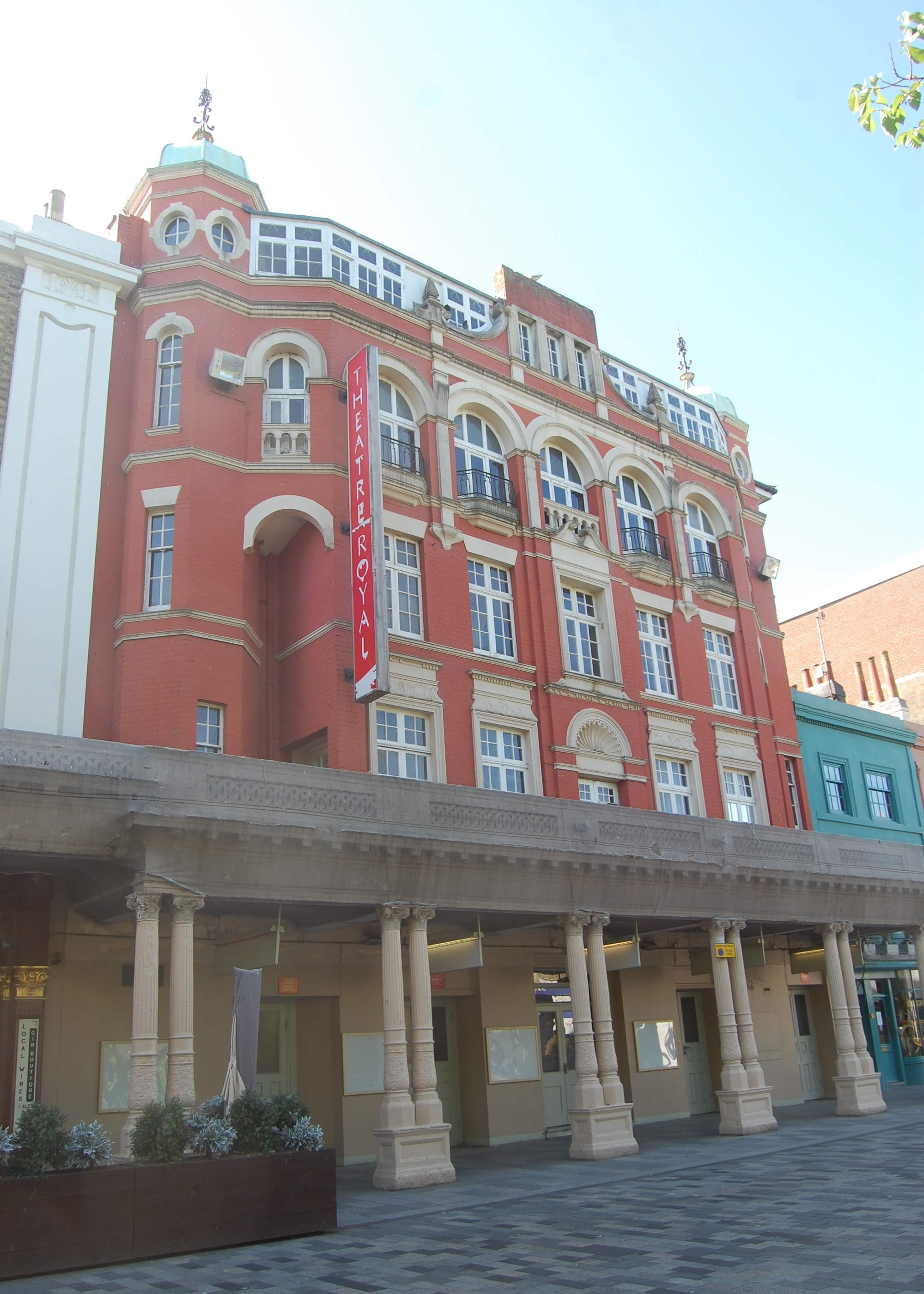
- The Theatre Royal in 2020
- Interactive map of Theatre Royal
- Address: New Road; Brighton; England
- Owner: Ambassador Theatre Group
- Capacity: 952 (four levels)
- Type: Proscenium

Construction
- Opened: 1807
- Rebuilt: 1854
- Years active: 205

Website
- Official Box Office

Listed Building – Grade II*
- Official name: The Theatre Royal and the Colonnade Public House (Number 10) And Attached Colonnade and Stage Entrance to the Theatre Royal
- Designated: 20 August 1971
- Reference no.: 1380103

The Theatre Royal is a theatre in Brighton, East Sussex, England presenting a range of West End and touring musicals and plays, along with performances of opera and ballet.

== History ==
In 1806, the Prince of Wales (later George IV) gave assent for the theatre to be built and it opened on 27 June 1807, with a performance of William Shakespeare's Hamlet. The theatre struggled until it was purchased in 1854 by actor Henry John Nye Chart, who engaged theatre architect Charles J. Phipps to begin a programme of expansion and redevelopment.

The theatre improved its reputation and finances, becoming a respected venue. When Henry John Nye Chart died in 1876 his wife, Ellen Elizabeth Nye Chart, took over and continued the success as one of the first female theatre managers. There is a statue to honour her in the Royal Circle bar.

In 1920, the financial buoyancy of the Theatre enabled the directors to buy adjacent properties and make substantial improvements to the building. In 1923 the Theatre purchased the Colonnade Hotel, now the Colonnade bar and in 1927, the last major structural enlargement was made to the auditorium. In 1928, Walter Hackett's Other Men's Wives premiered at the theatre before transferring to the West End. Later premieres included The Ninth Man (1931), Frieda (1946), Young Wives' Tale (1949), Escapade (1952) and Not in the Book (1958).

In the mid and later 20th Century the Royal's stature and national reputation continued to grow. Ibsen, Rattigan, Coward and Orton plays opened as a try out date before a London West End run. The Redgrave Family, Laurence Olivier, John Gielgud, Charlton Heston, Marlene Dietrich, Margot Fonteyn, Rex Harrison, Judi Dench and Paul Scofield all performed there.

On 20 August 1971 it became a Grade II* listed building, listed as "The Theatre Royal and the Colonnade Public House (Number 10) and Attached Colonnade and Stage Entrance to the Theatre Royal".

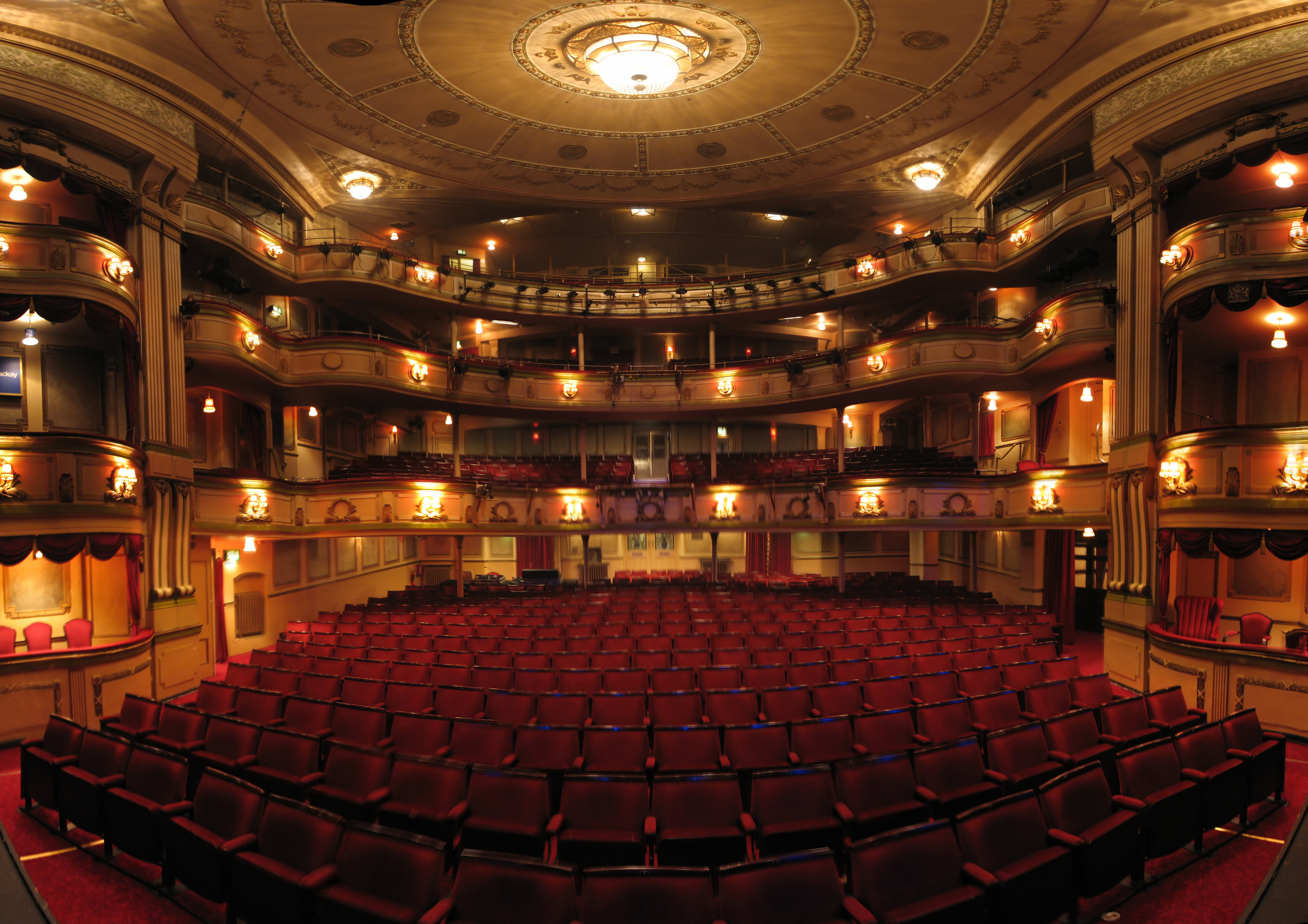
Panoramic view of the interior of the theatre

In 1984, London impresario David Land, bought the theatre and subsidised productions at the theatre out of his own pocket up to £400,000 a year. Land and later his son, Brook, ran the theatre for a decade and a half revitalising the Royal with popular acts.

In 1986, the theatre was featured in the Rainbow episode Visit to the Theatre when Geoffrey Hayes, Zippy and George went to see Peter Pan.

In 1999, the Theatre Royal was bought by the Ambassador Theatre Group and a full-scale modernisation commenced.

In 2007, the theatre celebrated its 200th anniversary with a visit from Queen Elizabeth II. The venue offers backstage tours, where the public can go behind the scenes at the Grade II* listed building.

In recent years, catering to a wider demographic, the Theatre Royal Brighton has chosen to offer an alternative to a Christmas pantomime, which it historically performed, replacing such shows with hits such as Spamalot (2011), The Rocky Horror Show (2012), and Priscilla Queen of the Desert (2013). It also regularly hosts performances during the city's annual Brighton Festival.
