= Joy Young Rogers =

American suffragist (1891–1953)

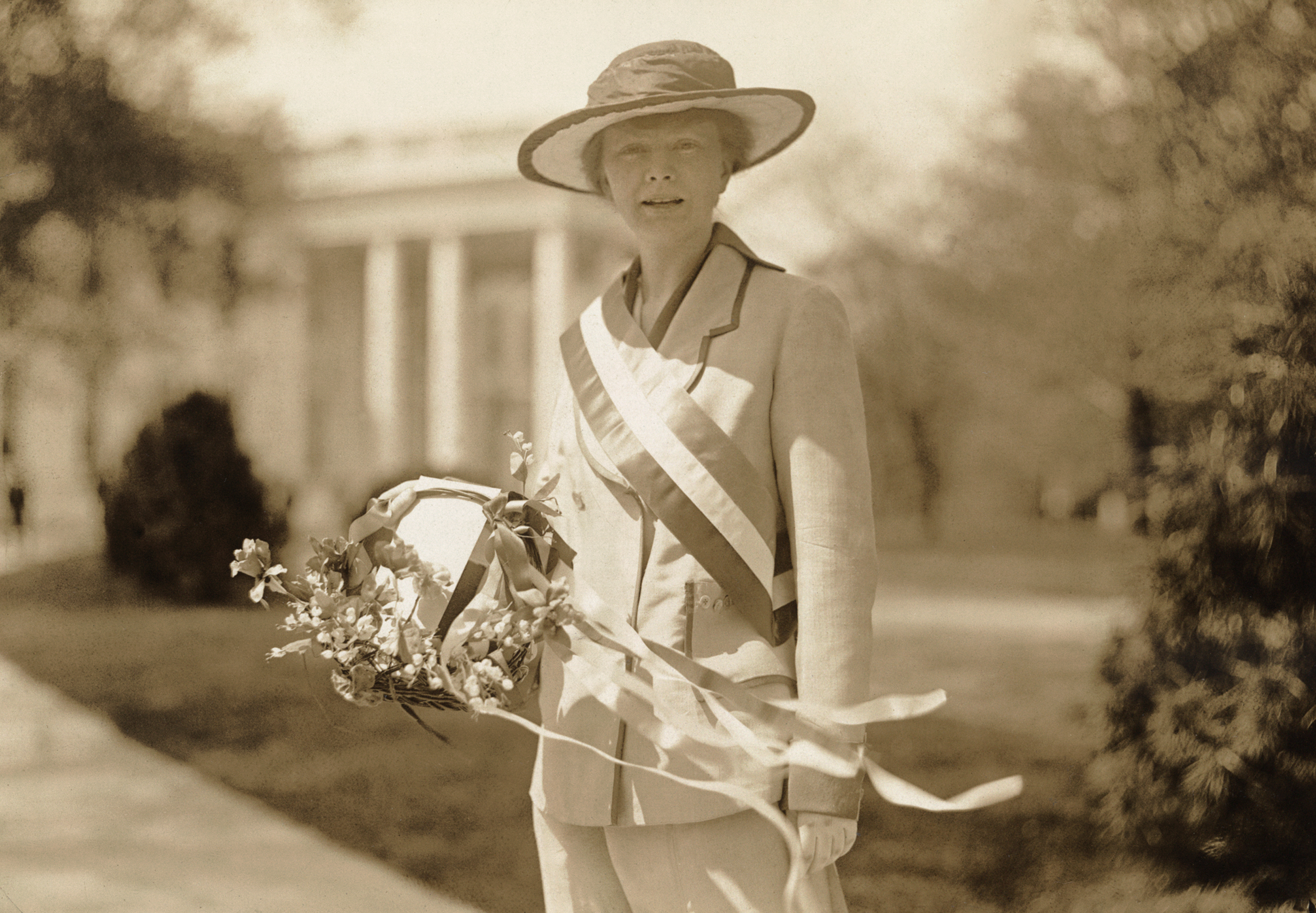
- Joy Young [later Rogers] outside the White House in 1916, about to deliver a request to pass the suffrage amendment to Woodrow Wilson
- Born: Joy Oden Young; August 14, 1891; Falls Church, Virginia, U.S.
- Died: December 10, 1953 (aged 62); Washington, D.C., U.S.
- Occupations: Editor, suffragist
- Spouse: Merrill Rogers

Joy Young Rogers (August 14, 1891 – December 10, 1953) was an American suffragist. She served as an assistant editor of The Suffragist.

== Biography ==
Joy Oden Young was born on August 14, 1891, in Falls Church, Virginia, to Ludwick Craven Young (1841–1930) and Harriet Noyes Oden (1861–1938).

On May 1, 1916, she delivered a basket of flowers to President Woodrow Wilson, which also contained a request for a suffrage amendment and pro-suffrage messages from women from the western half of America.

She was arrested on July 4, 1917, with Lucy Burns and others, for protesting in front of the White House. Rodgers was on the staff of The Suffragist and was an organizer for the National Woman's Party. Her sister, Matilda Young, was also an active suffragist.

She died of a heart attack on December 10, 1953.

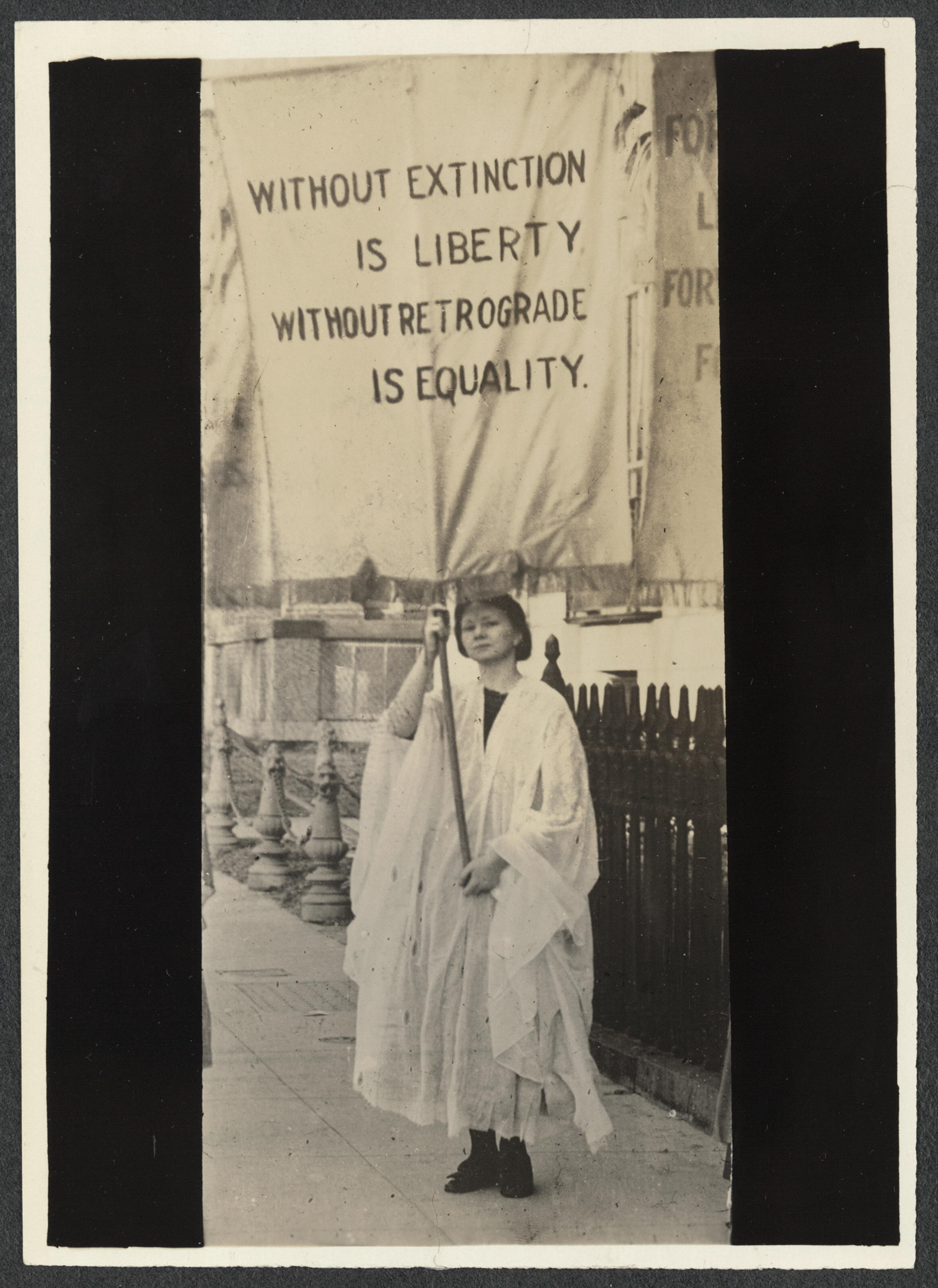
Without Extinction is Liberty, Without Retrograde is Equality
