= The Ninth Man (play) =

1931 thriller play in three acts by Frederick Jackson

- Original language: English
- Written by: Frederick Jackson
- Genre: Thriller

Premiere
- Date: 19 January 1931
- Place: Theatre Royal, Brighton

The Ninth Man is a 1931 thriller play in three acts by Frederick Jackson. A crime drama, the plot focuses on a gang of opium dealers in New York City.

== History ==
The Ninth Man was written as a starring vehicle for Rex Harrison who portrayed Detective Rankin in the original production. Other members of the original cast included John Longden as Costigan, Nora Swinburne as Laurel Prescott, Edward Ashley-Cooper as Legard Draper, Diana Wilson as Nadine Westley, Philip Desborough as Dr. Sindor, Frank Royde as Hotsang, May Beamish as Mrs. Meadows, and Leonard Brett as the undertaker. Brett was also the stage director for this production.

The Ninth Man was supported by the backing of French impresario André Charlot and was produced by Campbell Gullan. The play premiered at the Theatre Royal, Brighton on 19 January 1931. It then had a short tour to provincial theatres before reaching the Prince of Wales Theatre in the West End. It opened at the Prince of Wales Theatre on February 11, 1931 and closed after 45 performances on March 21, 1931.
