= The Suffragist =

Newspaper in Washington, D.C., District of Columbia

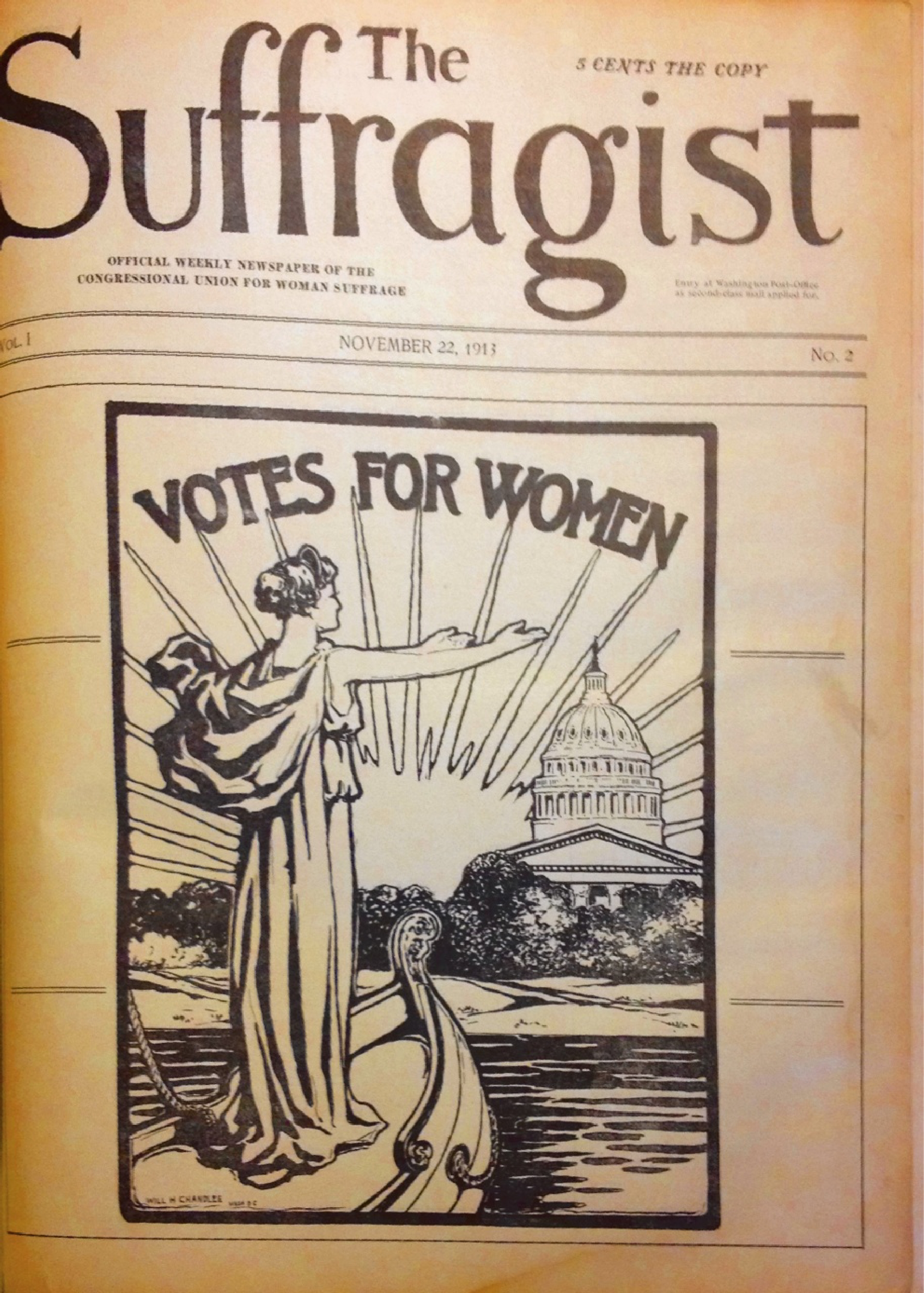
- Type: Weekly newspaper
- Publisher: Congressional Union for Woman Suffrage
- Founded: November 15, 1913
- Ceased publication: 1921
- Political alignment: Women
- Language: English
- ISSN: 1936-945X
- OCLC number: 1585922

The Suffragist was a weekly newspaper published by the Congressional Union for Woman Suffrage in 1913 to advance the cause of women's suffrage. The publication was first envisioned as a small pamphlet by the Congressional Union (CU), a new affiliate of the National American Woman Suffrage Association (NAWSA), which in 1917 became the NWP. It evolved into an eight-page weekly tabloid newspaper when the first issue appeared on 15 November 1913.

Started by Alice Paul with Rheta Childe Dorr as its first editor, its goal was to spread women's political news and to advance movements toward a suffrage amendment. The newspaper gave its publishers an avenue to communicate directly with each other and supporters without mainstream media. In its six years, the publication played an important role in the eventual success of the suffrage movement.

The Suffragist recorded protests and arrests in news accounts and editorials. Along with political cartoons, illustrations, photographs, essays, and poems all served as advocacy devices within the paper. The cover of each issue usually featured a full-page cartoon. Artist Nina Allender drew the vast majority of these. Allender presented a new image of the suffragist as young and physically beautiful, as well as courageous and intelligent. The third page of The Suffragist featured the text of the proposed federal suffrage amendment and at least one editorial.

In 1917, when the National Woman's Party (NWP) began picketing the White House and were arrested, the newspaper served as a light to the public on the treatment of these political people. In 1914, Alice Paul and Lucy Burns were its editors, and Joy Young Rogers was the assistant editor later in 1917 Edith Houghton Hooker became its official editor.

The newspaper ceased publication after the Nineteenth Amendment to the United States Constitution allowing women to vote was passed. It published its last issue in January 1921. After the passage of the Nineteenth Amendment in 1919, it regained publication as Equal Rights, the official National Woman's Party magazine from 1923 until 1954. The magazine served a similar role as The Suffragist. Still, its focus was specifically on the Equal Rights Amendment and other bills affecting women, including protective labor legislation, nationality issues, and jury service.

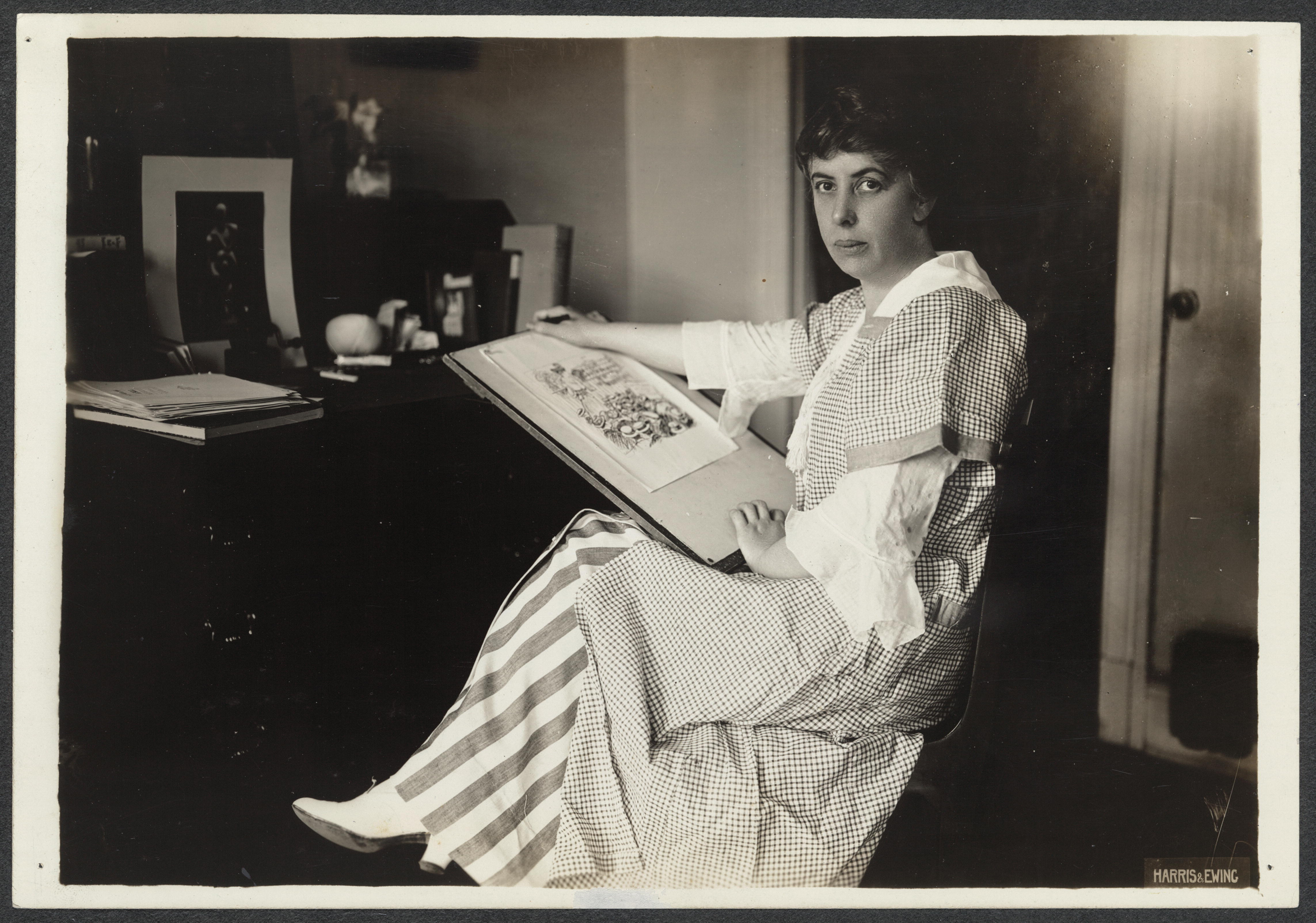
Nina Allender, Cartoonist for The Suffragist.

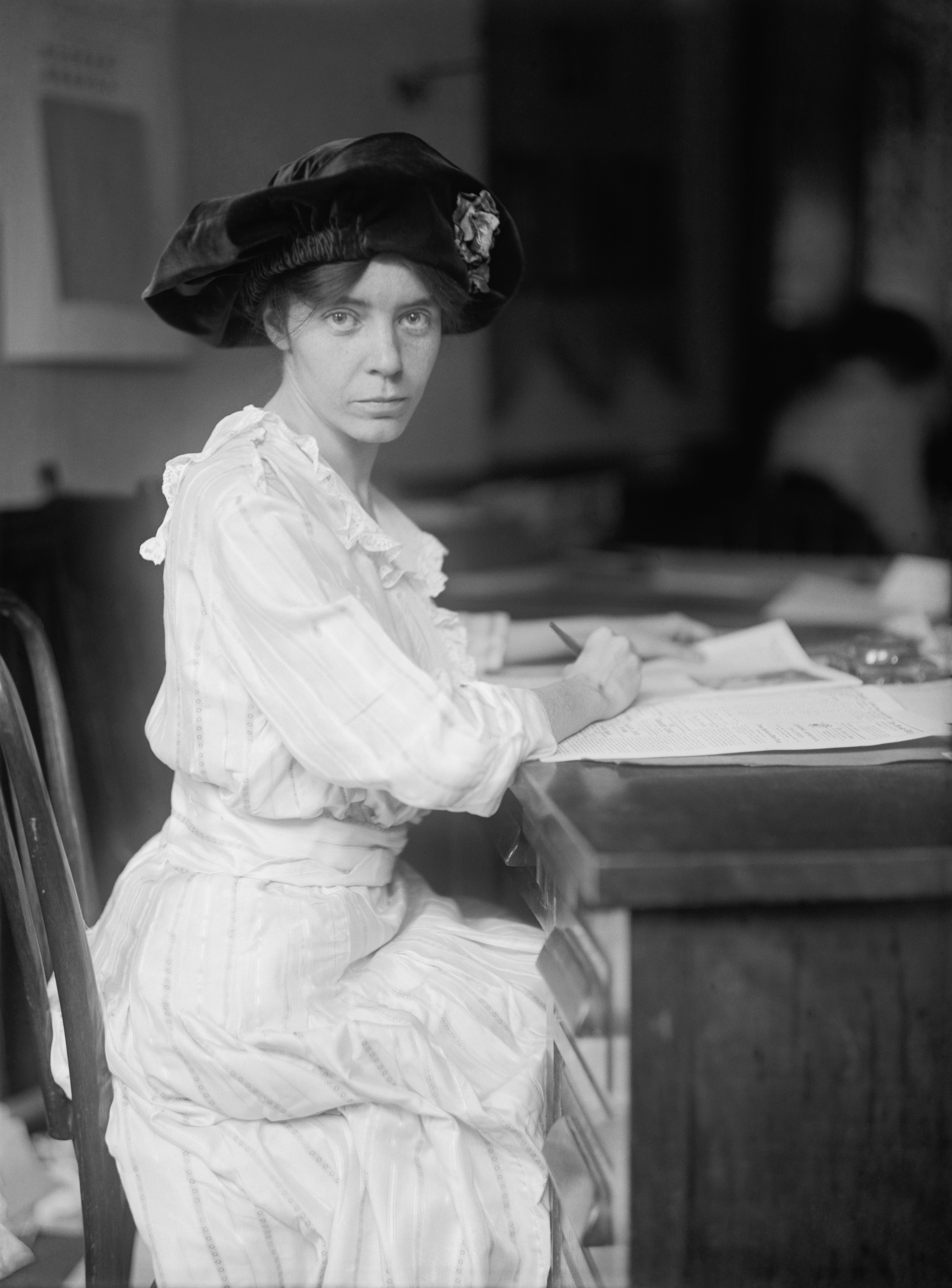
Alice Paul, Founder of The Suffragist.

Rheta Childe Dorr, First editor of The Suffragist.

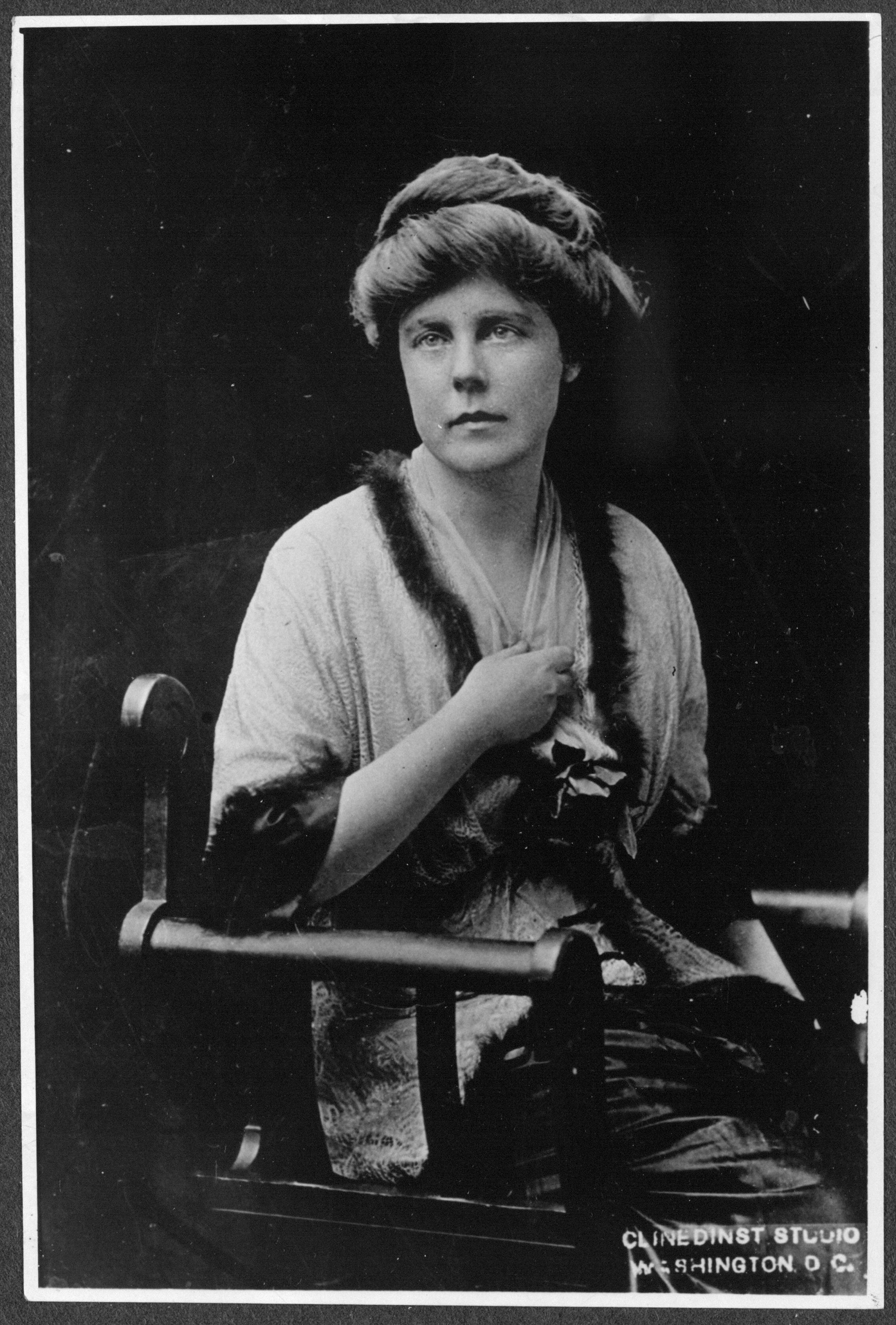
Lucy Burns, Editor of The Suffragist.

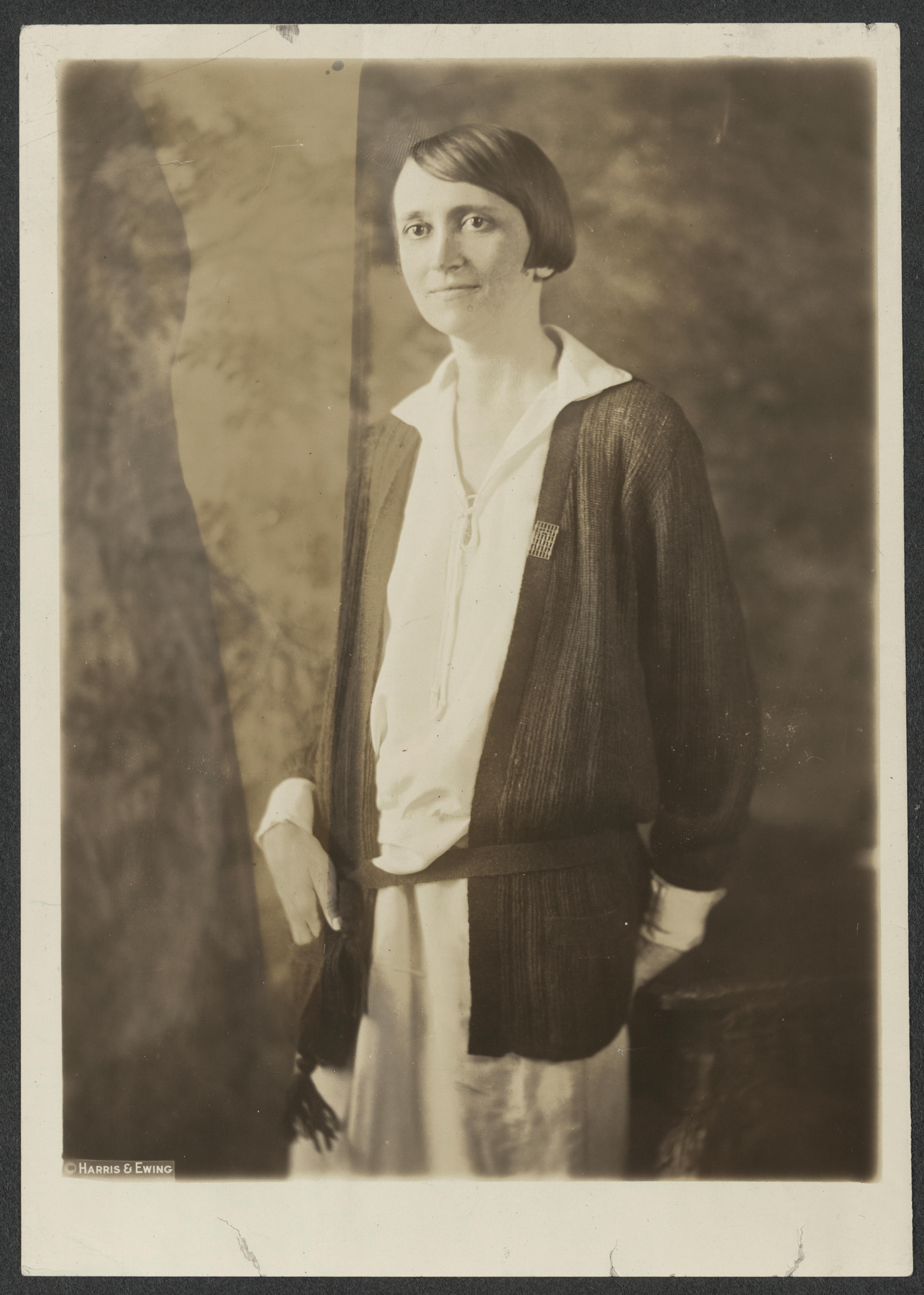
Sue Shelton White, Editor of The Suffragist, circa 1920

== See also ==
- Women's suffrage publications
