= Tinsel (film) =

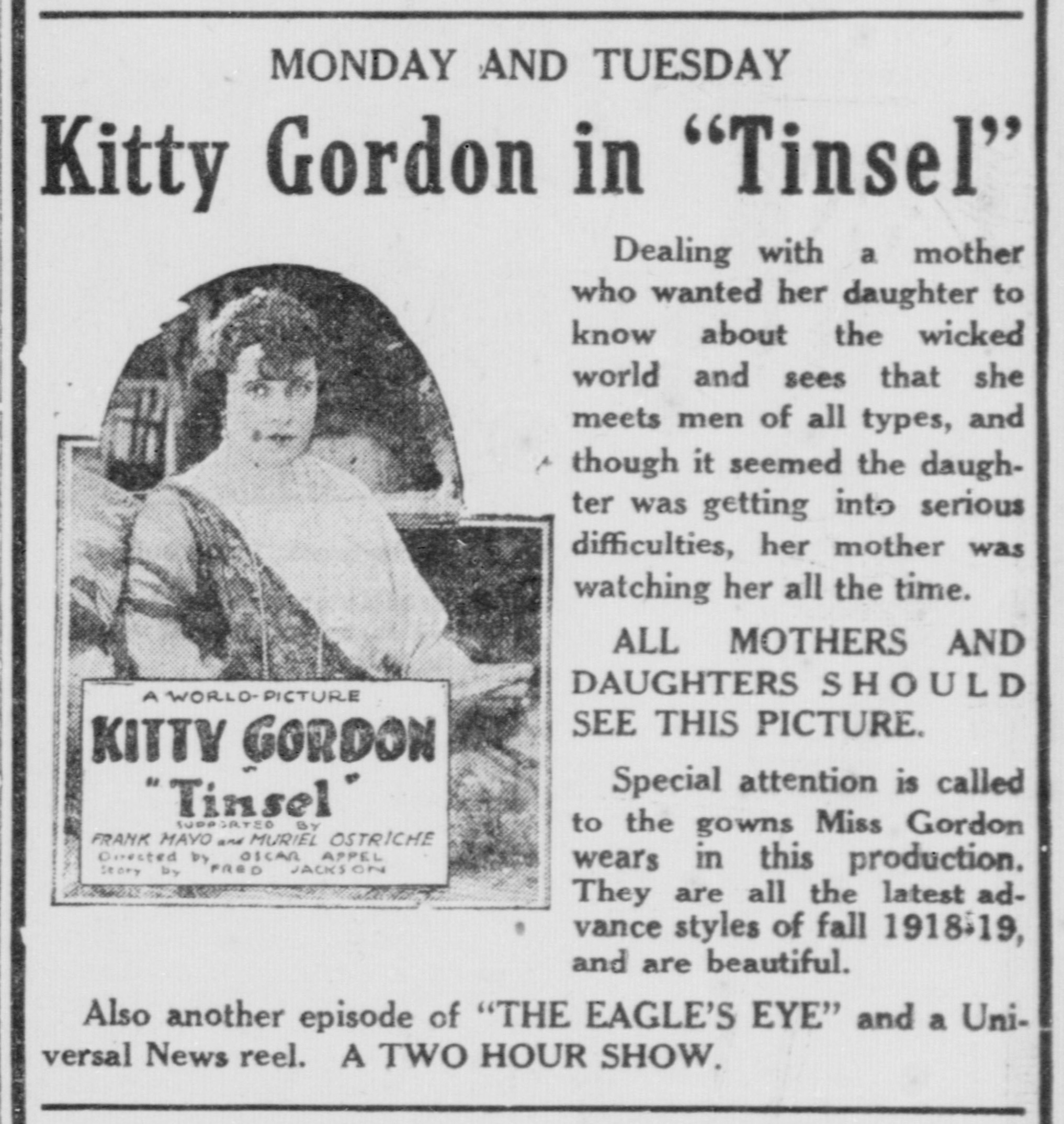
- Newspaper advertisement
- Directed by: Oscar Apfel
- Written by: Wallace C. Clifton
- Based on: story Adele by Frederick J. Jackson
- Produced by: World Film Company
- Starring: Kitty Gordon
- Cinematography: Lucien Tainguy
- Distributed by: World Film Company
- Release date: July 8, 1918
- Running time: 5 reels
- Country: United States
- Language: Silent..English titles

Tinsel is a 1918 American silent drama film directed by Oscar Apfel and featuring Kitty Gordon. It was produced and distributed by World Film Company.

== Cast ==
- Kitty Gordon - Princess Sylvia Carzoni
- Muriel Ostriche - Ruth Carmichael
- Frank Mayo - Jefferson Kane
- Bradley Barker - Richard Carmichael
- Ralph Graves - Bobby Woodward
- George De Carlton - Stephen Roche
- Tony Merlo - Dickey Flemming
- Marie Nau - Denise
- Anne Dearing - unknown role

== Preservation status ==
- Gordon's only surviving film. Prints are held at the George Eastman Museum and the Library of Congress.
