= Merrill Rogers =

United States author

Merrill Rogers (27 May 1892 — 8 November 1964) was an American author, playwright, United States government official, business manager, advertising executive, and magazine editor. He first drew attention as the business manager of the socialist periodical The Masses which became embroiled in two highly publicized court trials in 1918 for alleged violations of the Espionage Act. Rogers, along with other employees of the periodical, were criminally charged by the United States government but neither trial resulted in any convictions. Beginning in 1916, he worked on the editing staff of the American magazine The Dial, and later served on the managing board of that magazine when it was taken over by Scofield Thayer in 1918.

After leaving The Dial, Rogers joined the advertising firm of Calkins and Holden where by 1931 he worked as a copy director. He also worked as a freelance writer of plays for radio and the stage. Two of his plays were staged on Broadway, and one was adapted into a film. During World War II, he moved to Washington, D.C., to join the staff of the War Manpower Commission as the senior speechwriter for Paul V. McNutt. After the war, he worked for the Federal Security Agency as a special assistant to Oscar R. Ewing. He ended his career working for the United States Department of Health and Human Services as a member of the staff of the Committee on Aging. He was married to the American suffragette Joy Young Rogers.

== Life and career ==
Born Charles Merrill Rogers Jr. in Worcester, Massachusetts, Rogers was the son of Charles Merrill Rogers Sr. and Mary Ellen Rogers. He was educated at Harvard University and served as first a staff writer and then editor of The Harvard Monthly while a student. While working for The Harvard Monthly he met the American writer Scofield Thayer, and the two enjoyed a close friendship and later a professional partnership at the American magazine The Dial.

After graduating from Harvard in 1914, Rogers became the business manager of the socialist periodical The Masses. Rogers held that position until the periodical was forced to close following the passing of the Espionage Act (Pub. L. 65–24, 40 Stat. 217, enacted June 15, 1917), and a subsequent labeling of the periodical as "treasonable material" by the federal government. A subsequent court trial was filed by the United States government against Rogers and several other individuals connected to The Masses. They were charged with seeking to "unlawfully and willfully...obstruct the recruiting and enlistment of the United States" military, and faced fines up to 10,000 dollars and twenty years imprisonment. Ultimately, two trials were held, the first ending in a mistrial and the second failing to reach a conviction.

In 1916 Rogers joined the editing staff of The Dial. He became a member of the managing board when the periodical was purchased by Scofield Thayer. In conjunction with Thayer he was responsible for the complete restructuring of the magazine's finances and staff. After leaving The Dial sometime in the 1920s, he moved into the advertising business, and by 1931 he was copy director for Calkins and Holden.

Rogers also worked periodically as a free lance writer of radio and stage dramas. Two of his plays were staged on Broadway, Her First Affaire (1927) and A Thousand Summers (1932). Her First Affaire' also had a successful run in London's West End in 1931, and was adapted into a 1932 film of the same name.

During World War II, Rogers moved to Washington, D.C., where he worked as chief speech‐writer for Paul V. McNutt, Chairman of the War Manpower Commission from 1943 to 1945. He remained in that city after the war as a special assistant to Oscar R. Ewing, the Director of the Federal Security Agency. He finished his career as a member of the staff of the Committee on Aging in the United States Department of Health and Human Services.

Rogers died at the age of 72 at Sibley Memorial Hospital in Washington, D.C., on November 8, 1964. The cause of death was heart disease. His wife, the American suffragette Joy Young Rogers, predeceased him in 1953.
