= Club Havana =

1945 film by Edgar George Ulmer

- Lobby card
- Directed by: Edgar G. Ulmer
- Story by: Fred Jackson
- Produced by: Leon Fromkess
- Starring: Tom Neal; Margaret Lindsay; Don Douglas; Marc Lawrence
- Narrated by: Tom Neal
- Cinematography: Benjamin H. Kline (front for); Eugen Schüfftan
- Edited by: Carl Pierson
- Production company: Producers Releasing Corporation
- Distributed by: Producers Releasing Corporation
- Release date: November 30, 1945 (United States)
- Running time: 62 minutes
- Country: United States
- Language: English

Club Havana is a 1945 American film drama directed by Edgar G. Ulmer. It was produced and released by independent film company Producers Releasing Corporation. It has been compared to the 1933 film Grand Hotel.

== Plot ==
Rosalind (Margaret Lindsay) returns to her Miami home following a divorce to see her boyfriend Johnny Norton (Don Douglas). They visit nightclub Club Havana, where Johnny tells Rosalind that he has fallen in love with another woman. Saddened, Rosalind tries to kill herself, but Bill Porter (Tom Neal) prevents her from doing so. Meanwhile, Jimmy (Eric Sinclair) has discovered that Joe Reed (Marc Lawrence), who murdered club performer Julia Dumont, has been released as the police believe there is not enough evidence that Joe killed her. Although Jimmy witnessed the killing, he is afraid to see police, fearing that Joe will go after his girlfriend Isabelita (Lita Baron). Jimmy instead decides to phone the police, but Myrtle (Sonia Sorel) listens in on the phone call and informs Joe of Jimmy's actions. Joe hires a gunman to murder Jimmy, but the killer shoots Myrtle after she shouts a warning to Jimmy, and she ends up hitting the gunman with her car. As Jimmy goes to the police station to testify, Johnny and Rosalind decide to get back together and go home.

== Production ==
The film was directed by Edgar G. Ulmer. Originally, writer Fred Jackson was set to direct, but Ulmer replaced him by February 1945. The cast includes Tom Neal, Margaret Lindsay, Don Douglas, and Marc Lawrence. The film's story was written by Jackson. It was shot in only four days. Ulmer did not use a script for the film, as producer Leon Fromkess told him "OK, you say you can do things – shoot it without a script – invent it." He shot the film on only one set. Ulmer later recalled in an interview with Peter Bogdanovich that he "adored making" the film.

== Release and reception ==
Club Havana was distributed by Producers Releasing Corporation. They released the film in November 1945. Film scholar Hal Erickson believed the film was "Grand Hotel, PRC style." Film critic Leonard Maltin wrote negatively about the film, calling it a "very cheap production with little of interest."
