= The Naughty Wife =

The Naughty Wife, originally titled Losing Eloise, is a farce in 3 acts by Fred Jackson. It was adapted into the 1919 silent film Let's Elope.

== Performance history ==
The play premiered on Broadway at the Harris Theatre on November 17, 1917, with the name Losing Eloise. The play's producers, brothers Edgar and Archibald Selwyn, retitled the show The Naughty Wife three weeks into its Broadway run with the hope of increasing box office sales with a more salacious title. A sex farce, the original production starred Violet Heming as Eloise Farrington, Charles Cherry as Hilary Farrington, Francis Byrne as Darryl McKnight, Charles Harbury as Bishop Kennelly, Lucile Watson as Nora Gail, Ethel Intropidi as Annette, Charles Mather as Thompson, and S. Harry Irvine as Carter. The play finished its Broadway run in January 1918 after 78 performances, after which the play went on tour throughout the United States with one of its earlier stops being the Park Square Theatre in Boston.
