= Rheta Childe Dorr =

American journalist and political writer (1866–1948)

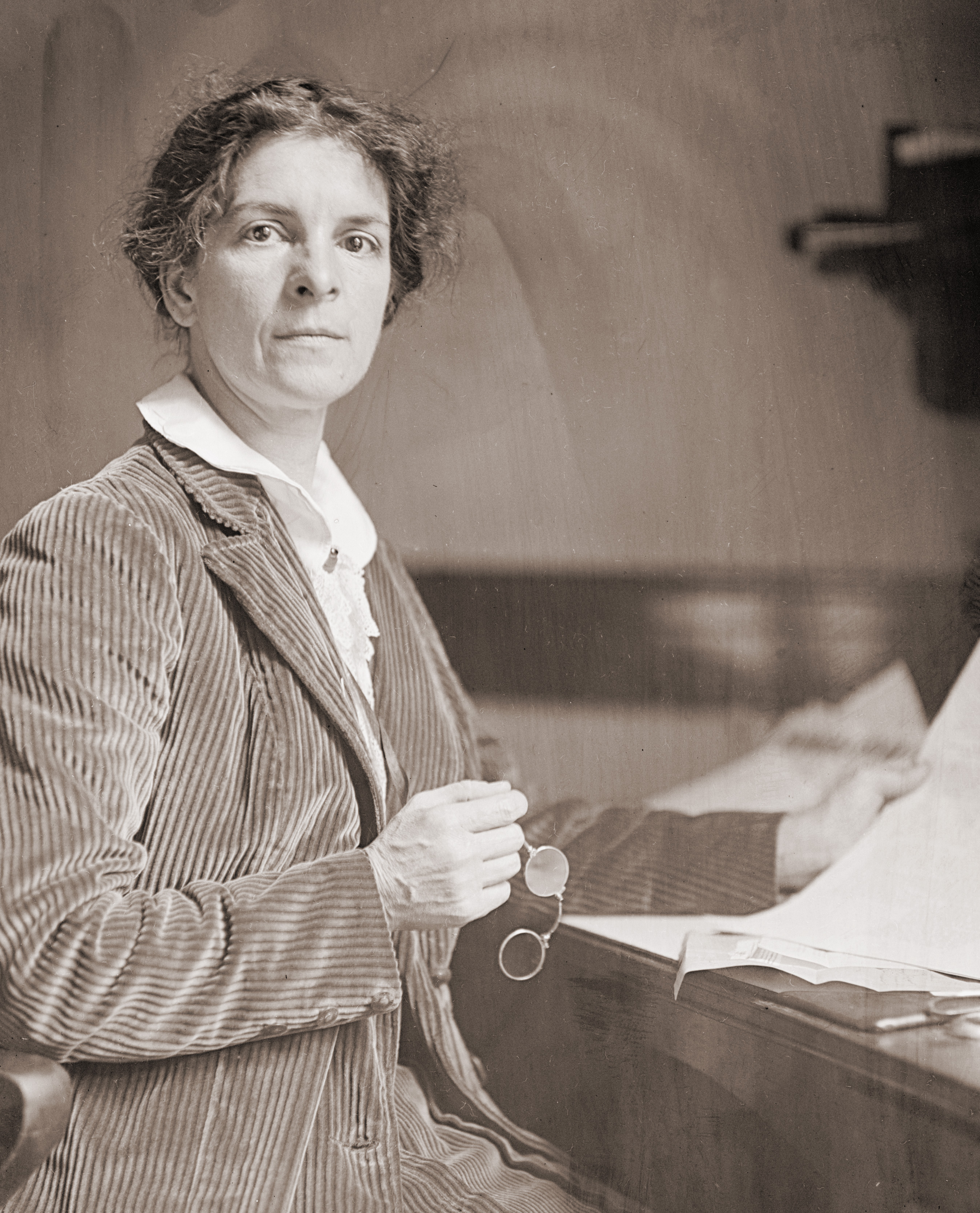
- Born: Rheta Louise Child; November 2, 1866; Omaha, Nebraska, US
- Died: August 8, 1948 (aged 81); Bucks County, Pennsylvania, US
- Occupations: Author, journalist, and political activist
- Employer(s): New York Evening Post, Hampton's Broadway Magazine, New York Evening Mail
- Spouse: John Pixley Dorr

Rheta Louise Childe Dorr (November 2, 1866 – August 8, 1948) was an American journalist, suffragist newspaper editor, writer, and political activist. Dorr is best remembered as one of the leading female muckraking journalists of the Progressive Era and as the first editor of the influential newspaper The Suffragist.

== Biography ==
=== Early years ===
Rheta Louise Child was born November 2, 1866, in Omaha, Nebraska. (Note: The original spelling of the family name did not have a terminal E. The letter was added by Rheta later in life as a stylistic embellishment.) She was the second child in a family of four daughters and two sons born to the former Lucie Mitchell and Edward Payson Child, a New York-born druggist.

One night when she was just 12 years old, Child and her sister snuck out of the family home against their father's wishes to hear Susan B. Anthony and Elizabeth Cady Stanton speak on women's suffrage. The experience proved to be transformative and Dorr became committed to the idea of voting as a fundamental right even at this early age.

Child studied for two years at the University of Nebraska before moving in 1890 to New York City, where she worked as a journalist. While in New York she met John Pixley Dorr, a conservative businessman from Seattle. The couple were married in 1892 and moved to Seattle to start a family.

Even after her marriage Rheta Dorr continued to work as a journalist, interviewing gold miners returning from Alaska writing articles for New York newspapers as a freelancer. Conflict with her traditionalist husband grew and in 1898 the pair separated, with Rheta returning East with her two-year-old son, where she was forced to make her own way financially as a single mother.

=== New York Evening Post years ===
In 1902 Dorr went to work at the New York Evening Post, where she wrote investigative features and material on women's issues. She made special investigations as a worker in factories, mills, and department stores in order to study the labor conditions for women and children.

Dorr bridled at the unequal treatment afforded women in the workplace. In 1927 she recalled of her time at the Evening Post:

"Although I was a female, I had a man's ability to earn a very good living. I knew that because my services as a reporter and writer were sought by the then most distinguished newspaper in New York. It was a mark of ability to be asked to join the staff, a mark of special ability if you were a woman, because in those days very few women could get a job on a newspaper anywhere. Yet because of my sex I had to accept a salary hardly more than half that of any of my male colleagues. Moreover, I was given to understand that I could never hope for a raise. Women, the managing editor explained to me, were accidents in industry. They were tolerated because they were temporarily needed, but some day the status quo ante (woman's place is in the home) would be restored and the jobs would go back where they belonged, to the men."

She was eventually named the paper's "Women's Editor," but soon came to understand that she had run afoul of the paper's glass ceiling; when she asked her managing editor what her future was with the paper, she was told she had none outside of her current position, ostensibly due to her radical political views which were outside those traditionally held by the paper.

=== Political activism ===
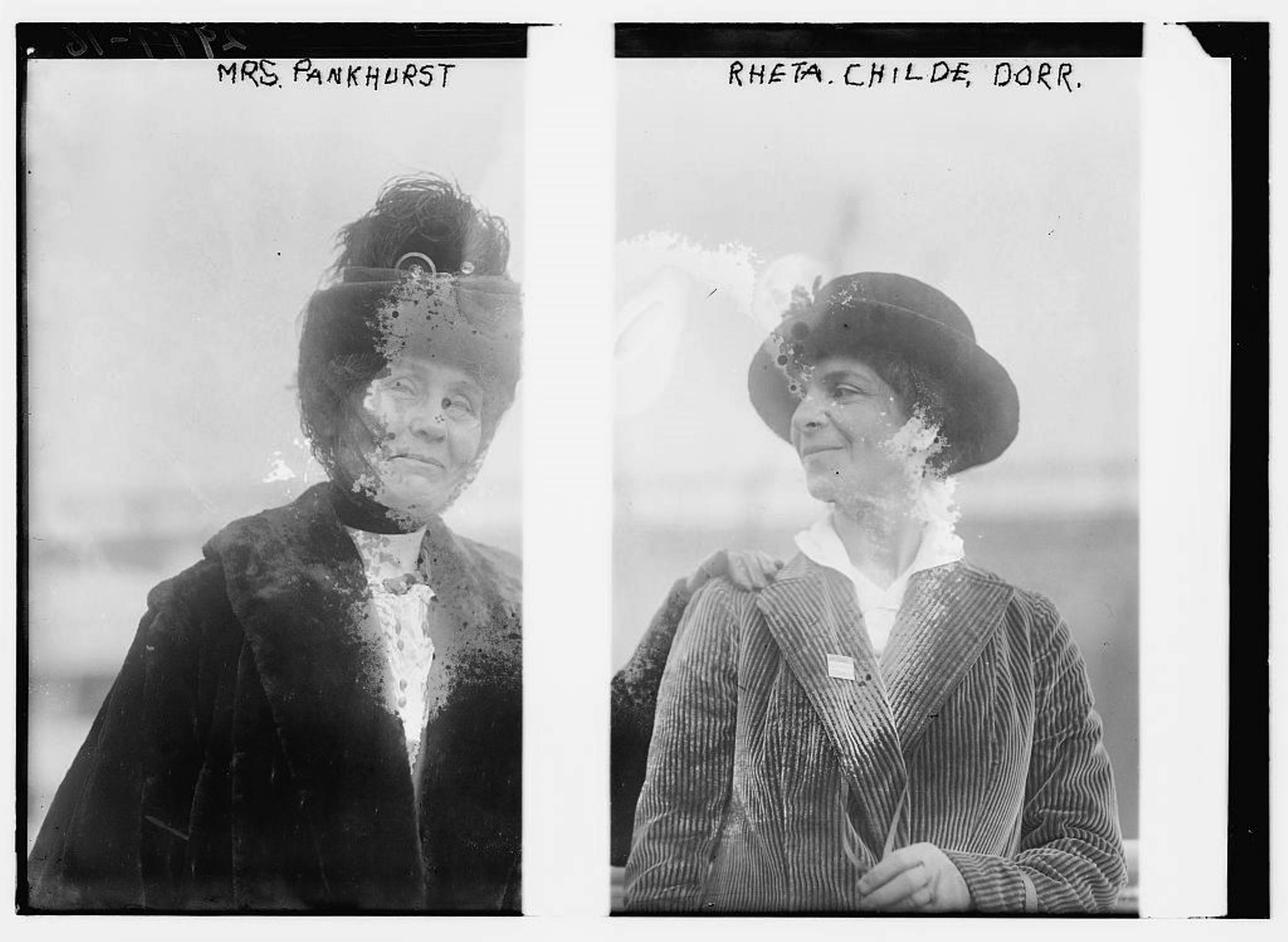
Dorr and Emmeline Pankhurst (between 1910 and 1915)

Dorr left the Evening Post in the summer of 1906 and traveled in Europe, where she became even more interested in the growing international movement to grant the right to vote to women. She continued this activity upon her return to America. Dorr wrote investigative features and gritty vignettes on the grim situation faced by urban working women for the short-lived reform periodical, Hampton's Broadway Magazine. Much of this journalism was collected in hard covers in 1910 as What Eight Million Women Want, a book which was regarded as influential in its day.

Dorr was briefly a member of the Socialist Party of America and lived on the Lower East Side of New York City, where she came into contract with the city's immigrant population and became acutely aware of the economic plight of the working class. Dorr's political activity included picketing for striking workers in the garment industry and working with the Women's Trade Union League on behalf of social legislation such as the minimum wage, the 8-hour day, and women's right to vote. Dorr's political efforts were instrumental on building the coalition of social reformers that forced the first major investigation by the U.S. Bureau of Labor into the conditions faced by female workers.

In 1914 Dorr became the first editor of The Suffragist, official organ of the Congressional Union for Woman Suffrage — the organizational forerunner of the National Woman's Party.

=== European correspondent ===
Dorr dropped out of the Socialist Party over its opposition to American entry into World War I and her belief that the organization favored the "tyranny" of a German victory in the conflict. Nevertheless, Dorr for a time retained a faith in the cause of centralized state socialism, only abandoning her allegiance to that idea in the early 1920s, following her experiences in revolutionary Russia and Czechoslovakia.

Dorr worked as a European correspondent for the New York Evening Mail, with her writing syndicated to numerous other papers. In addition to her journalism, Dorr wrote two popular books on the European situation, including an account of the overthrow of the regime of Tsar Nicholas II entitled Inside the Russian Revolution, published in 1917, and The Soldier's Mother in France, published in 1918.

Dorr returned to Washington, D.C., after the end of the war and planned to go on a tour of the United States to conduct research for a series of magazine articles. This plan was cut short, however, when in late in the night of November 18, 1919, Dorr was hit by a motorcycle and was hospitalized with a broken arm and other serious injuries. The accident effectively ended the active period of Dorr's life, leaving a lasting impact on her memory and health.

From 1920 Dorr became active in Republican Party politics, working on the Presidential campaign of Warren G. Harding and becoming a member of the Women's National Republican Club. Her personal politics became increasingly conservative in her later years. She made several trips to Europe in an effort to regain her health, from which she wrote several articles for the American press as a foreign correspondent. On one of those trips, she visited G.I. Gurdjieff's Institute for the Harmonious Development of Man, in France. She witnessed what she called the "rare dancing shown by Gurdjieff's pupils," and published, in the U.S., an article that described those dances.

In 1922 Dorr assisted Anna Vyrubova with the writing of her memoir, My Memories of the Russian Court. Thereafter Dorr wrote her own memoir, A Woman of Fifty, published in 1924. Dorr moved from her autobiography to a biography of Susan B. Anthony, published in 1928, and completed her publishing activity in 1929 with a tome on the question of prohibition.

=== Death and legacy ===
Dorr had one son, Julian Childe Dorr, who was a United States Consul to Mexico during the Presidential administration of Herbert Hoover. The former envoy died in Mexico City on September 2, 1936.

Rheta Childe Dorr died in New Britain, Pennsylvania, on August 8, 1948. She was 81 years old at the time of her death.

== See also ==
- List of suffragists and suffragettes

== Works ==
- The Thlinkets of Southeastern Alaska. With Frances Knapp. Chicago: Stone and Kimball, 1896.
- Breaking Into the Human Race. New York: National American Woman Suffrage Association, [c. 1910].
- What Eight Million Women Want. Boston: Small, Maynard & Co., 1910.
- "The Women Did It in Colorado: How the Colorado Women Learned to Vote and the Reforms They Have Worked with their Ballots", Hampton's Magazine, 1911.
- Inside the Russian Revolution. New York: Macmillan, 1917.
- The Soldier's Mother in France. Indianapolis, Bobbs-Merrill Co., 1918.
- A Woman of Fifty. New York: Funk & Wagnalls, 1924.
- "A Convert from Socialism," North American Review, vol. 224, whole no. 837 (Nov. 1927), pp. 498–504. In JSTOR.
- "The Man Who Set Virginia One Hundred Years Ahead: An Interview with Governor Byrd," McClure's, vol. 60, no. 2 (Feb. 1928).
- Susan B. Anthony: The Woman Who Changed the Mind of a Nation. New York: Frederick A. Stokes Co., 1928.
- Drink: Coercion or Control? New York: Frederick A. Stokes Co., 1929.
