= Money Isn't Everything (1918 film) =

- Directed by: Edward Sloman
- Written by: William Parker
- Based on: "Beauty to Let" by Frederick J. Jackson
- Starring: Margarita Fischer
- Production company: American Film Company
- Distributed by: Pathe Exchange
- Release date: September 29, 1918 (U.S.)
- Country: United States
- Language: Silent (english intertitles)

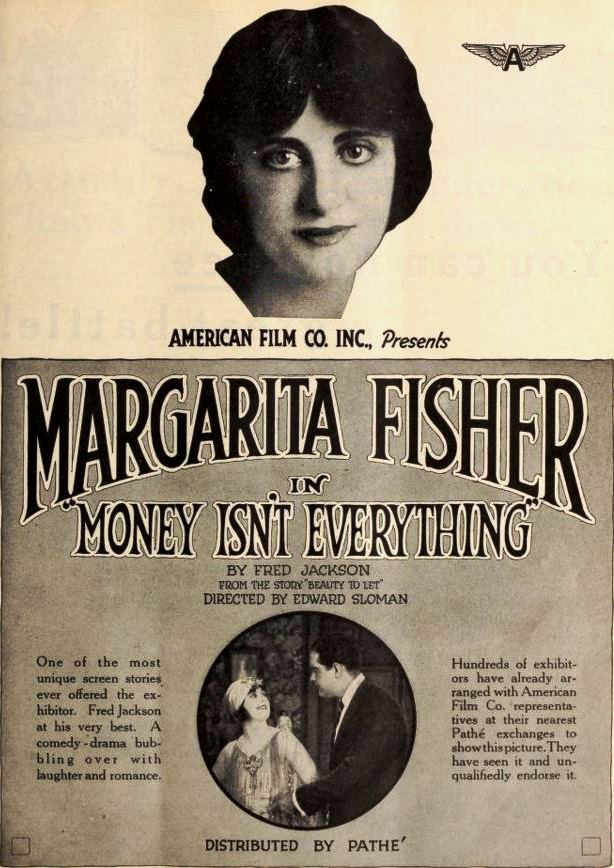
Advertisement for Money Isn't Everything (1918) with Margarita Fischer, on page 15 of the September 7, 1918 Exhibitors Herald.

Money Isn't Everything is a 1918 silent comedy drama feature film directed by Edward Sloman and starring Margarita Fischer. The film was based on an original story by Frederick J. Jackson, and the scenario was written by William Parker. The film was produced by American Film Company and distributed by Pathe Exchange.

== Plot ==
Franklyn Smith, who recently graduated from law school, is called upon by Margery Smith, whose entire capital amounts to $7.00. As she is dainty and beautiful, but with an apparent lack of brains, Franklyn concocts a plan for them both to make money. He signs her to a contract for his new business, the Beauty-To-Let Corporation. He buys up a failing restaurant, installs Margery as the beautiful cashier, and instructs her to not speak to anyone. Attracting the interest of wealthy men who want to hire Margery to attend social events, Franklyn charges them $100 an hour. Two of the wealthy men, 'Diamond Tim' Moody and Henry P. Rockwell, become infatuated with her and compete for her hand, although Margery has fallen in love with Franklyn.

With his new influx of cash, Franklyn purchases a nice home from Moody, which upsets Margery, as it's a bachelor home and he has no intentions of marrying anytime soon. Meanwhile she receives a marriage proposal from Rockwell, which she declines, saying that if she was to marry for money, she would marry Moody. She says that she is going to Moody's farewell party, which Franklyn has forbidden, and he locks her in her room while he leaves with Moody. While locked in her room, she receives a phone call and discovers that Moody has forged the deed to the house, and Moody is going to take off with Franklyn's money. Escaping through the window, she hurries to Moody's party to return the lawyer's money and is caught by Franklyn in his bedroom, and accuses her. At that moment, Moody comes in and accuses them of robbing him, calling the police. The police arrive, and find no money on them. Margery and Franklyn escape, and he's informed of Moody's treachery as she unpins her hair and the money falls out. The two discover they love each other and become engaged.

== Cast ==
- Margarita Fischer as Margery Smith
- Jack Mower as Franklyn Smith
- J. Morris Foster as Henry P. Rockwell
- Wedgwood Nowell as 'Diamond Tim' Moody
- Kate Price as Betty Nan

== Reception ==
Exhibitors Herald's review was quite positive, describing it as a "delightfully breezy little story" and praised Margarita Fischer's acting as being some of the best of her career.

Variety's review was mixed, saying that the story could have easily been told in 2 reels instead of 5, but that the production was elaborate and the reviewer stated "the production is worthier of a better theme."

Motion Picture News' review was more positive, noting that it was light fluffy entertainment that should appeal to audiences because "they won't have to think hard."
