= Frederick J. Jackson =

American screenwriter (1886–1953)

- Born: September 21, 1886; Pittsburgh, Pennsylvania
- Died: May 22, 1953 (aged 66); Hollywood, California
- Occupation: Screenwriter
- Years active: 1912-1946

Frederick J. Jackson, also known professionally as Fred Jackson and Frederick Jackson and under the pseudonym Victor Thorne, (September 21, 1886 – May 22, 1953) was an American author, playwright, screenwriter, novelist, and producer for both stage and film. A prolific writer of short stories and serialized novels, most of his non-theatre works were published in pulp magazines such as Detective Story Magazine and Argosy. Many of these stories were adapted into films by other writers.

Jackson was also a productive screenwriter, penning more than 50 films between 1912 and 1946. He was the author of more than sixty plays. Over a forty-year span, a dozen of his plays were produced on Broadway, and he also had several other plays produced in London's West End. Many of his plays were turned into films; usually by other screenwriters.

== Life and career ==
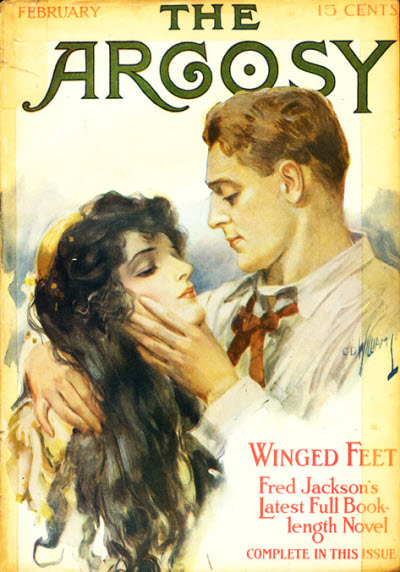
Jackson published scores of stories in magazines; "Winged Feet" appeared in The Argosy in 1914.

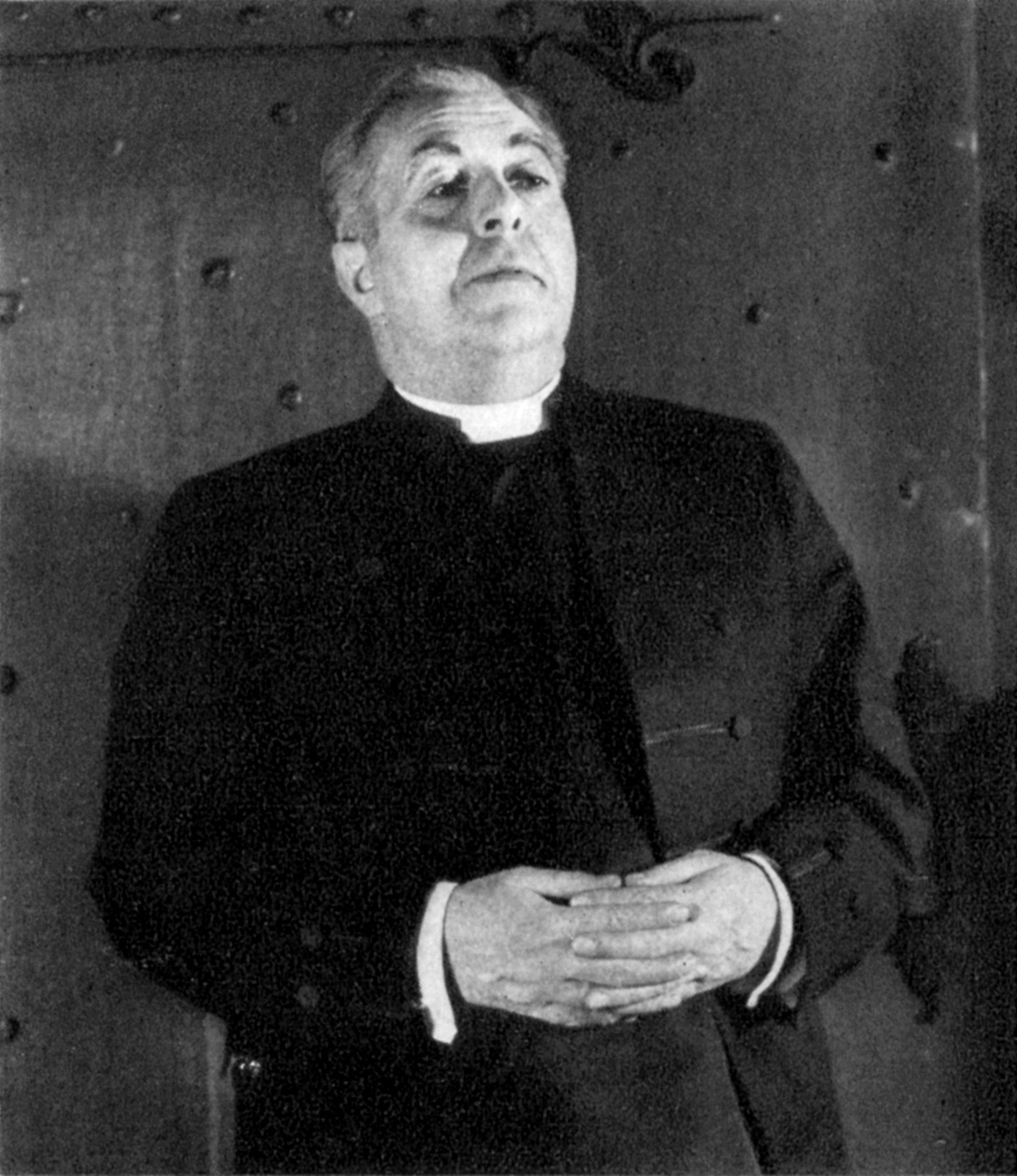
Walter Connolly as the Bishop of Broadminster in the Broadway production of The Bishop Misbehaves (1935)

Frederick J. Jackson was born in Pittsburgh, Pennsylvania on September 21, 1886. He was educated at Washington & Jefferson College in Washington, Pennsylvania. He began his career as a writer in 1905 working for the American magazine publisher Frank Munsey with whom he was under contract for many years.

Under Munsey, Jackson became a prolific writer of short stories and serialized novels, and most of his non-theatre works were published in pulp magazines such as Detective Story Magazine and Argosy. He wrote a wide array of fiction and produced works in nearly every genre in the field in Munsey's magazines; including mystery, romance, westerns, science fiction, and fantasy among others. He did publish some novels in book format using the name Fred Smith with other publishing companies, including The Hidden Princess: a modern romance (1910, George W. Jacobs & Co., Philadelphia) and The Third Act (1914, Desmond Fitzgererald Inc., New York). He also published a third novel, Anne Against the World: a love story (1925, Chelsea House) under the pseudonym Victor Thorne; a name he also periodically used as a playwright and short story writer.

Several of Munsey's short stories and serialized novels were turned into films by other screenwriters. Among these films are Annie-for-Spite (1917), Tinsel (1918), High Speed (1924), The Lone Chance (1924), Love Letters (1924), Her Man o' War (1926), and Ladies Beware (1927).

In 1912 Jackson began his career as a screenwriter, and by 1946 he had penned the screenplays for more than 50 films. His first work for the screen was the 1912 short film A Detective Strategy which was a starring vehicle for the silent film actor Charles Clary and which Jackson based on his own short story "Thistledown". Much of his early work as a screenwriter was devoted to writing for the Pearl White serials, such as The Fatal Ring (1917). Some of his notable later films included Wells Fargo (1937), Stormy Weather (1943), Hi Diddle Diddle (1943), and Club Havana (1945, also known as Two Tickets to Heaven).

Jackson was also a prolific writer for the theatre, producing more than sixty plays during his lifetime. Only a fraction of these managed to make it to Broadway.

He died in Hollywood, California on May 22, 1953. He was married to Florence Howe.

== Partial list of works ==
=== Musicals ===
- La La Lucille (1919, Broadway), book by Jackson, lyrics mostly by Buddy De Sylva and Arthur Jackson, music by George Gershwin; adapted into the film La La Lucille (1920)
- Two Little Girls in Blue (1921, Broadway), book by Jackson, music by Paul Lannin and Vincent Youmans, and lyrics by Ira Gershwin
- For Goodness Sake (1922, Broadway), book by Jackson, lyrics by Arthur Jackson; music by William Daly Jr. and Paul Lannin

=== Novels ===
- The Hidden Princess: a modern romance (1910)
- The Third Act (1914)
- The Precious Packet (1916); adapted by George B. Seitz into the 1916 Pathé film of the same name
- Anne Against the World: a love story (1925, published under the pseudonym Victor Thorne)

=== Plays ===
- A Full House (premiered 1915, Broadway); adapted into the musical The Velvet Lady (1919) and the film A Full House (1920)
- The Naughty Wife, originally titled Losing Eloise, (premiered 1917, Broadway); adapted into the film Let's Elope (1919)
- The Hole in the Wall (1920, Broadway); adapted into the films The Hole in the Wall (1921, screenwriter Maxwell Karger) and The Hole in the Wall (1929, screenwriter Pierre Collings)
- One A Minute (1921); adapted into the film One a Minute (1921)
- Cold Feet (1923, Broadway)
- Stop Flirting (1923, London); re-titled from the 1922 Broadway musical For Goodness Sake, then adapted into the film Stop Flirting (1925)
- Her Past (1929, London); adapted into the film My Sin (1931)
- Her First Affaire (1930, London); this was a new version of the 1927 play by Merrill Rogers and this version credited both Jackson and Rogers as co-authors; adapted into the film Her First Affaire (1932)
- The Ninth Man (1931)
- A Bridegroom's Widow, also known as A Welcome Wife, (year?); adapted into the film Let's Love and Laugh (1931)
- The Widow's Might (1931); adapted into the film Widow's Might (1935)
- The Iron Woman (1932); adapted into the film That's My Uncle (1935)
- School for Husbands (1932, London), staged on Broadway as Wife Insurance (1934); adapted into the film School for Husbands (1937)
- The Bishop Misbehaves (1934); adapted into the film The Bishop Misbehaves (1935)
- Slightly Scandalous (1944, Broadway)
- Dear Charles (1954, Broadway)

=== Screenplays ===
- A Detective Strategy (1912)
- The Stolen Actress (1917)
- The Fatal Ring (1917)
- For Sale (1918)
- The Man Hunt (1918)
- Diamonds Adrift (1921)
- It Can Be Done (1921)
- Fools and Riches (1923)
- The Exiles (1923)
- Arizona Express (1924)
- Shadows of Paris (1924)
- The Dark Swan (1924)
- The Jade Box (1930)
- The Perfect Lady (1931)
- The Great Gambini (1937)
- She Asked for It (1937)
- Wells Fargo (1937)
- Stolen Heaven (1938)
- Say It in French (1938)
- Miracle on Main Street (1939)
- Half a Sinner (1940)
- This Woman is Mine (1941)
- Stormy Weather (1943)
- Hi Diddle Diddle (1943)
- Club Havana (1945)
- Bedside Manner (1945)
- The Bachelor's Daughters (1946)

=== Short stories ===
- Adele (?); adapted by screenwriter Wallace Clifton into the film Tinsel (1918)
- Annie for Spite (1916); adapted by screenwriter Julian La Mothe into the film Annie-for-Spite (1917)
- Beauty to Let (?); adapted into the film Money Isn't Everything (1918)
- Black Marriage (?); adapted into the film Her Man o' War (1926)
- The Gray Parasol (1918); adapted into the film The Gray Parasol (1918)
- Her Martyrdom (?); adapted by screenwriter Harry Chandlee into the film Her Martyrdom (1915)
- High Speed (1918); adapted into the film High Speed (1924)
- Jack of Diamonds (?); adapted into the film Ladies Beware (1927)
- The Lone Chance (?); adapted into the film The Lone Chance (1924)
- Morocco Box (1923); adapted into the film Love Letters (1924)
- Thistledown (?); adapted by Jackson into the short film A Detective Story (1912)

== Bibliography ==
- Susan Avallone, ed. (1998). Film Writers Guide. Lone Eagle. ISBN 9780943728988.
- Robert Beck (2015). The Edward G. Robinson Encyclopedia. McFarland & Company. ISBN 9781476606668.
- Gerald Bordman (1996). American Theatre: A Chronicle of Comedy and Drama, 1930-1969. Oxford University Press. ISBN 9780195358087.
- Sergio Delgado (2016). Pola Negri: Temptress of Silent Hollywood. McFarland & Company. ISBN 9781476664309.
- Dan Dietz (2021). "The Velvet Lady". The Complete Book of 1910s Broadway Musicals. Rowman & Littlefield Publishers. pp. 466–468. ISBN 9781538150283.
- Amy Dunkleberger, Patricia King Hanson, ed. (1999). AFI Catalog of Motion Pictures Produced in the United States. University of California Press with permission by the American Film Institute. ISBN 9780520215214.
- Alan G. Fetrow (1994). Feature Films, 1940-1949: A United States Filmography. McFarland & Company. ISBN 9780899509143.
- Denis Gifford, ed. (2018). The British Film Catalogue: The Fiction Film. Taylor & Francis. ISBN 9781317837022.
- Alan Goble, ed. (2011). The Complete Index to Literary Sources in Film. Bowker-Saur. ISBN 9783110951943.
- Charles Higham (1975). Warner Brothers. Scribner. ISBN 9780684139494.
- Thomas S. Hischak (2009). Broadway Plays and Musicals: Descriptions and Essential Facts of More Than 14,000 Shows Through 2007. McFarland & Company. ISBN 9780786453092.
- Henryk Hoffmann (2015). Western Film Highlights: The Best of the West, 1914-2001. McFarland & Company. ISBN 9781476608655.
- George A. Katchmer (1991). Eighty Silent Film Stars: Biographies and Filmographies of the Obscure to the Well Known. McFarland & Company. ISBN 9780899504940.
- Lynn Kear, James King (2009). Evelyn Brent: The Life and Films of Hollywood's Lady Crook. McFarland & Company. ISBN 9780786454686.
- Einar Lauritzen, Gunnar Lundquist (1976). American Film-index 1908-1915: Motion Pictures, July 1908-December 1915. Film Index, Akademibokhandeln, Stockholm University. ISBN 9174100017.
- Len D. Martin (1991). The Columbia Checklist: The Feature Films, Serials, Cartoons, and Short Subjects of Columbia Pictures Corporation, 1922-1988. McFarland & Company. ISBN 9780899505565.
- Paul Mavis (2015). The Espionage Filmography: United States Releases, 1898 Through 1999. McFarland & Company. ISBN 9781476606668.
- Jay Robert Nash, Stanley Ralph Ross (1985). The Motion Picture Guide. Cinebooks. ISBN 9780933997004.
- Howard Pollack (2006). "La La Lucille". George Gershwin: His Life and Work. University of California Press. ISBN 0-520-24864-3.
- Buck Rainey (1990). Those Fabulous Serial Heroines: Their Lives and Films. Scarecrow Press. ISBN 9780810819115.
- Deena Rosenberg (1997). Fascinating Rhythm: The Collaboration of George and Ira Gershwin. University of Michigan Press. ISBN 9780472084692.
- Geoffrey D. Smith (1997). American Fiction, 1901-1925: A Bibliography. Cambridge University Press. ISBN 9780521434690.
- John T. Soister, Henry Nicolella, Steve Joyce (2014). American Silent Horror, Science Fiction and Fantasy Feature Films, 1913-1929. McFarland & Company. ISBN 9780786487905.
- Aubrey Solomon (2014). The Fox Film Corporation, 1915-1935: A History and Filmography. McFarland & Company. ISBN 9780786486106.
- Ronald Harold Wainscott (1997). The emergence of the modern American theater, 1914-1929. Yale University Press. ISBN 9780300067767.
- J. P. Wearing (2014). The London Stage 1890-1959: Accumulated Indexes. Rowman & Littlefield Publishers. ISBN 9780810893214.
- Ken Wlaschin (2009). "Jackson, Frederick". Silent Mystery and Detective Movies: A Comprehensive Filmography. McFarland & Company. ISBN 9780786443505.
- Eugene Michael Vazzana (1995). Silent Film Necrology: Births and Deaths of Over 9000 Performers, Directors, Producers, and Other Filmmakers of the Silent Era, Through 1993. McFarland & Company. ISBN 9780786401321.
