= Mary Pickford =

Canadian actress and producer (1892–1979)

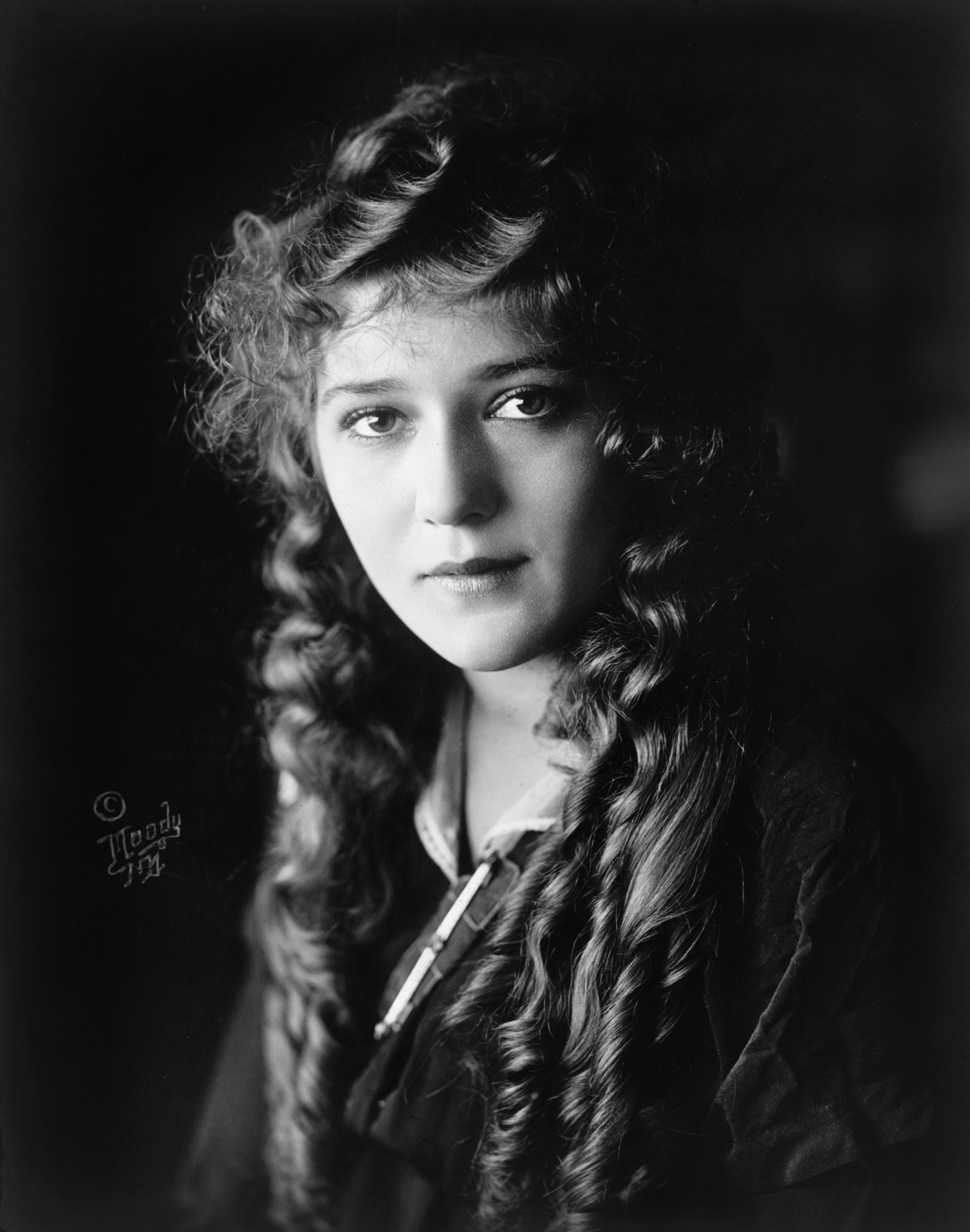
- Pickford in 1910
- Born: Gladys Louise Smith; April 8, 1892; Toronto, Ontario, Canada
- Died: May 29, 1979 (aged 87); Santa Monica, California, U.S.
- Burial place: Forest Lawn Memorial Park, Glendale, California
- Citizenship: British subject (1892–1947); United States (1920–1979); Canada (1947–1979)
- Occupations: Actress; producer; screenwriter; businesswoman
- Years active: 1900–1955
- Known for: The Female of the Species; The Poor Little Rich Girl; In the Bishop's Carriage; Caprice; Coquette; Hearts Adrift; Rebecca of Sunnybrook Farm; Tess of the Storm Country; Pollyanna
- Spouses: Owen Moore (m. 1911; div. 1920); Douglas Fairbanks (m. 1920; div. 1936); Charles "Buddy" Rogers (m. 1937)
- Children: 2
- Mother: Charlotte Hennessey
- Relatives: Lottie Pickford (sister); Jack Pickford (brother)
- Awards: Hollywood Walk of Fame; 2 Academy Awards
- Website: Mary Pickford Foundation

Gladys Louise Smith (April 8, 1892 – May 29, 1979), baptised as Gladys Marie Smith, known professionally as Mary Pickford, was a Canadian American film actress and producer. A pioneer in the American film industry with a Hollywood career spanning five decades, Pickford was one of the most popular actresses of the silent film era. Beginning her film career in 1909, Pickford became Hollywood's first millionaire by 1916, and, at the height of her career, had complete creative control of her films and was one of the most recognizable women in the world. Due to her popularity, unprecedented international fame, and success as an actress and businesswoman, she was known as the "Queen of the Movies". She was a significant figure in the development of film acting and is credited with having defined the ingénue type in cinema, a persona that also earned her the nickname "America's Sweetheart".

In 1919, she co-founded United Artists alongside Charlie Chaplin, Douglas Fairbanks, and D. W. Griffith, and was also one of the 36 founders of the Academy of Motion Picture Arts and Sciences in 1927. She was awarded the second Academy Award for Best Actress for her first sound film role in Coquette (1929) and received an Academy Honorary Award in 1976 in consideration of her contributions to American cinema. In 1999, the American Film Institute named Pickford as the 24th-greatest female star of Classical Hollywood Cinema.

== Early life ==
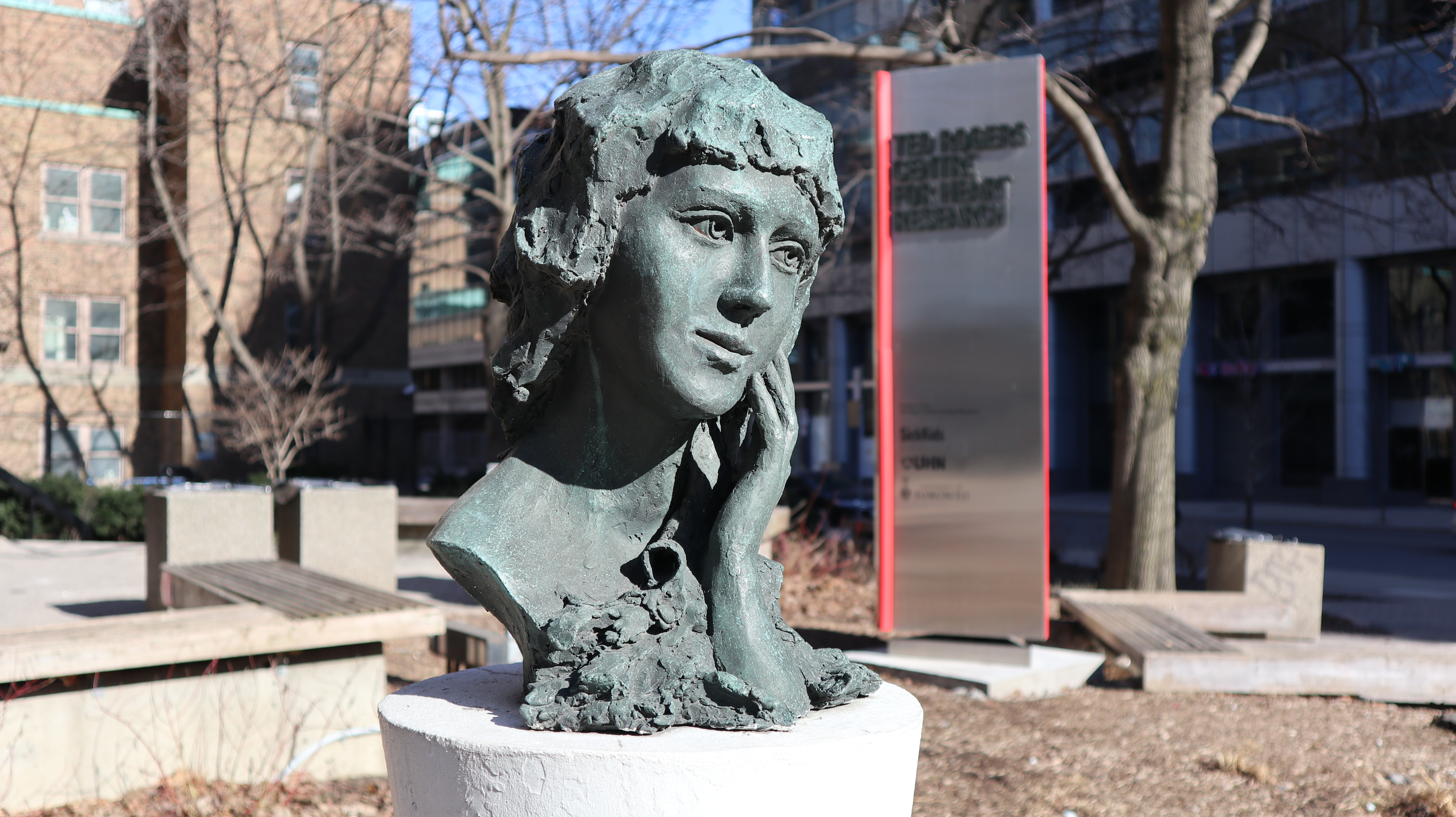
Bust of Mary Pickford on University Avenue, near her Toronto birthplace

Mary Pickford was born Gladys Louise Smith in 1892, at 211 (later 561) University Avenue, Toronto, Ontario, at Victoria Hospital, renamed the Hospital for Sick Children in 1951. Her father, John Charles Smith, was the son of English Methodist immigrants, and worked a variety of odd jobs. Her mother, Charlotte Hennessey, was of Irish Catholic descent and worked for a time as a seamstress. Pickford had two younger siblings, both actors. Charlotte was billed as "Lottie Pickford" (born 1893), and John Charles Jr. was billed as "Jack Pickford" (born 1896). To please her husband's relatives, Pickford's mother baptized her children as Methodists, the religion of their father. John Charles Sr. was an alcoholic. He died on February 11, 1898, from a fatal blood clot caused by a workplace accident when he was a purser with Niagara Steamship. Her father's death when Mary was five, was accompanied by her mother's screams, a traumatic event Mary would relive throughout her life. It traumatized young Mary so much that she did not attend school and did not learn to read as a child.

The house was situated in a poor district of Toronto known as "The Ward" where disease was prevalent. When Gladys was four years old, her household was under infectious quarantine as a public health measure. Their devoutly Catholic maternal grandmother (Catherine Faeley Hennessey) asked a visiting Roman Catholic priest to baptize the children. Pickford was at this time baptized as Gladys Marie Smith. Gladys attended McCaul School on University Avenue.

After being widowed in 1898, Charlotte Smith began taking in boarders, one of whom was a Mr. Murphy, the theatrical stage manager for Cummings Stock Company, who soon suggested that Gladys, then age seven, and Lottie, then age six, be given two small theatrical roles—Gladys portrayed a girl and a boy, while Lottie was cast in a silent part in the company's production of The Silver King at Toronto's Princess Theatre (destroyed by fire in 1915, rebuilt, demolished in 1931), while their mother played the organ. Pickford subsequently acted in many melodramas with Toronto's Valentine Stock Company, ultimately playing the major child role in its version of The Silver King. She concluded her early career in Toronto with the starring role of Little Eva in the Valentine production of Uncle Tom's Cabin, adapted from the 1852 novel.

== Career ==
=== Early years ===
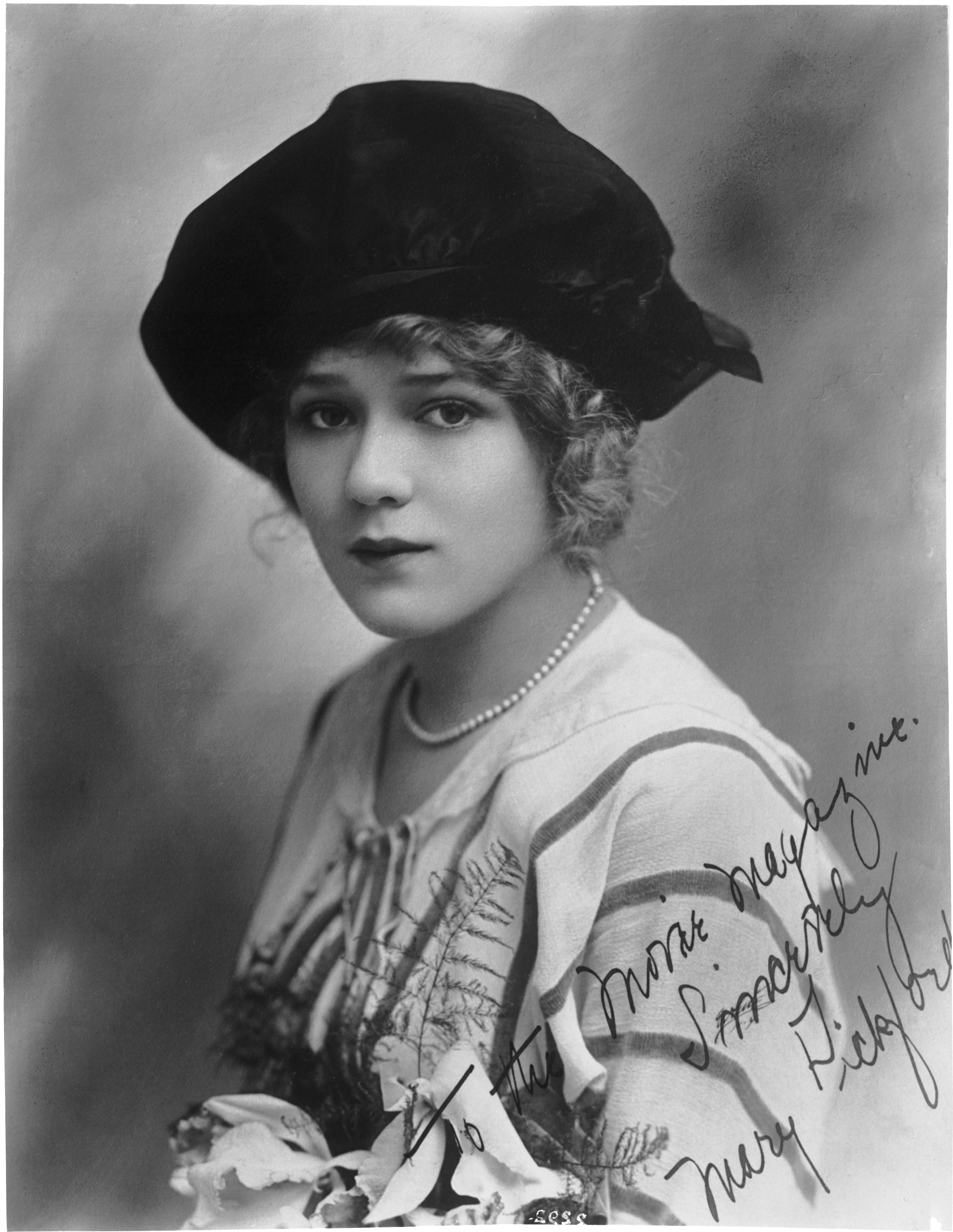
Mary Pickford, 1914–1915 (digitally restored)

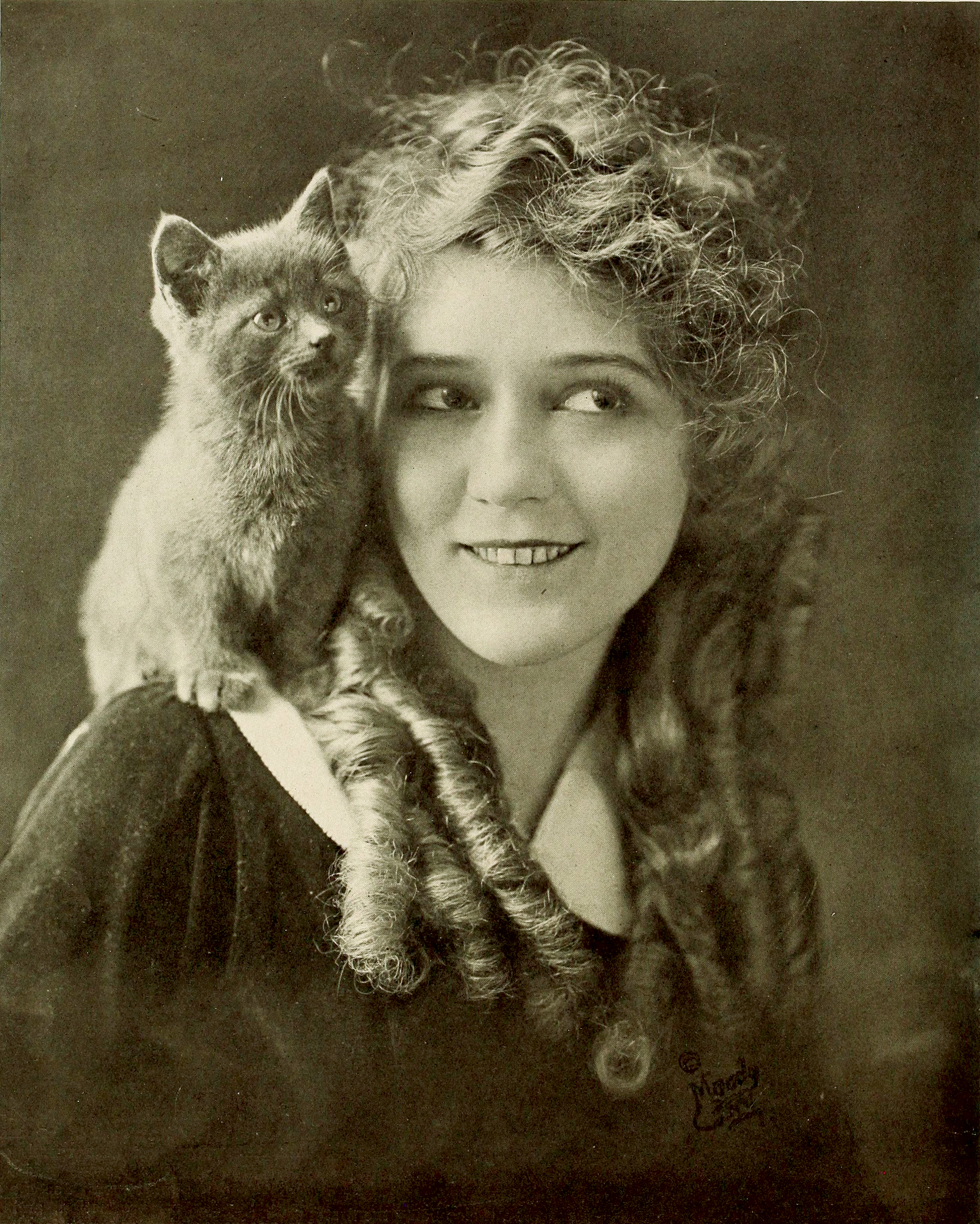
Mary Pickford, 1916

In 1901, the family moved to the United States to pursue theatre as a family enterprise. The family joined the travelling company of The Fatal Wedding. 'Baby Gladys Smith' had the lead child role as the Little Mother, Lottie was her understudy, Jack had a small role, and Charlotte was a French maid. Gladys, her mother, and two younger siblings toured the United States by rail, performing in third-rate companies and plays. Life was one of poverty on Gladys' income, with Gladys helping her mother care for her younger siblings. Gladys learned to read and write through some school primers Charlotte bought, and received no formal schooling. On some tours, Charlotte and Jack would perform in one company, and Gladys and Lottie in another. Charlotte arranged for her daughters to be cared for by troupe members. It was during this time that the Smiths would become friends with another show family, Mary Gish and her two daughters Lillian and Dorothy.

In 1905, she played the boy Freckles in Hal Reid's The Gypsy Girl on tour, and at the Star Theatre on Broadway. In 1906, Gladys, Lottie, and Jack Smith supported singer Chauncey Olcott on Broadway in Edmund Burke.

Living in New York City, Gladys pursued the successful Broadway producer David Belasco at his office for months. Eventually Belasco relented and auditioned Gladys for a child role in the 1907 Broadway play The Warrens of Virginia. Belasco hired her for the part at US$25 per week, but was unhappy with her name for the stage. He liked her middle name and for a last name chose Gladys' maternal grandmother's last name Pickford. Mary Pickford became her permanent stage name. The play was written by William C. deMille, whose brother, Cecil, appeared in the cast. After completing its Broadway run, the play toured, including a stop in her hometown of Toronto. It played at the Royal Alexandra Theatre in January 1909.

In 1909, her savings from the Broadway production ran out, and at her mother's suggestion to try getting a part in a motion picture, she went to the Biograph Company studio in New York, not expecting any success to come of it. On April 19, 1909, Biograph director D. W. Griffith screen-tested her for a role in the nickelodeon film Pippa Passes. The role went to someone else, but Griffith was immediately taken with Pickford. She quickly grasped that movie acting was simpler than the stylized stage acting of the day. Most Biograph actors earned $5 a day, but after Pickford's single day in the studio, Griffith agreed to pay her $10 a day on a $40-a-week guarantee. Pickford made her first film appearance in Her First Biscuits, filmed the next day. Pickford only appears in the seven-minute film near the end, but stands out in her white dress amongst the cast of actors.

Pickford, like all actors at Biograph, played both leading roles and bit parts, including mothers, ingénues, charwomen, spitfires, slaves, Native Americans, spurned women, and a prostitute. As Pickford said of her success at Biograph:

I played scrubwomen and secretaries and women of all nationalities ... I decided that if I could get into as many pictures as possible, I'd become known, and there would be a demand for my work.

She appeared in 51 films in 1909—almost one a week—with her first starring role being in The Violin Maker of Cremona opposite future husband Owen Moore. While at Biograph, she suggested to Florence La Badie to "try pictures", invited her to the studio and later introduced her to D. W. Griffith, who launched La Badie's career.

In January 1910, Pickford traveled with a Biograph crew to Los Angeles. Many other film companies wintered on the West Coast, escaping the weak light and short days that hampered winter shooting in the East. Pickford added to her 1909 Biographs (Sweet and Twenty, They Would Elope, and To Save Her Soul, to name a few) with films made in California.

Actors were not listed in the credits in Griffith's company. Audiences noticed and identified Pickford within weeks of her first film appearance. Exhibitors, in turn, capitalized on her popularity by advertising on sandwich boards that a film featuring "The Girl with the Golden Curls", "Blondilocks", or "The Biograph Girl" was inside.

Pickford left Biograph in December 1910. The following year, she starred in films at Carl Laemmle's Independent Moving Pictures Company (IMP). IMP was absorbed into Universal Pictures in 1912, along with Majestic. Unhappy with their creative standards, Pickford returned to work with Griffith in 1912. Some of her best performances were in his films, such as Friends, The Mender of Nets, Just Like a Woman, and The Female of the Species. That year, Pickford also introduced her friends Dorothy and Lillian Gish to Griffith, and each became a major silent film star, in comedy and tragedy, respectively. Pickford made her last Biograph picture, The New York Hat, in late 1912.

She returned to Broadway in the David Belasco production of A Good Little Devil (1912). This was a major turning point in her career. Pickford, who had always hoped to conquer the Broadway stage, discovered how deeply she missed film acting. In 1913, she decided to work exclusively in film. The previous year, Adolph Zukor had formed Famous Players in Famous Plays. It was later known as Famous Players–Lasky and then Paramount Pictures, one of the first American feature film companies.

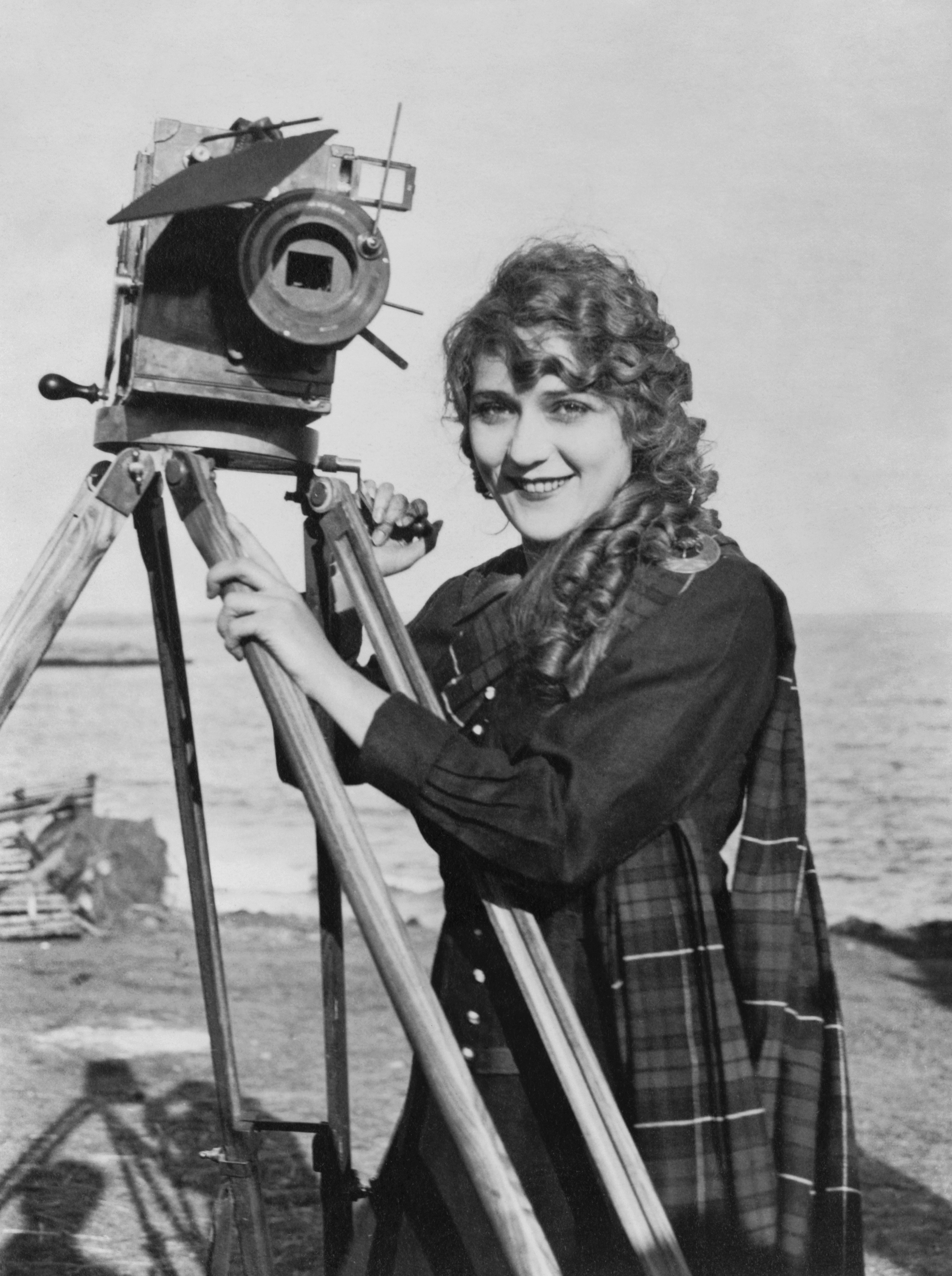
Mary Pickford, 1916

Pickford left the stage to join Zukor's roster of stars. Zukor believed film's potential lay in recording theatrical players in replicas of their most famous stage roles and productions. Zukor first filmed Pickford in a silent version of A Good Little Devil. The film, produced in 1913, showed the play's Broadway actors reciting every line of dialogue, resulting in a stiff film that Pickford later called "one of the worst [features] I ever made ... it was deadly". Zukor agreed; he held the film back from distribution for eleven months.

Pickford's work in material written for the camera by that time had attracted a strong following. Comedy-dramas, such as In the Bishop's Carriage (1913), Caprice (1913), and especially Hearts Adrift (1914), made her irresistible to moviegoers. Hearts Adrift was so popular that Pickford asked for the first of her many publicized pay raises based on the profits and reviews. The film marked the first time Pickford's name was featured above the title on movie marquees. Tess of the Storm Country was released five weeks later. Biographer Kevin Brownlow observed that the film "sent her career into orbit and made her the most popular actress in America, if not the world".

Her appeal was summed up two years later by the February 1916 issue of Photoplay as "luminous tenderness in a steel band of gutter ferocity". Only Charlie Chaplin, who slightly surpassed Pickford's popularity in 1916, had a similarly spellbinding pull with critics and the audience. Each enjoyed a level of fame far exceeding that of other actors. Throughout the 1910s and 1920s, Pickford was believed to be the most famous woman in the world, or, as Adela Rogers St. Johns later described her, "the best known woman who has ever lived, the woman who was known to more people and loved by more people than any other woman that has been in all history".

=== Stardom ===
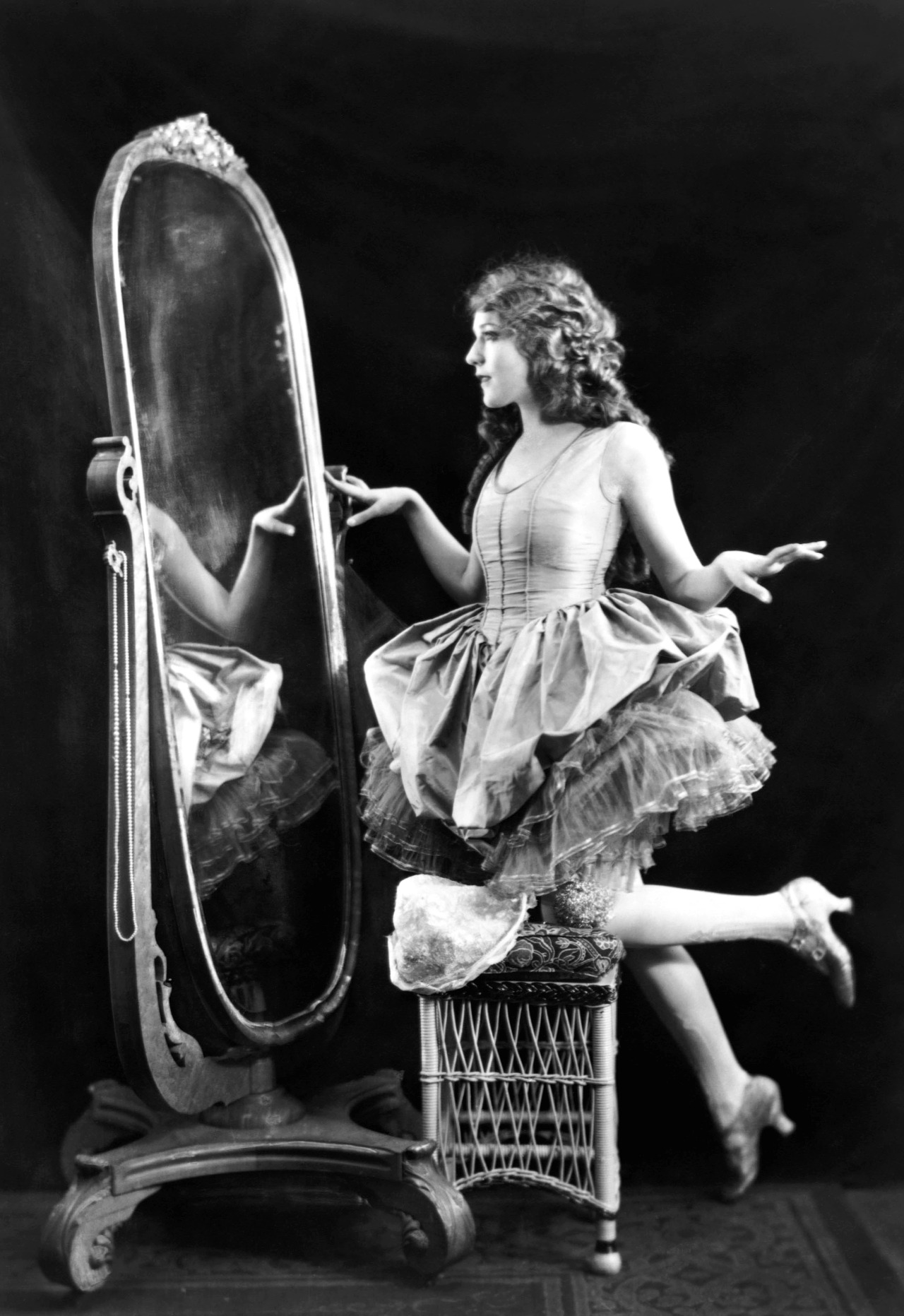
Mary Pickford, 1920

Pickford starred in 52 features throughout her career. On June 24, 1916, Pickford signed a new contract with Zukor that granted her full authority over the production of the films in which she starred, and a record-breaking salary of $10,000 a week. In addition, Pickford's compensation was half of a film's profits, with a guarantee of $1.04 million (US$23,290,000 in 2025), making her the first actress to sign a million-dollar contract. She also became vice-president of Pickford Film Corporation.

Occasionally, she played a child, in films such as The Poor Little Rich Girl (1917), Rebecca of Sunnybrook Farm (1917), Daddy-Long-Legs (1919), and Pollyanna (1920). Pickford's fans were devoted to these "little girl" roles, but they were not typical of her career. Due to her lack of a normal childhood, she enjoyed making these pictures. Given how small she was, at under five feet, and her naturalistic acting abilities, she was very successful in these roles. Douglas Fairbanks Jr., when he first met her in person as a boy, assumed she was a new playmate for him, and asked her to come and play trains with him, which she obligingly did.

In August 1918, Pickford's contract expired, and, when refusing Zukor's terms for a renewal, she was offered $250,000 to leave the motion picture business. She declined and went to First National Pictures, which agreed to her terms. In 1919, Pickford, along with D. W. Griffith, Charlie Chaplin, and Douglas Fairbanks, formed the independent film production company United Artists. Through United Artists, Pickford continued to produce and perform in her own movies; she could also distribute them as she chose. In 1920, Pickford's film Pollyanna grossed around US$1,100,000 (equivalent to $17,678,571 in 2025). The following year, Pickford's film Little Lord Fauntleroy was also a success, and in 1923, Rosita grossed over $1 million as well. During this period, she also made Little Annie Rooney (1925), another film in which Pickford played a child, Sparrows (1926), which blended the Dickensian with newly minted German expressionist style, and My Best Girl (1927), a romantic comedy featuring her future husband Charles "Buddy" Rogers.

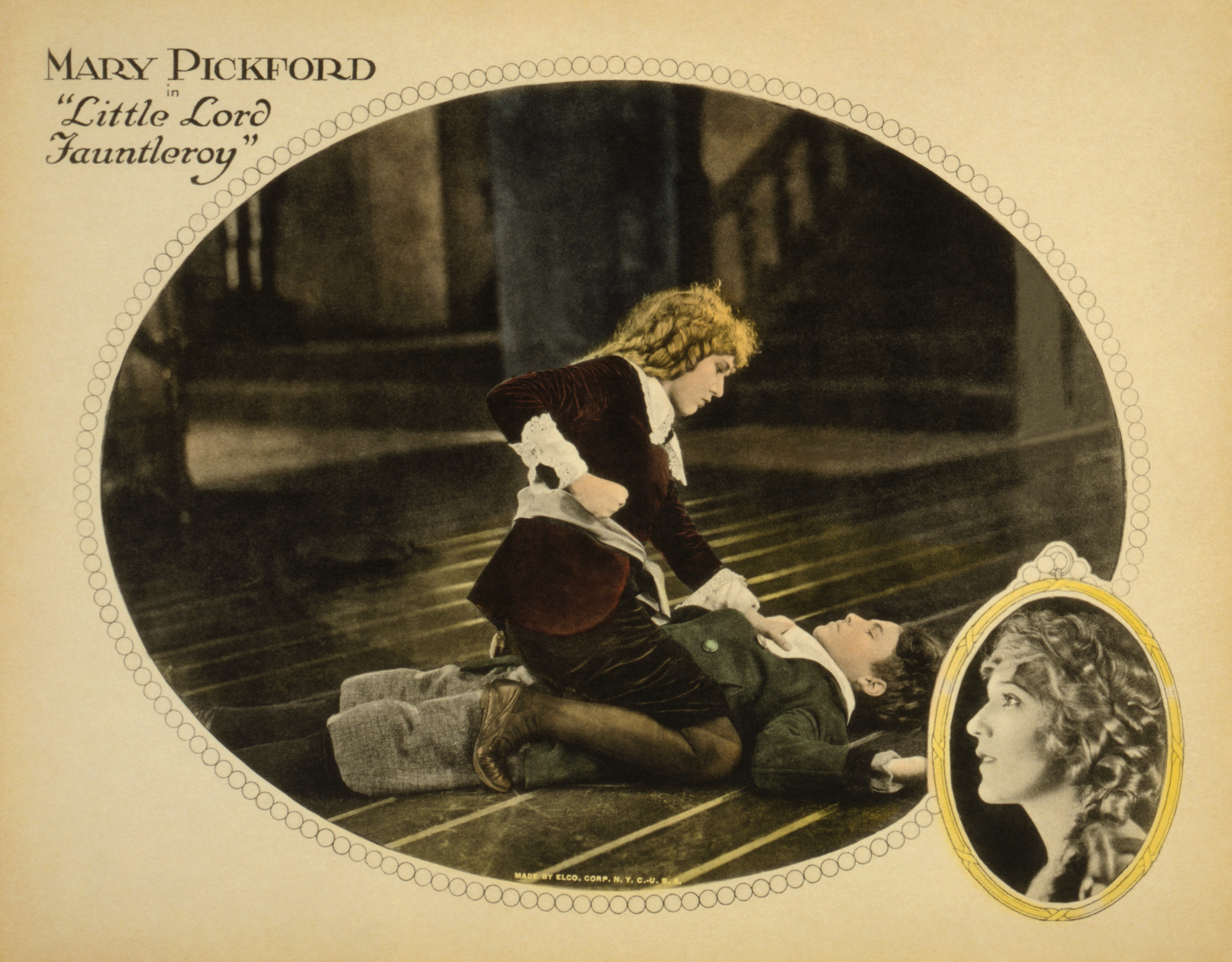
A lobby card for Little Lord Fauntleroy (1921)

The arrival of sound was her undoing. Pickford underestimated the value of adding sound to movies, claiming that "adding sound to movies would be like putting lipstick on the Venus de Milo".

She played a reckless socialite in Coquette (1929), her first talkie, a role for which her famous ringlets were cut into a 1920s bob. Pickford had already cut her hair in the wake of her mother's death in 1928. Fans were shocked at the transformation. Pickford's hair had become a symbol of female virtue, and when she cut it, the act made front-page news in The New York Times and other papers. Coquette was a success and won her an Academy Award for Best Actress, although this was highly controversial. The public failed to respond to her in the more sophisticated roles. Like most movie stars of the silent era, Pickford found her career fading as talkies became more popular among audiences.

Her next film, The Taming of The Shrew, an adaptation of the Shakespeare play, made with husband Douglas Fairbanks, was not well received at the box office, although it has since been more appreciated by critics and viewers. Established Hollywood actors were panicked by the impending arrival of the talkies. On March 29, 1928, The Dodge Brothers Hour was broadcast from Pickford's bungalow, featuring Fairbanks, Chaplin, Norma Talmadge, Gloria Swanson, John Barrymore, D. W. Griffith, and Dolores del Río, among others. They spoke on the radio show to prove that they could meet the challenge of talking movies.

A transition in Pickford's roles came when she was in her late thirties, no longer able to play the children, teenage spitfires, and feisty young women so adored by her fans, and not suited to the glamorous and vampish heroines of early sound. In 1933, she underwent a Technicolor screen test for an animated/live-action film version of Alice in Wonderland, but Walt Disney discarded the project when Paramount Pictures released its own version of the book. Only one Technicolor still of her screen test still exists.

She retired from film acting in 1933 following three costly failures with her last film appearance being Secrets. She appeared on stage in Chicago in 1934 in the play The Church Mouse and went on tour in 1935, starting in Seattle with the stage version of Coquette. She also appeared in a season of radio plays for NBC in 1935 and CBS in 1936. In 1936, she became vice-president of United Artists and continued to produce films for others, including One Rainy Afternoon (1936), The Gay Desperado (1936), Sleep, My Love (1948; with Claudette Colbert), and Love Happy (1949), with the Marx Brothers.

=== The film industry ===
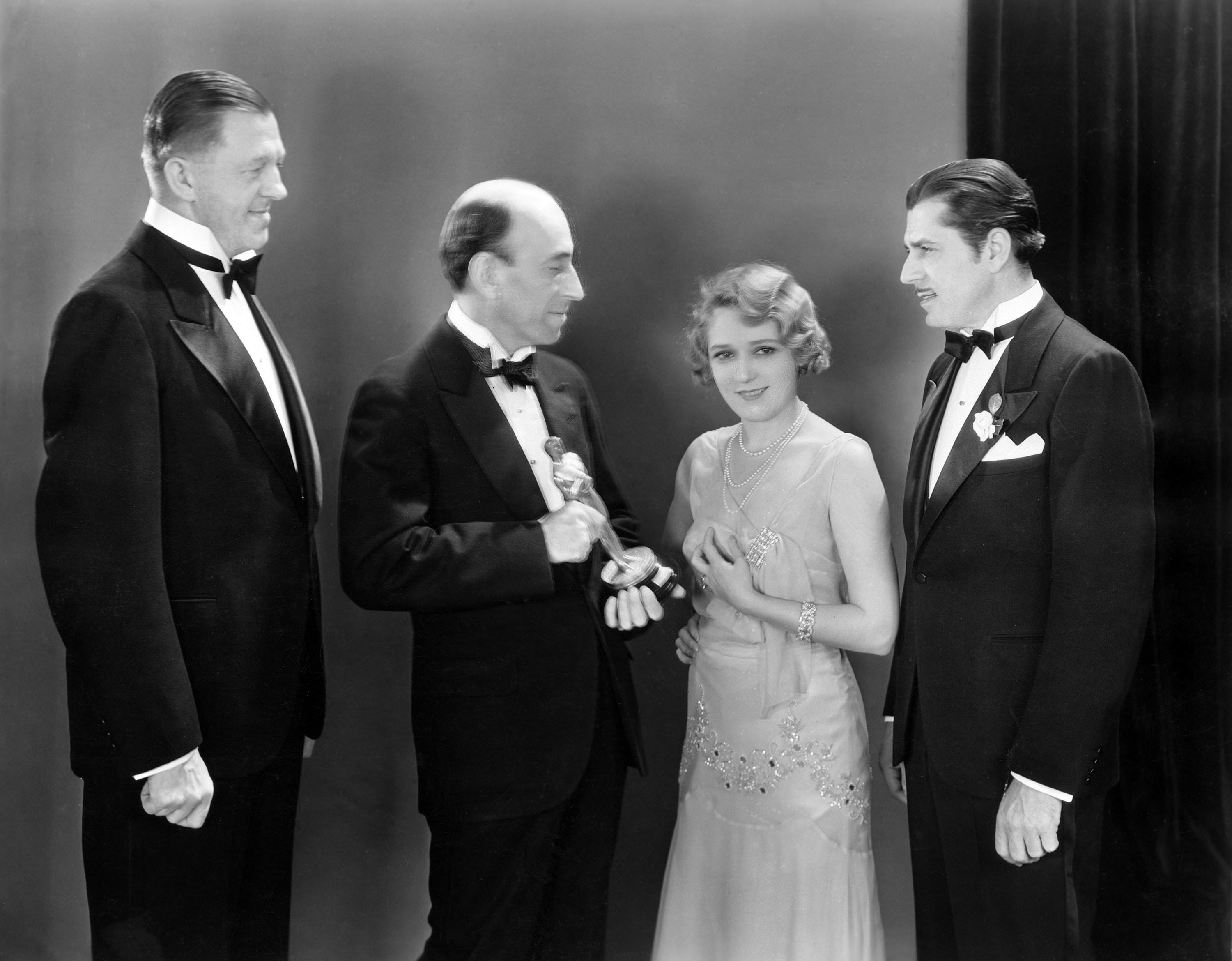
Mary Pickford winning the Academy Award for Best Actress for her role in the 1929 film Coquette, 1930

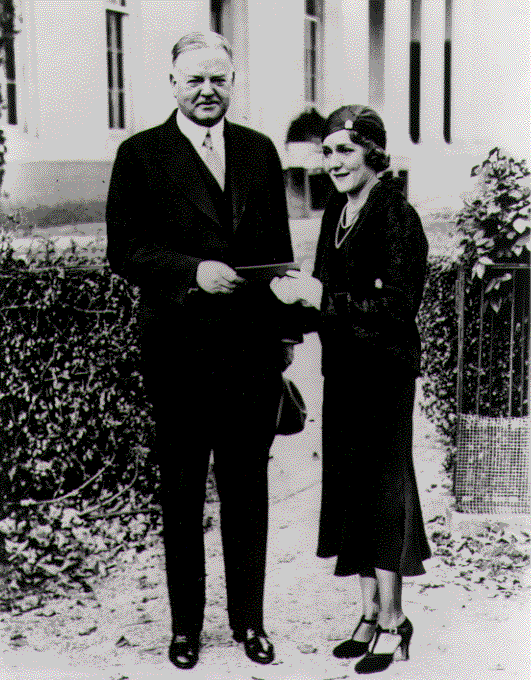
Mary Pickford giving President Herbert Hoover a ticket for a film industry benefit for the unemployed, 1931

Pickford used her stature in the movie industry to promote a variety of causes. Although her image depicted fragility and innocence, she proved to be a strong businesswoman who took control of her career in a cutthroat industry.

During World War I, she promoted the sale of liberty bonds, making an intensive series of fund-raising speeches, beginning in Washington, D.C., where she sold bonds alongside Charlie Chaplin, Douglas Fairbanks, Theda Bara, and Marie Dressler. Five days later, she spoke on Wall Street to an estimated 50,000 people. Though Canadian-born, she was a powerful symbol of American culture, kissing the American flag for cameras and auctioning one of her world-famous curls for $15,000. In a single speech in Chicago, she sold an estimated five million dollars' worth of bonds. She was christened the U.S. Navy's official "Little Sister"; the Army named two cannons after her and made her an honorary colonel.

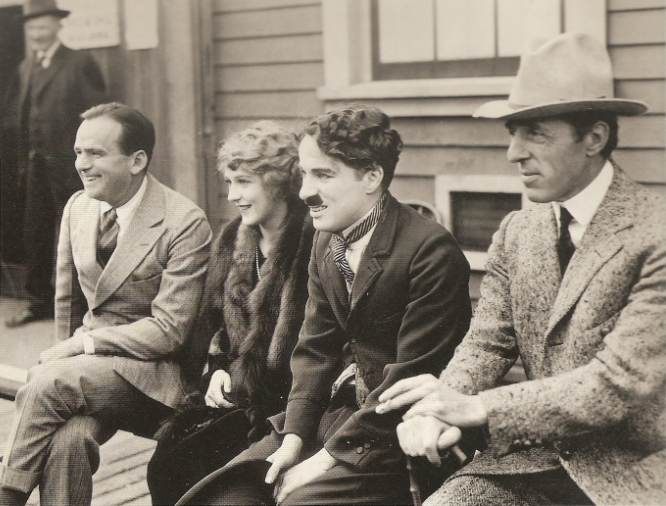
Douglas Fairbanks, Mary Pickford, Charlie Chaplin, and D. W. Griffith, who founded United Artists in 1919

In 1916, Pickford and Constance Adams DeMille, wife of director Cecil B. DeMille, helped found the Hollywood Studio Club, a dormitory for young women involved in the motion picture business. At the end of World War I, Pickford conceived of the Motion Picture Relief Fund, an organization to help financially needy actors. Leftover funds from her work selling Liberty Bonds were put toward its creation, and in 1921, the Motion Picture Relief Fund (MPRF) was officially incorporated, with Joseph Schenck voted its first president and Pickford its vice president. In 1932, Pickford spearheaded the "Payroll Pledge Program", a payroll-deduction plan for studio workers who gave one-half of one percent of their earnings to the MPRF. As a result, in 1940, the Fund was able to purchase land and build the Motion Picture Country House and Hospital, in Woodland Hills, California.

An astute businesswoman, Pickford became her own producer within three years of her feature debut. According to her Foundation, "she oversaw every aspect of the making of her films, from hiring talent and crew to overseeing the script, the shooting, the editing, to the final release and promotion of each project". She demanded (and received) these powers in 1916, when she was under contract to Zukor's Famous Players in Famous Plays (later Paramount). Zukor acquiesced to her refusal to participate in block-booking, the widespread practice of forcing an exhibitor to show a studio's bad film, choosing to also be able to show a Pickford film. In 1916, Pickford's films were distributed singly through a special distribution unit called Artcraft. The Mary Pickford Corporation was briefly Pickford's motion-picture production company.

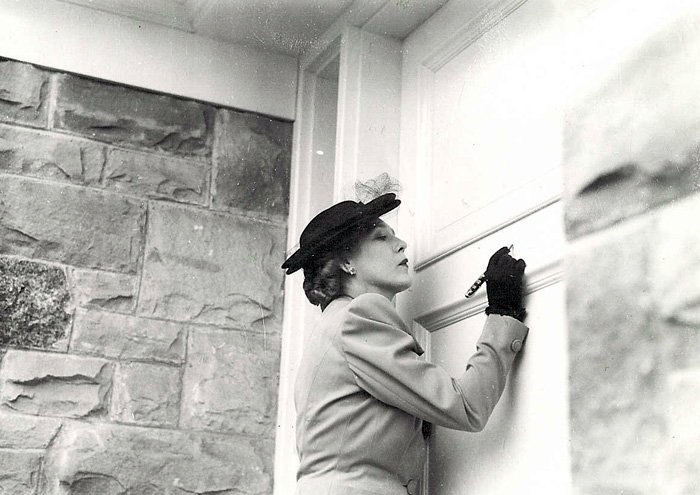
Bungalow Mary Pickford War Funds, 1943

In 1919, she increased her power by co-founding United Artists (UA) with Charlie Chaplin, D. W. Griffith, and her soon-to-be husband, Douglas Fairbanks. Before UA's creation, Hollywood studios were vertically integrated, not only producing films but forming chains of theaters. Distributors (also part of the studios) arranged for company productions to be shown in the company's movie venues. Filmmakers relied on the studios for bookings; in return, they put up with what many considered creative interference.

United Artists broke from this tradition. It was solely a distribution company, offering independent film producers access to its own screens as well as the rental of temporarily unbooked cinemas owned by other companies. In 1919, Pickford established The Mary Pickford Company, which was devoted exclusively to producing films distributed by United Artists. The film Pollyanna was Mary's first film distributed by United Artists. Pickford and Fairbanks produced and shot their films after 1920 at the jointly owned Pickford-Fairbanks studio on Santa Monica Boulevard. The producers who signed with UA were true independents, producing, creating, and controlling their work to an unprecedented degree. As a co-founder, producer, and star of her own films, Pickford became the most powerful woman ever to work in Hollywood. By 1930, her acting career had largely faded. After retiring three years later, however, she continued to produce films for United Artists. She and Chaplin remained partners in the company for decades. Chaplin left the company in 1955, and Pickford followed suit in 1956, selling her remaining shares for $3 million.

She had purchased the rights to many of her early silent films with the intention of burning them on her death, but in 1970 she agreed to donate 50 of her Biograph films to the American Film Institute. In 1976, she received an Academy Honorary Award for her contribution to American film.

== Personal life ==
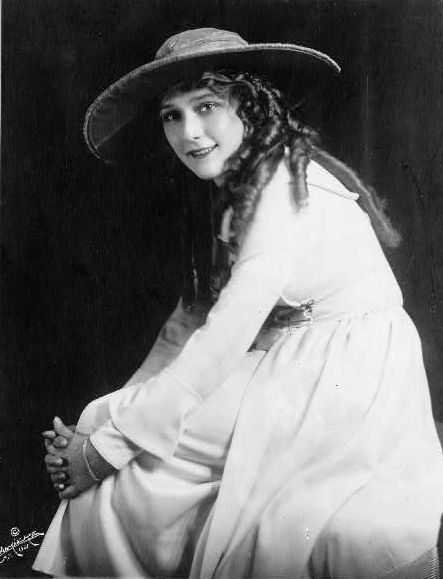
Mary Pickford, 1921

Pickford was married three times. She married Owen Moore, an Irish-born silent film actor, on January 7, 1911. It is rumored that she became pregnant by Moore in the early 1910s and had a miscarriage or an abortion. Some accounts suggest this resulted in her later inability to have children. The couple's marriage was strained by Moore's alcoholism, insecurity about living in the shadow of Pickford's fame, and bouts of domestic violence. The couple lived together on-and-off for several years.

Pickford became secretly involved in a relationship with Douglas Fairbanks. They toured the U.S. together in 1918 to promote Liberty Bond sales for the World War I effort. Around this time, Pickford also suffered from the flu during the 1918 flu pandemic. Pickford divorced Moore on March 2, 1920, after she agreed to his $100,000 demand for a settlement ($1.5 million in 2023, adjusted for inflation). She married Fairbanks just days later on March 28, 1920, in what was described as the "marriage of the century" and they were referred to as the King and Queen of Hollywood. They went to Europe for their honeymoon; fans in London and in Paris caused riots trying to get to the famous couple. The couple's triumphant return to Hollywood was witnessed by vast crowds who turned out to hail them at railway stations across the United States.

The Mark of Zorro (1920) and a series of other swashbucklers gave the popular Fairbanks a more romantic, heroic image. Pickford continued to epitomize the virtuous but fiery girl next door. Even at private parties, people instinctively stood up when Pickford entered a room; she and her husband were often referred to as "Hollywood royalty". Their international reputations were broad. Foreign heads of state and dignitaries who visited the White House often asked if they could also visit Pickfair, the couple's mansion in Beverly Hills.

Dinners at Pickfair became celebrity events. Charlie Chaplin, Fairbanks’ best friend, was often present. Other guests included George Bernard Shaw, Albert Einstein, Elinor Glyn, Helen Keller, H. G. Wells, Lord Mountbatten, Fritz Kreisler, Amelia Earhart, F. Scott Fitzgerald, Noël Coward, Max Reinhardt, Baron Nishi, Vladimir Nemirovich-Danchenko, Sir Arthur Conan Doyle, Austen Chamberlain, Sir Harry Lauder, and Meher Baba, among others. However, the public nature of Pickford's second marriage strained it to the breaking point. Both she and Fairbanks had little time off from producing and acting in their films. They were also constantly on display as America's unofficial ambassadors to the world, leading parades, cutting ribbons, and making speeches. When their film careers both began to flounder at the end of the silent era, Fairbanks' restless nature prompted him to travel overseas (something which Pickford did not enjoy). They would separate in 1933, after the beginning of Fairbanks' romance with Sylvia, Lady Ashley, which became public in 1934. They divorced on January 10, 1936. Fairbanks' son, Douglas Fairbanks Jr., by his first wife, claimed his father and Pickford long regretted their inability to reconcile.

On June 24, 1937, Pickford married her third and last husband, actor and band leader Charles "Buddy" Rogers. They adopted two children: Ronald Charles (born 1936, adopted 1943, a.k.a. Ronnie Pickford Rogers), and Roxanne (born 1942, adopted 1944). A PBS American Experience documentary described Pickford's relationship with her children as tense. She criticized their physical imperfections, including Ronnie's small stature and Roxanne's crooked teeth. Both children later said their mother was too self-absorbed to provide real maternal love. In 2003, Ronnie recalled that "Things didn't work out that much, you know. But I'll never forget her. I think that she was a good woman".

In 1948, Pickford and Rogers built a seven-bedroom, eight-bathroom, 6,050-square-foot (562 m^{2}) estate on 2.12 acres (8,600 m^{2}) at the B Bar H Ranch, California, where they lived and then later sold.

=== Political views ===
Pickford supported Thomas Dewey in the 1944 United States presidential election, Barry Goldwater in the 1964 United States presidential election, and Ronald Reagan in his race for governor in 1966. She was a charter member of the Hollywood Republican Committee.

=== Later years and death ===
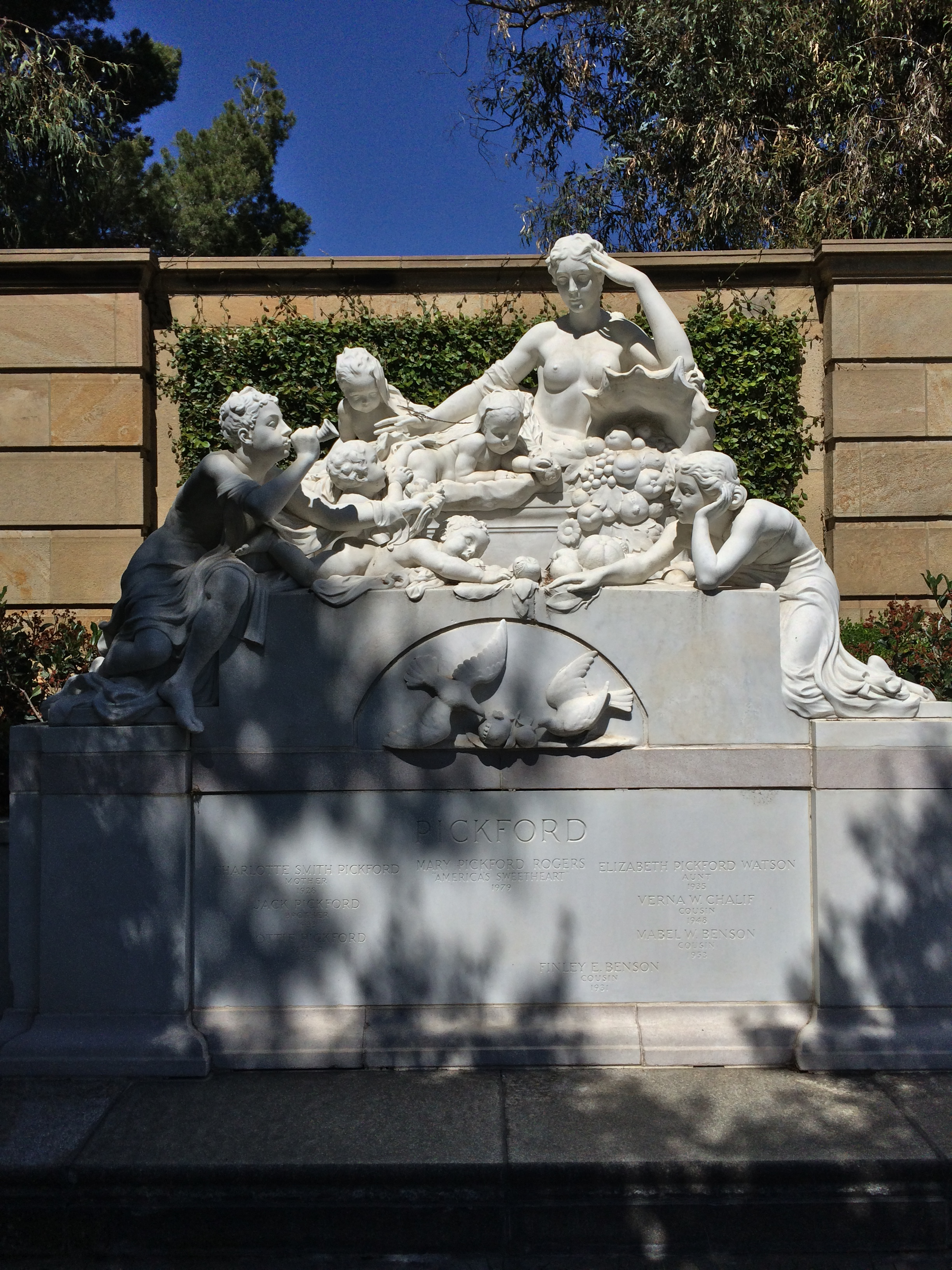
The tomb of actress Mary Pickford in the Garden of Memory, Forest Lawn Glendale

After retiring from the screen, Pickford became an alcoholic, as her father had been. Her mother, Charlotte, died of breast cancer in March 1928. Her siblings, Jack and Lottie, died of alcohol-related causes in 1933 and 1936. These deaths, her divorce from Fairbanks, and the end of silent films left Pickford deeply depressed. Her relationship with her adopted children, Roxanne and Ronald, was turbulent at best. Pickford withdrew and gradually became a recluse, remaining almost entirely at Pickfair and allowing visits only from Lillian Gish, her stepson Douglas Fairbanks Jr., and a few select others. In 1955, she published her memoirs, Sunshine and Shadow. She had previously published Why Not Try God in 1934, an essay on spirituality and personal growth, My Rendezvous with Life (1935), an essay on death and her belief in an afterlife and also a novel in 1935, The Demi-Widow.

In the mid-1960s, Pickford often received visitors only by telephone, speaking to them from her bedroom. Charles "Buddy" Rogers often gave guests tours of Pickfair, including views of a genuine western bar Pickford had bought for Douglas Fairbanks, and a portrait of Pickford in the drawing room. A print of this image now hangs in the Library of Congress. When Pickford received an Academy Honorary Award in 1976, the Academy sent a TV crew to her house to record her short statement of thanks—offering the public a very rare glimpse into Pickfair Manor. Charitable events continued to be held at Pickfair, including an annual Christmas party for blind war veterans, mostly from World War I.

Pickford automatically acquired American citizenship when she married Fairbanks, an American citizen, in 1920, two years before the Cable Act of 1922 required a naturalization process for married female partners of U.S. male citizens. She never filed papers to acquire naturalized U.S. citizenship. Her agent at MGM, William A. Orr, reported to the US Congress in 1932 that Pickford was an American citizen. Pickford also mistakenly believed that she had ceased to be a British subject upon marrying Fairbanks. However, she held and traveled under British and later (beginning in 1947) Canadian passports which she renewed regularly at the British and Canadian consulates in Los Angeles, but she never acquired an American passport nor took out papers for naturalization as an American citizen. She also owned a house in Toronto, Ontario, Canada, as well as a property on Yonge Street in Toronto, and spent her summer holidays in Banff, Alberta, Canada. Towards the end of her life, Pickford made arrangements with the Canadian Department of Citizenship to officially acquire Canadian citizenship because she wished to "die as a Canadian". Canadian authorities were unsure whether she had ever lost her Canadian citizenship, given her passport status, but her request was approved, and she was issued official Canadian citizenship documents.

On May 29, 1979, Pickford died at a Santa Monica hospital of complications from a cerebral hemorrhage she had suffered the week before. She was interred in the Garden of Memory of the Forest Lawn Memorial Park cemetery in Glendale, California.

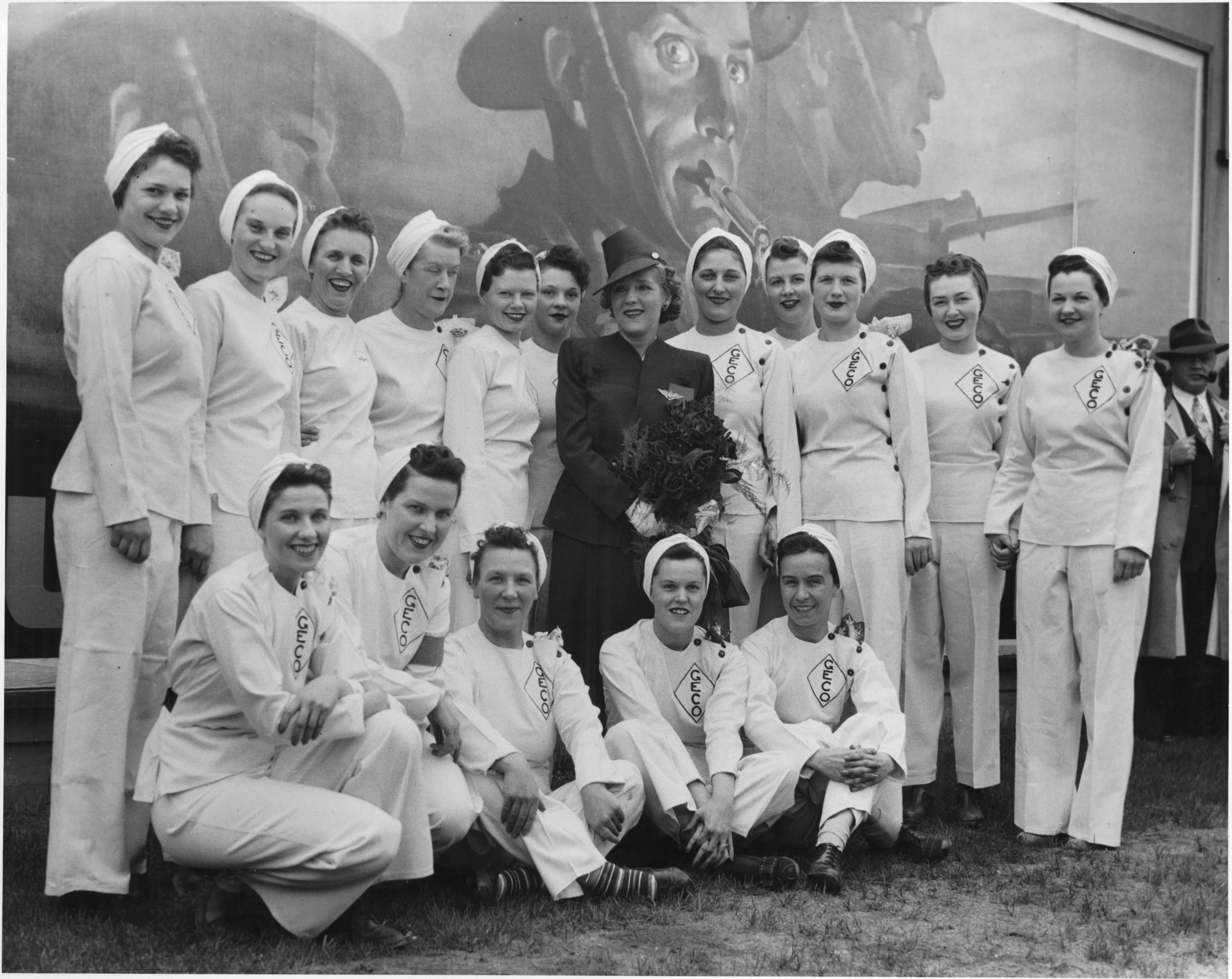
Mary Pickford posing with a group of employees during her visit to the General Engineering Company (Canada) munitions factory on June 5, 1943

=== Pickford and Toronto ===
Although the Smith family left Toronto permanently in 1902, Pickford regularly returned. When performing at the Royal Alexandra Theatre in 1909, she stayed with her grandmother Mrs. Sara Smith. In 1924, she visited her birth home and was photographed for postcards. She also visited the Christie Street Hospital to visit sick soldiers and visit the graves of her father and grandparents in Mount Pleasant Cemetery.

As Pickford's fame grew, her birth home on University Avenue was regularly visited by tour buses. However, by 1938, her birth home was boarded up and vacant, waiting for urban renewal in The Ward. Pickford inquired about purchasing it, but remarked that she "would have to buy the whole block". The home was demolished in 1943, and 20 bricks were sent to Pickford in California.

Pickford owned a house on Dewson Street, where her aunt lived. This house was sold for CA$5,000 and the proceeds donated to build a bungalow in Toronto's East York suburb. The bungalow was the first prize in a lottery in Toronto to benefit war charities, and Pickford unveiled the home on May 26, 1943. Pickford also owned a property on Yonge Street. A bust and historical plaque mark her birthplace in Toronto, now the site of the Hospital for Sick Children. The plaque was unveiled by her husband, Buddy Rogers, in 1973. The bust by artist Eino Gira was added ten years later. Her date of birth is stated on the plaque as April 8, 1893. This can only be assumed to be because her date of birth was never registered; throughout her life, beginning as a child, she led many people to believe that she was a year younger than her real age, so that she appeared to be more of an acting prodigy and continued to be cast in younger roles, which were more plentiful in the theatre.

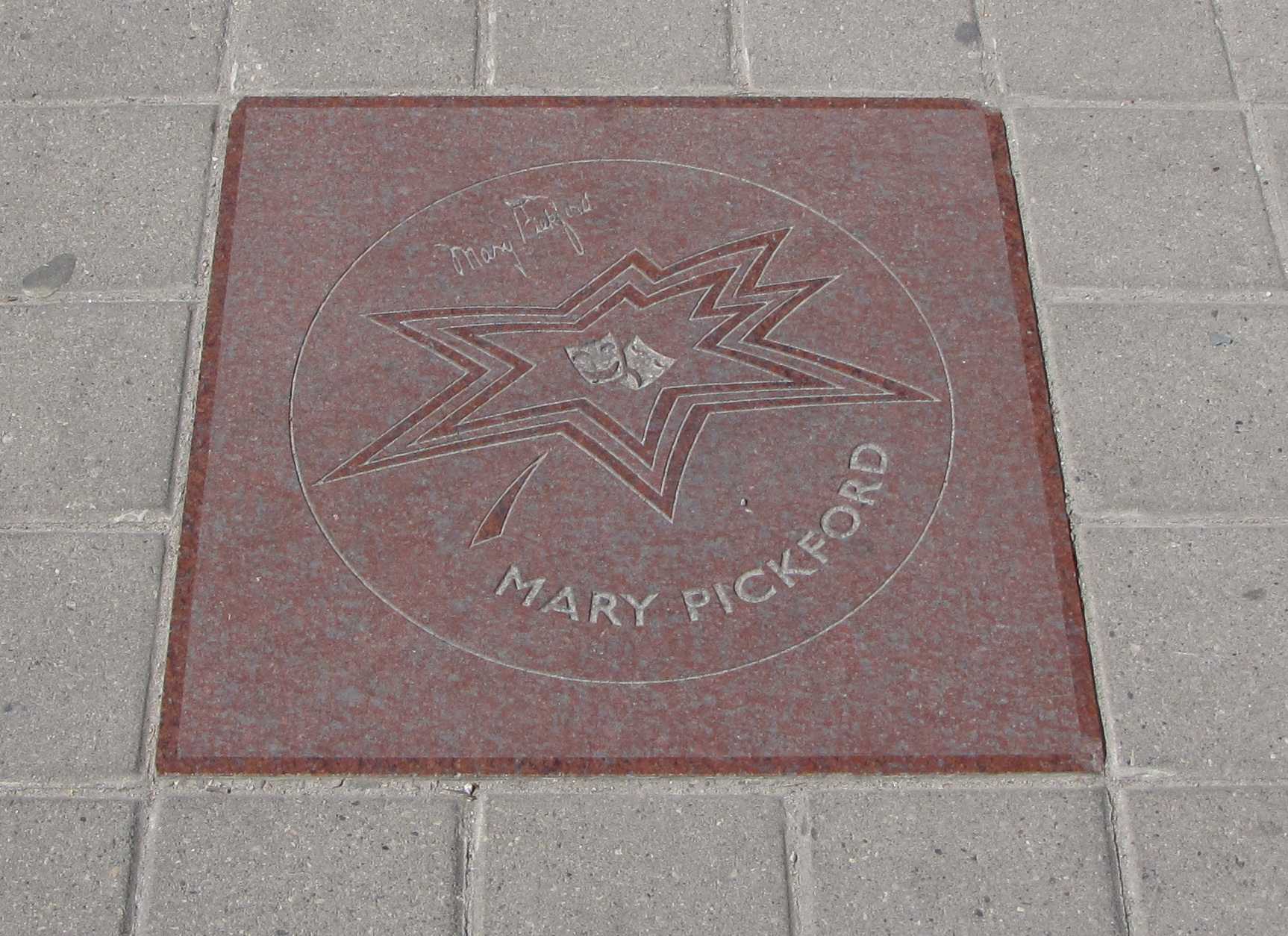
Pickford's star on the Walk of Fame in Toronto

Pickford received a posthumous star on Canada's Walk of Fame in Toronto in 1999.

From January 2011 until July 2011, the Toronto International Film Festival (TIFF) exhibited a collection of Mary Pickford memorabilia in the Canadian Film Gallery of the TIFF Bell LightBox building. In February 2011, the Spadina Museum, dedicated to the 1920s and 1930s era in Toronto, staged performances of Sweetheart: The Mary Pickford Story, a one-woman musical based on the life and career of Pickford.

On August 20, 2019, TIFF announced Mati Diop as the recipient of the first Mary Pickford Award, an award "for outstanding female talent". The award has since been renamed the "TIFF Emerging Talent Award".

Pickford has been portrayed twice in the Canadian television period detective series Murdoch Mysteries. She was first played by Peyton Kennedy in the stand-alone Christmas special "A Merry Murdoch Christmas" (December 21, 2015). Pickford again appears in episode 12 of season 15 "There's Something About Mary" (January 3, 2022), portrayed by Eva Foote.

== Legacies ==
=== Academy of Motion Picture Arts and Sciences ===
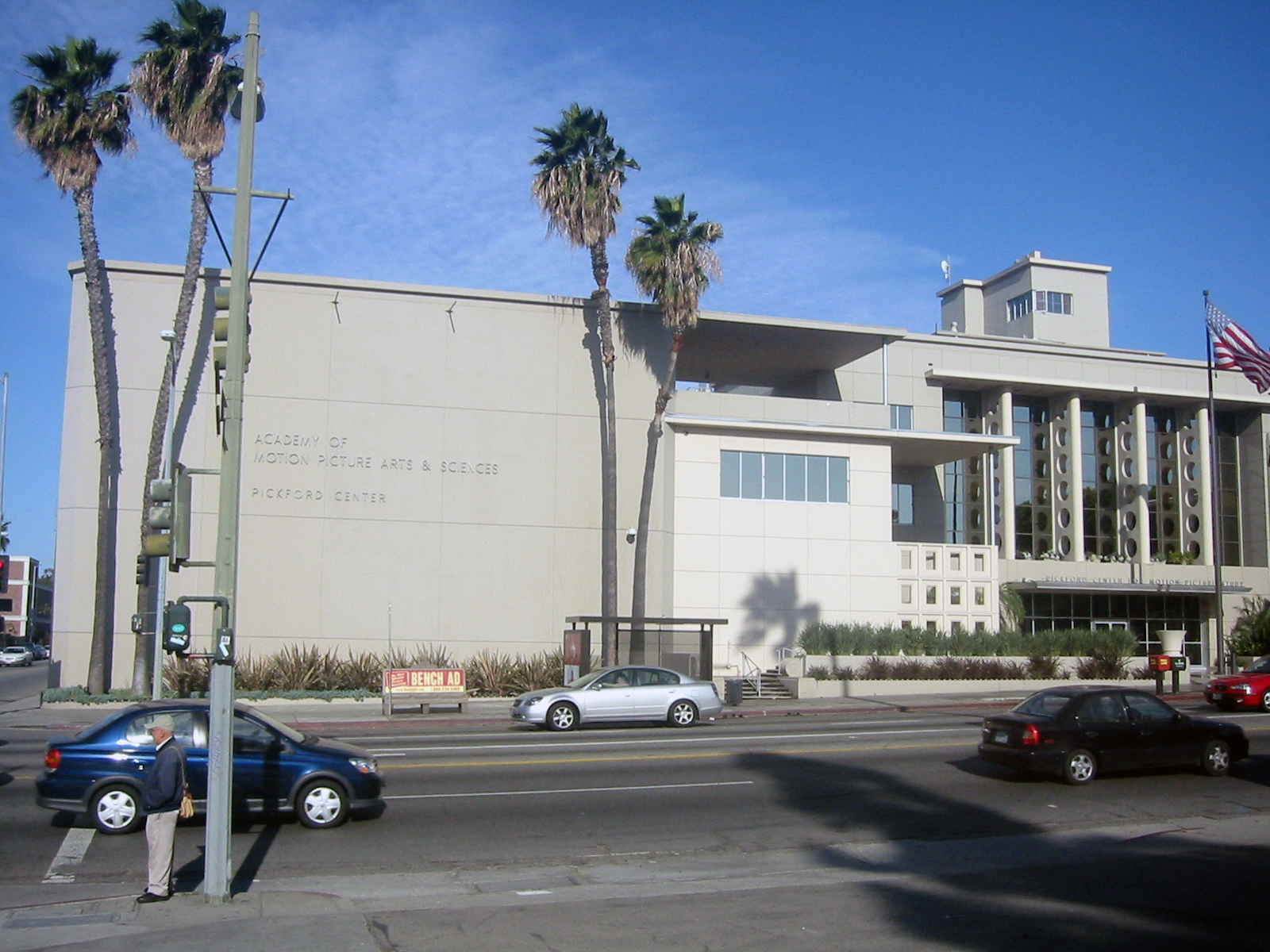
Pickford Center for Motion Picture Study in Hollywood, California

The Pickford Center for Motion Picture Study at 1313 Vine Street in Hollywood was dedicated in her honor by the Academy of Motion Picture Arts and Sciences. It opened in 1948 as a radio and television studio facility and was bought by the Academy to house the Center. The Center houses the academy's film archive.

In 2007, the Academy of Motion Picture Arts and Sciences sued the estate of the deceased Buddy Rogers' second wife, Beverly Rogers, in order to stop the public sale of one of Pickford's Oscars.

=== In Walks of Fames ===
Pickford was awarded a star in the category of motion pictures on the Hollywood Walk of Fame at 6280 Hollywood Blvd.

Her handprints and footprints are displayed at Grauman's Chinese Theatre in Hollywood, California. Although the theater's official account credits Norma Talmadge as having inspired the theater's tradition of putting footprints in concrete when she accidentally stepped into wet concrete, in a short interview during the September 13, 1937, Lux Radio Theatre broadcast of a radio adaptation of A Star Is Born, Sid Grauman related another version of how he got the idea to put hand and foot prints in the concrete, involving Pickford. He said it was "pure accident. I walked right into it. While we were building the theatre, I accidentally happened to step in some soft concrete. And there it was. So, I went to Mary Pickford immediately. Mary put her foot into it".

In 1993, a Golden Palm Star on the Palm Springs Walk of Stars was dedicated to her.

Pickford became a member of Canada's Walk of Fame in 1999.

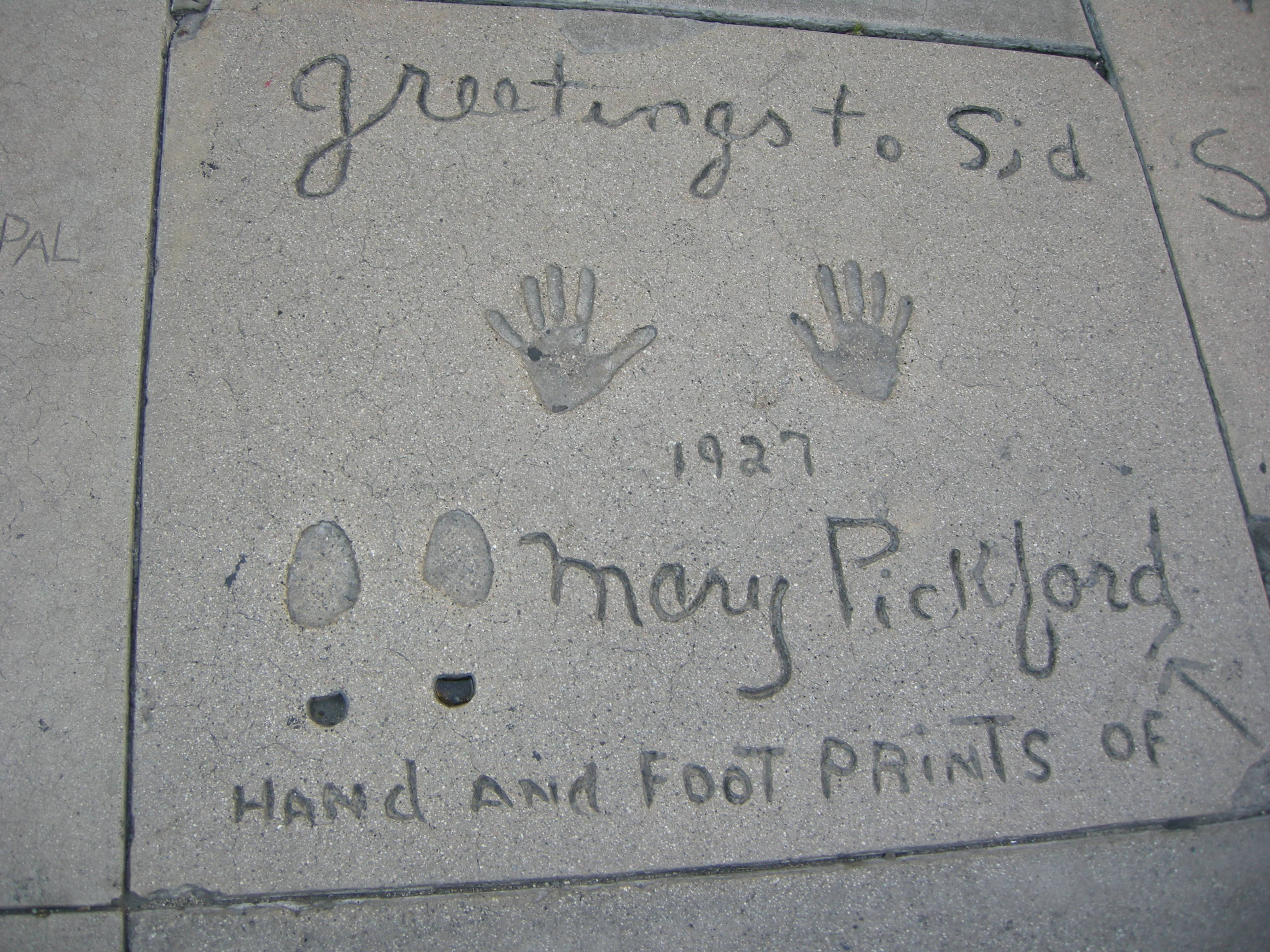
Pickford's handprints and footprints at Grauman's Chinese Theatre in Hollywood, California

=== Buildings ===
The Mary Pickford Theater at the James Madison Memorial Building of the Library of Congress is named in her honor.

The Mary Pickford Auditorium at Claremont McKenna College in Claremont, California is named in her honor.

A first-run movie theatre in Cathedral City, California, called The Mary Pickford Theatre, was established on May 25, 2001. Built in the shape of a Spanish cathedral, the theatre has several screens, a bell tower, and a three-story lobby. The lobby contains a historic display featuring original artifacts belonging to Pickford and to her last husband, Buddy Rogers. Among them is a beaded gown she wore in the film Dorothy Vernon of Haddon Hall (1924) designed by Mitchell Leisen, her special Oscar, and a jewelry box.

=== Mary Pickford Foundation ===
External videos
- 1912 silent Biograph film The School Teacher and the Waif Restored by Mary Pickford Foundation

Since 2013, the Mary Pickford Foundation has sponsored The Pickford Composers and The Pickford Ensemble at Pepperdine University. These programs train students in creating music for live accompaniment to silent films.

On December 20, 2013, film historian Jeffrey Vance announced in an interview he is working with the Mary Pickford Foundation on what will be her official biography.

=== In media ===
Pickford is represented in Hergé's Tintin in America volume of the Tintin comic series.

The 1980 stage musical The Biograph Girl, about the silent film era, features the character of Pickford.

The Google Doodle of April 8, 2017, commemorated Mary Pickford's 125th birthday.

The Girls in the Picture, a 2018 novel by Melanie Benjamin, is a historical fiction about the friendship of Mary Pickford and screenwriter Frances Marion.

Pickford was featured on a Canadian postage stamp in 2006.

In 2022, Pickford was portrayed by Christina Leonardi in Titans: The Rise of Hollywood.

Pickford is represented in a Christmas Special episode of the television police series "Murdoch Mysteries" (a.k.a. The Artful Detective).

=== Other legacies ===
The "Mary Pickford cocktail" was created during the Prohibition era in her name. It has been attributed variously to bartenders Eddie Woelke or Fred Kaufmann of the Hotel Nacional de Cuba, during a trip Pickford made to Cuba.

The Pickford Film Center, located in Bellingham, Washington, is a non-profit art house cinema and education center that is named in honor of Mary Pickford.

In 2013, a copy of an early Pickford film that was thought to be lost (Their First Misunderstanding) was found by Peter Massie, a carpenter tearing down an abandoned barn in New Hampshire. It was donated to Keene State College and is undergoing restoration by the Library of Congress for exhibition. The film is notable as being the first in which Pickford was credited by name.

== Awards and honors ==
Year	Organization	Work	Category	Result	Ref.
1930	Academy Awards	Coquette	Best Actress	Won	
1960	Hollywood Walk of Fame	—N/a	Star - Motion Pictures	Honored	
1975	Academy Awards	—N/a	Academy Honorary Award	Honored	
1999	Canada's Walk of Fame	—N/a	—N/a	Honored	

== See also ==
- Timeline of Mary Pickford
- List of actors with Academy Award nominations

== Sources ==
- Adams, Katherine H.; Keene, Michael L.; Koella, Jennifer C. (2011). Seeing the American Woman, 1880–1920: The Social Impact of the Visual Media Explosion. McFarland.
- Affron, Charles (2002). Lillian Gish: Her Legend, Her Life. University of California Press. ISBN 978-0-520-23434-5.
- Balio, Tino (1985). The American Film Industry. University of Wisconsin Press. p. 159. ISBN 978-0-299-09873-5.
- Blum, Daniel C. (1986). A Pictorial History of the American Theatre, 1860–1985. New York: Crown Publishers. ISBN 978-0-517-56258-1.
- Brownlow, Kevin (1999). Mary Pickford Rediscovered. Harry N. Abrams. ISBN 978-0-8109-4374-2.
- Critchlow, Donald T. (2013). When Hollywood Was Right: How Movie Stars, Studio Moguls, and Big Business Remade American Politics. Cambridge University Press. ISBN 978-1-107-65028-2.
- Filey, Mike (2002). A Toronto Album 2: More Glimpses of the City That Was. Dundurn Press Ltd. ISBN 978-1-55002-393-0.
- Herndon, Booton (1977). Mary Pickford and Douglas Fairbanks: The Most Popular Couple the World Has Ever Known. New York: W. W. Norton & Company, Inc. ISBN 978-0-393-07508-3.
- Leavey, Peggy Dymond (2011). Mary Pickford: Canada's Silent Siren, America's Sweetheart. Toronto, Canada: Dundurn. ISBN 978-1-4597-0076-5.
- Pickford, Mary (1955). Sunshine and Shadow, An Autobiography. Foreword by Cecil B. DeMille. Garden City, NY: Doubleday & Company. OCLC 1087225193.
- Shipman, David (1995). The Great Movie Stars: The Golden Years. Warner Books. ISBN 978-0-7515-0809-3.
- Whitfield, Eileen (1997). Pickford: The Woman Who Made Hollywood. University Press of Kentucky. ISBN 978-0-8131-2045-4.
