= Star Theatre (New York City, built 1901) =

Former theatre in Manhattan, New York

The Star Theatre, also known as The New Star Theatre, was a Broadway theatre located at the corner of Lexington Avenue and 107th Street in New York City, New York, United States. Built in 1901, it was active as a Broadway playhouse through 1908. It should not be confused with the earlier Star Theatre demolished in 1901.

== History ==
The New York impresario and theatre agent William T. Keogh (died 1947), previously connected with the Knickerbocker Theatre, was responsible for the building of the Star Theatre which began construction in August 1901. The theatre was designed by the architects Thomas P. Neville and George A. Bagge of the New York firm Neville & Bagge. It was built by Delaney Brothers & Co. The theatre opened with a performance of the Hanlon Brothers's Superba, a production which ran at that theatre from its grand opening on December 30, 1901, through January 4, 1902.

In 1909 the theatre began showing silent films on Sundays while continuing with live performance, usually melodramas, during the week.

== Notable productions ==
- The Gypsy Girl (1905, Hal Reid; starred Mary Pickford, then known as Gladys Smith, as Freckles)
