= The Gypsy Girl (play) =

The Gypsy Girl is a play in four acts by Hal Reid. The play also includes incidental music by composer Alfred G. Robyn, and one song, "Swinging Under the Old Oak Tree", written by Louis Mortimer and Walter McClean which was sung by Dolly Kemper who portrayed the title heroine in the show. The work follows the adventures of Daisy Dean, "the Gypsy Girl", and her friends as they attempt to reacquire treasure stolen from the gypsies and thwart assassins threatening Daisy's life.

== Performance history ==
The Gypsy Girl premiered in Camden, New Jersey on March 2, 1905. It then transferred to Broadway where it opened at the Star Theatre on April 3, 1905. The work notably featured a young Mary Pickford, then acting under her birth name Gladys Smith, in the supporting role of the boy Freckles. After it left Broadway, the play toured the United States with Pickford in the cast.
