= The Female of the Species (film) =

1912 film

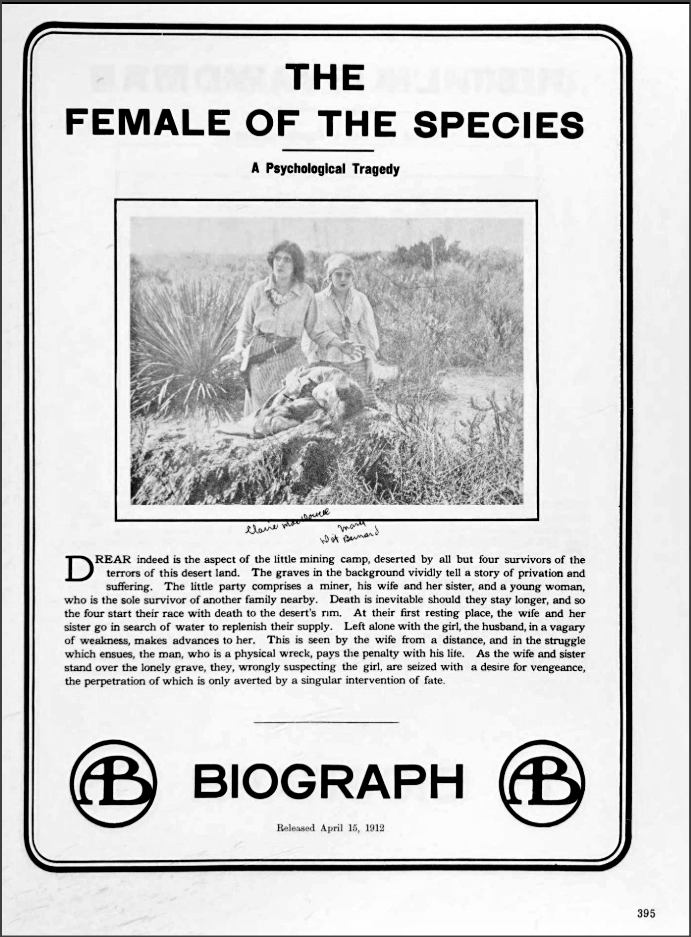
- 1912 Biograph Ad
- Directed by: D. W. Griffith
- Produced by: Biograph Company
- Starring: Claire McDowell; Mary Pickford
- Cinematography: G. W. Bitzer
- Production company: Biograph Company
- Distributed by: General Film Company
- Release date: April 15, 1912
- Running time: 17 minutes
- Country: United States
- Language: Silent (English intertitles)

The Female of the Species is a 1912 American short silent drama film directed by D. W. Griffith for the Biograph Company.

== Plot ==
A miner, his wife and sister and one other woman, the sole survivors of a mining camp massacre, set out on a "race with death" across the harsh desert. The man appears to be injured, as he clings to the mule carrying their supplies. Despite their perilous situation, while the wife and sister are looking for water, the miner tries to embrace the other woman, who resists. The wife returns and attacks the woman. In his effort to separate them, the miner dies. The grief-stricken wife blames the other woman. Half-maddened by their ordeal, the wife and sister become obsessed with thoughts of vengeance and murder. The next day, they continue on.

Meanwhile, an Indian couple and their baby are desperately in need of water. Coming upon two sleeping white men, he steals a canteen, but they wake and shoot him dead. His woman dies of thirst.

Exhausted, the other woman falls asleep. The wife considers killing her, but decides against it, until her sister urges her to do it. She stands over the sleeper with an axe in her hand, still undecided. Just then, they hear the baby's cries. The wife runs and finds the child in the arms of the dead mother. She throws away her axe to pick up the baby. When the other woman wakes and joins them, the wife listens to her pleadings, then embraces her.

== Cast ==
- Charles West as The Miner
- Claire McDowell as The Miner's Wife
- Mary Pickford as The Miner's Wife's Sister
- Dorothy Bernard as The Other Woman

Griffith did not cast Pickford for her usual role as victim; instead he gave her the part of the villain, who urges her sister to commit cold-blooded murder.

== See also ==
- List of American films of 1912
- D. W. Griffith filmography
- Mary Pickford filmography
