= Cardinal Wolsey (film) =

1912 silent film directed by Laurence Trimble

- Directed by: Laurence Trimble
- Written by: Hal Reid
- Based on: the play Henry VIII by William Shakespeare
- Produced by: Vitagraph Company of America
- Starring: Hal Reid; Clara Kimball Young; Tefft Johnson; Julia Swayne Gordon
- Distributed by: General Film Company
- Release date: March 5, 1912
- Running time: 1 reel
- Country: USA
- Language: Silent..English titles

Cardinal Wolsey is a 1912 silent short film drama directed by Laurence Trimble, written by and starring Hal Reid. It was based on the play Henry VIII by William Shakespeare. It was produced by the Vitagraph Company of America and distributed through the General Film Company.

An incomplete copy of the film is preserved in the National Film and Television Archive, British Film Institute.

== Cast ==
- Hal Reid - Cardinal Wolsey
- Julia Swayne Gordon - Catherine of Aragon
- Clara Kimball Young - Anne Boleyn
- Tefft Johnson - King Henry VIII
- Robert Gaillard - Gardiner, later Bishop of Winchester
- Logan Paul - Thomas Cranmer, Archbishop of Canterbury
- George Ober - Bishop of Essex
- Hal Wilson - King's friend (*Harold Wilson)
