= Hal Reid (actor) =

American actor and dramatist (1863-1920)

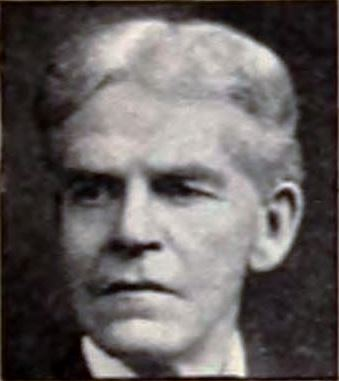
- From a 1922 magazine
- Born: James Halleck Reid; April 14, 1863; Saint Omer, Indiana
- Died: May 22, 1920 (aged 57); New York City, New York
- Occupations: Playwright, Actor
- Years active: 1880s–1920
- Spouses: Marylee Withers Cole (m. 1879) Bertha Belle Westbrook (m. 1889) Marcella Frances Russell Timer (m. 1916)
- Children: Wallace Reid

James Halleck Reid (April 14, 1863 – May 22, 1920) was an American playwright and stage and screen actor. Reid also directed over a dozen films.

== Early life and career ==
Born in 1863, in Saint Omer, Indiana, and raised in Cedarville, Ohio, Reid was the son of dentist Hugh McMillan Reid and America Elizabeth Truitt.

Reid entered the film business in 1910 as an actor, director, and writer, bringing along his teen son Wallace Reid, who had aspirations to be a director or cameraman. Many of his plays saw Broadway openings.

In 1912, Reid was appointed Censor to the Universal Film Corporation.

Reid was at one time said to be actually Harry Preston and that he had served a prison sentence for an unspecified crime. In 1915 Reid visited Leo Frank in a Georgia prison for source material for a film he was making titled Thou Shall Not Kill. Frank was convicted, then kidnapped and lynched for the 1913 murder of Mary Phagan. He was posthumously pardoned in 1986.

Reid married Bertha Westbrook, who collaborated with him on some of his writing. Film actor Wallace Reid was their son.

== Selected plays ==
- At Cripple Creek
- A Mother's Love (1903)
- A Child Wife
- Custer's Last Fight (1905)
- For Love of a Woman
- Human Hearts (original title Logan's Luck, 1895)
- In Convict Stripes
- Knobs o'Tennessee (1899)
- A Working Girl's Wrong (1903)
- A Wife for a Day
- A Wife's Secret (1903)
- For a Human Life (1906)
- A Millionaire's Revenge (1906)
- The Prince of the World
- The Avenger (1907)
- The Gypsy Girl (1905)
- The Shoemaker (1907)
- Sweet Molly O! (1907)
- The Cow Puncher (1906)
- Roanoak
- The Peddler (1902)
- The German Immigrants
- The Heart of Virginia
- The Singing Girl from Killarney (1907)
- The Pride of Newspaper Row
- From Broadway to Bowery (1907)

== Filmography ==
- The Girl from Arizona (1910), short
- Becket (1910), short
- Human Hearts (1910), short
- Wig Wag (1911), short
- One Touch of Nature (1911), short
- The Path of True Love (1912), short
- Jean Intervenes (1912), short
- Indian Romeo and Juliet (1912), short
- The Hobo's Redemption (1912), short
- Cardinal Wolsey (1912), short
- Father Beauclaire (1912), short
- Virginius (1912), short
- A Nation's Peril (1912), short
- Rip Van Winkle (1912), short
- Every Inch a Man (1912), short
- The Deerslayer (1913), short
- Dan (1914)
- Time Lock No. 776 (1915)
- Mothers of Men (1917)
- Little Miss Hoover (1918)
- The Two Brides (1919)

== Film Director ==
- The Victoria Cross (1912) *short
- Old Love Letters (1912)*short
- Love in the Ghetto (1912)*short
- Father Beauclaire (1912)*short
- Curfew Shall Not Ring Tonight (1912)*short
- Kaintuck(1912)*short
- Virginius (1912)*short
- Votes for Women (1912)*short
- A Man's Duty (1912)*short
- At Cripple Creek (1912)*short
- Thou Shalt Not Kill (1913)*short
- The Deerslayer (1913)*short
- Time Lock No. 776 (1915)*feature
- Prohibition (1915)*feature
- Thou Shalt Not Kill (1915)*feature; based on the Leo Frank case
