= Jessie Bartlett Davis =

American actress (1859–1905)

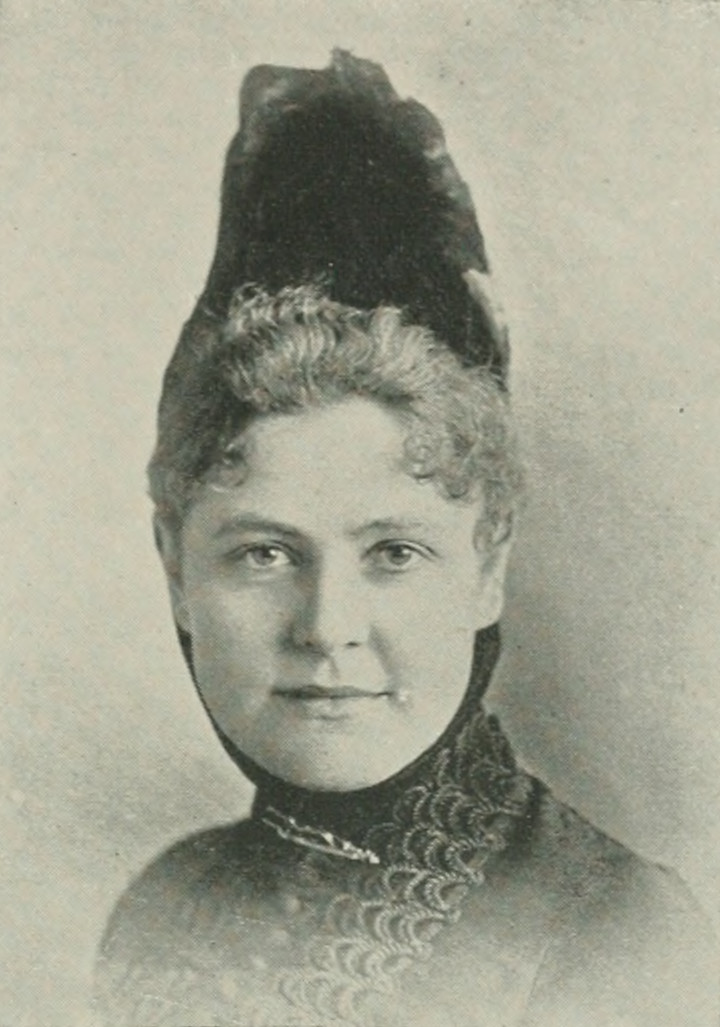
Jessie Bartlett Davis

Jessie Bartlett Davis, born Jessie Fremont Bartlett, (September 17, 1859 – May 14, 1905) was an American operatic singer and actress from Morris, Illinois. A contralto associated with The Bostonians, she is best known for creating roles in the three classic American light operas: Idalia in Victor Herbert's Prince Ananias, Dolores in The Serenade, and Alan a-Dale in Reginald De Koven's Robin Hood. In the latter opera she performed the song "Oh Promise Me" which became a staple at weddings. The tune, which was originally performed by tenor Tom Karl in the part of Robin Hood, had failed to connect with audiences until it was reassigned and transposed into a lower key for Davis. Her version became a popular hit to the point that she became closely associated with just this one song for the rest of her career.

== Early life and education ==
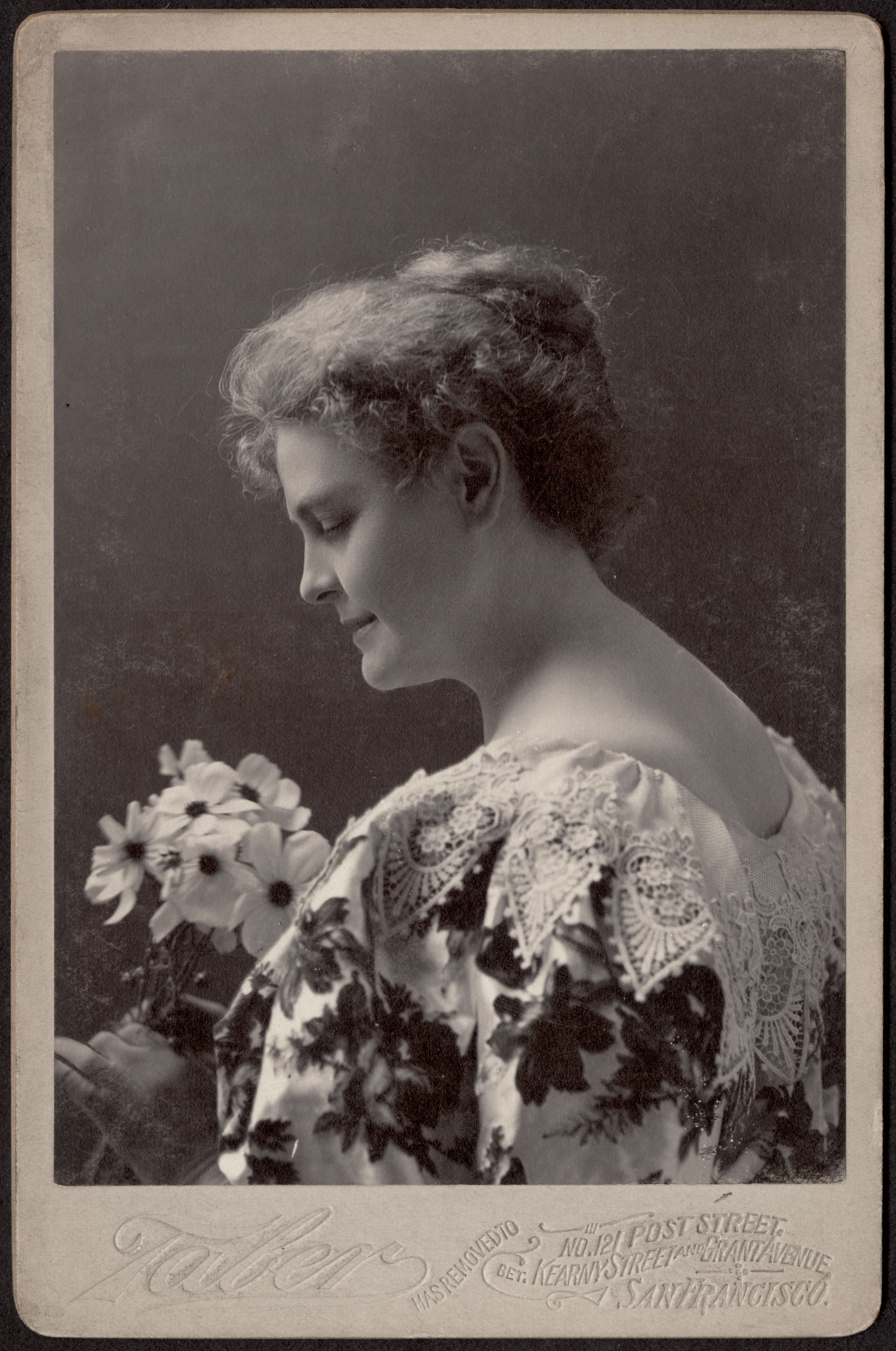
Jessie Bartlett Davis, ca. 1896; from the Philip Hale Photograph Collection of the Boston Public Library

Jessie Fremont Bartlett was born on September 17, 1859 in Morris, Illinois. She was one of nine children born to Elias Lyman Bartlett and his wife Rachael Ann (née Conklin) Bartlett. Her parents were originally from Keene, New Hampshire where her father had worked as a school teacher. He took up farming when the family moved to Illinois.

Jessie and her older sister Belle initially studied singing under her father who was a talented amateur bass. At the age of nine she started performing in concerts with Belle. In January 1874 Belle portrayed the title role in George William Stratton's operetta Laila at the Ottawa Opera House with Jessie playing the part of Laila's companion. That same year Jessie and Belle joined their father as a vocal trio for concerts in which they were billed as "The Bartlett Family of Opera Singers". After becoming known locally, they were approached by traveling managers and began touring along the West Coast of the United States. Belle died not long after this tour ended.

When Jessie was 14 years old, her father sold the family farm and the Bartletts moved to Chicago so that Jessie could further her musical education. There she was a voice student of Frederick W. Root. She later studied singing in Chicago with Sarah Robinson-Duff. Another sister, Josephine Bartlett Perry (1859–1910), also trained as a singer in Chicago and performed with the Chicago Ideal Opera Company and with The Bostonians.

== Performance career ==
=== Richings-Bernard Company ===
While living in Chicago, Jessie was engaged by the performance troupe of Caroline Richings, the Richings-Bernard Company, with whom she toured for one season. The beginning of the 1875-1876 tour consisted of sacred music concerts featuring music by composers like Handel, Mozart, and Rossini, and separate secular concerts which had a mix of popular songs and works from light operas. All told, there were a total of six different concerts programmed by the touring group which they performed dressed in period costumes. Jessie was featured singing the angel's arias from Felix Mendelssohn's Elijah, and Stephen Foster's ballad "Sweet Genevieve" among other repertoire.

In March 1876 Bartlett portrayed Brigitta in Michael William Balfe's comic opera Letty, the Basket Maker at Chicago's Col. Wood's Museum with Riching's company. She continued to tour in this opera with the Richings company in 1876 for performances in Ohio Indiana, and Tennessee. When the Richings company reached St. Louis in April 1876, they presented Mozart's opera The Marriage of Figaro at the Olympic Theatre with Jessie in the role of Cherubino and Richings as Susanna. They toured this opera to Pennsylvania, West Virginia, and Illinois in 1876. The tour ended in Philadelphia in the summer of 1876 and Jessie returned to Chicago.

=== H.M.S. Pinafore and work with Mapelson and William T. Carleton ===
Upon her return to Chicago, Jessie obtained work as a church singer at the Church of the Messiah. In 1879 her manager, J. H. Haverly, convinced her to join the Chicago Church Choir Company for its production Gilbert and Sullivan's operetta H.M.S. Pinafore at the time of the "Pinafore craze". This production was organized and managed by theatre impresario William J. Davis whom Bartlett later married in 1880. Some sources have credited her portrayal of Buttercup in this production as her opera debut.

Following the close of H.M.S. Pinafore, she pursued further vocal training in New York City on the advice of her husband. Her voice teachers in New York included with Luciano Albites and Frank de Rialp. Through Albites she met the opera impresario James Henry Mapleson who was at that time managing an opera company led by Adelina Patti as Marguerite in a production of Charles Gounod's Faust. The actress portraying Siebel became ill, and Mapleson asked Jessie to replace her. Albites quickly taught her the role, and she made her grand opera debut on November 13, 1882, with the Mapelson Opera Company at the Academy of Music in this part. This was followed by performances as the Goatherd in Dinorah the following month.

Following her work with Mapelson, Jessie continued her studies in New York and worked for the McCaull Comic Opera Company at the Casino Theatre. She returned to Chicago in the summer of 1883 to resume performing with the Chicago Church Choir Company (now renamed the Chicago Ideal Opera Company). Her repertoire with the company that summer included the Queen of the Fairies in Iolanthe, and Lady Sangazure in The Sorcerer. Among the cast members in these shows was tenor Charles Herbert Clarke. After giving birth to her son in October 1883, she made her grand opera debut in Chicago in February 1884, again as Siebel, at McVicker's Theater with Etelka Gerster as Marguerite.

Jessie went to Paris where she studied singing with Anna de La Grange. Upon returning to New York City she became a member of the theatre troupe of William T. Carleton with whom she toured for one season. This tour commenced in June 1884. Her repertoire on the tour included the roles of Elsa Groot in Johann Strauss II's Der lustige Krieg, the drummer Griolet in La fille du tambour-major, and Lady Pamela (renamed Lady Allcash) in Daniel Auber's Fra Diavolo. When the company's tour reached New York City in February 1885, they put on Audran's La mascotte at the Fourteenth Street Theatre with Jessie in the trouser role of Prince Frederick. She left the tour and returned home to Chicago in March 1885 when news of her son's serious illness reached her.

She then became a member of the American Opera Company which was led by conductor Theodore Thomas. Her repertoire with this company included Azucena in Il trovatore, Mallika in Lakmé, Ortrud in Lohengrin, the Queen of the Gypsies in The Bohemian Girl, Urbain in Les Huguenots, and the title role in Carmen. In 1886 she returned to Manhattan's Academy of Music as Mrs. Page in The Merry Wives of Windsor.

=== The Bostonians, later life, and death ===
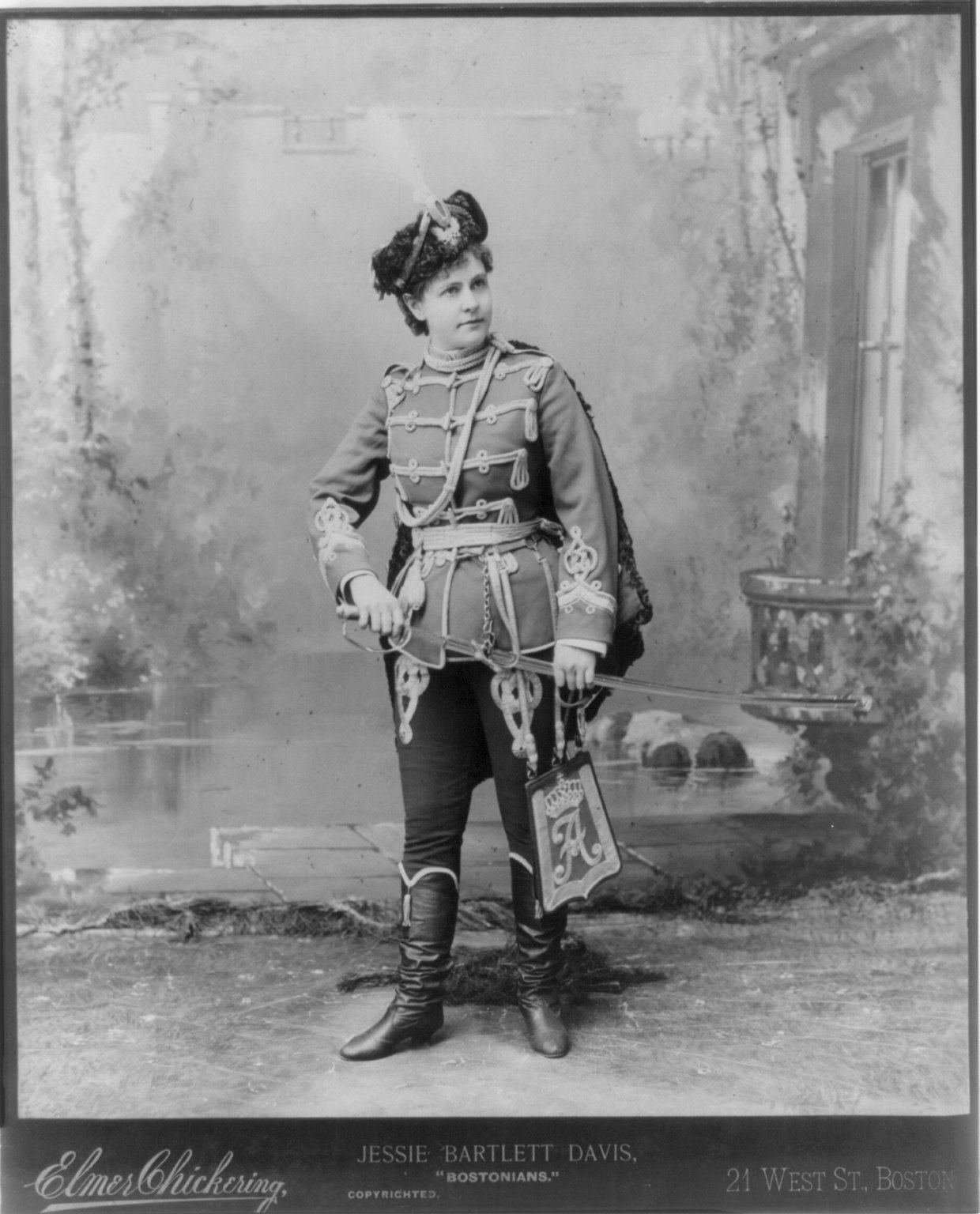
Davis in Bostonians (1889)

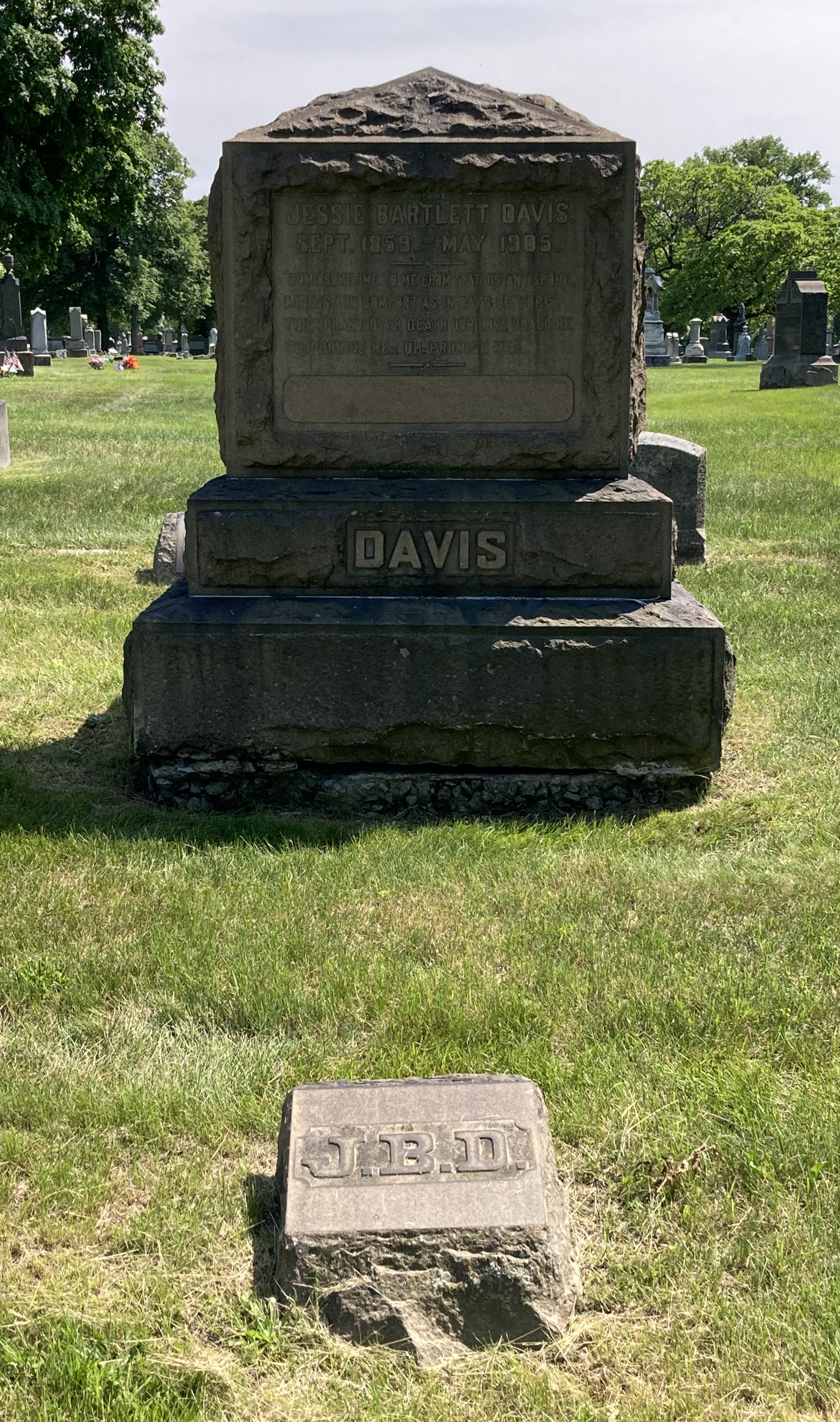
Davis's grave at Oak Woods Cemetery

In 1888 Jessie became the leading contralto of The Bostonians (earlier named the Boston Ideal Opera Company). She performed with this troupe until 1901, serving as its prima donna. With this company she created roles in two classic American light operas composed by Victor Herbert: Idalia in Prince Ananias (1894) and Dolores in The Serenade (1897); both of which were staged on Broadway. Her most famous role was as Alan a-Dale in the 1890 opera Robin Hood by Reginald De Koven and Clement Scott. She performed the song "Oh Promise Me" in this production which became very popular. She also created the role of Dorothea in De Koven's Don Quixote in 1889.

With The Bostonians Jessie performed in both grand opera and light opera repertoire. Some of the roles she portrayed with the company included Azucena, Carmen, Cynisca in Pygmalion and Galatea, the Marchioness in Oscar Weil's Suzette, Nancy in Martha, and Wladimir Dimitrowitsch Samoiloff in Fatinitza. She made three recordings with the Berliner Gramophone company during her time with The Bostonians. These included "Oh, Promise Me" (1895), the ballad "O Genevieve" (1898), and "Don Jose of Sevilla" (1898); the latter a duet from The Serenade sung with The Bostonians baritone W. H. MacDonald. These recordings are catalogued in the Discography of American Historical Recordings.

In 1901, at the time she left The Bostonians, Davis began performing in vaudeville, where she reportedly earned $1,000 per week. She remained primarily active as a vaudeville singer up until just a few days before her death in 1905 when illness forced her to cancel her vaudeville engagements. In 1902 she performed in a Shakespeare production at Denver, Colorado's, Elitch Theatre. The local newspaper reported: "A characteristically clever stroke of business, and a brilliant achievement on the part of Mary Elitch Long, is the securing of Jessie Bartlett Davis for the production of A Midsummer Night's Dream. The combination is superlatively attractive. Jessie Bartlett Davis has no peer among American singers." From October 19 to November 28, 1903, she appeared again on Broadway in a revival of Edward Jakobowski's operetta Erminie.

In 1903 the Iroquois Theatre where Jessie's husband was currently working as manager was destroyed in a disastrous fire leading to the loss of nearly 600 lives. Jessie had a minor interest in this theater. Having never retired, she died at her home on Grand Avenue in Chicago on May 14, 1905, after becoming seriously ill just two days earlier. The cause of death was heart failure resulting from uremia connected to nephritis. She was buried in Oak Woods Cemetery in Chicago. She had one son who survived infancy, William J. Davis Jr., who as an adult worked with his father in Chicago theater management. The Davis family had a home in Crown Point, Indiana called Willowdale Farm where that would spend their summers starting sometime before 1895. Her husband later lived there in retirement from 1914 until his death in 1919.

At the World's Columbian Exposition of 1893, the Fine Arts Building included in its list of exhibits "Bust of Mrs. Jessie Bartlett Davis (Marble) (Lent by Mr. Davis, Chicago)", by Aloys Loeher.

== Songwriter/writer ==
Jessie Bartlett Davis was a published writer of poems and the author of short stories such as "Only a Chorus Girl". She wrote the parlor song "It's Just Because I Love You So" which was published in 1900 by Sol Bloom in the song collection It's Just Because I Love You So named for her tune. Jessie only wrote this one song in the collection whose other music was supplied by other songwriters. Some of the other songs in the collection included "There's Nobody Just Like You" by Edward Gardenier and William Penn; "Baby Mine " by Leo Friedman and Raymond A Browne; and "Two Congregations " by Leo Friedman and Jeff T. Branen.

In 1901 she helped Carrie Jacobs-Bond launch her songwriting career by volunteering to pay for the cost to publish Seven Songs: as Unpretentious as the Wild Rose, which included the classic wedding song "I Love You Truly" which became a bestseller.
