= William H. MacDonald =

American actor and singer

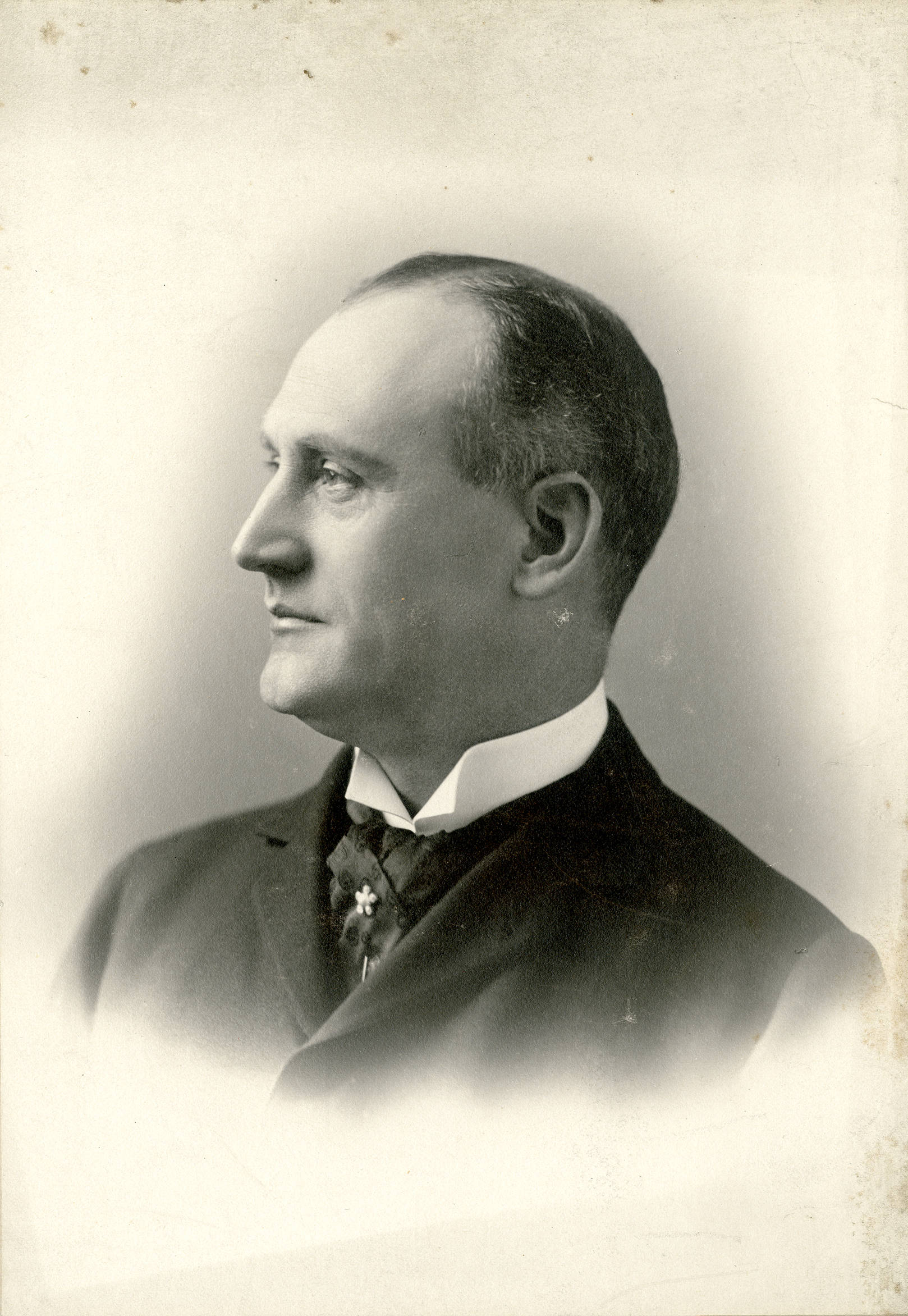
William H. MacDonald

William Henry MacDonald (November 1, 1849 – March 27, 1906) was an American baritone and actor who performed in operas, operettas, and musicals during the late 19th century and early 20th century. He was a longtime member of the Boston Ideal Opera Company (later known as The Bostonians). With that company he created roles in the premieres of several classic American operettas, including Little John in Reginald De Koven's Robin Hood (1890), Louis Biron in Victor Herbert's Prince Ananias (1894), and Carlos Alvarado in Herbert's The Serenade (1897).

== Early life in America, education, and early career in Europe ==
William H. MacDonald was born in Steubenville, Ohio on November 1, 1849. He was trained as an operatic baritone in England, Germany, and Italy, and in the latter country made his stage debut in Giuseppe Verdi's Il trovatore. While studying in Italy he met his future wife, the soprano Marie Stone (1847-1899). In Europe he had success on the opera stage in leading parts in The Barber of Seville, Ruy Blas and La forza del destino.

== Early career in the United States ==
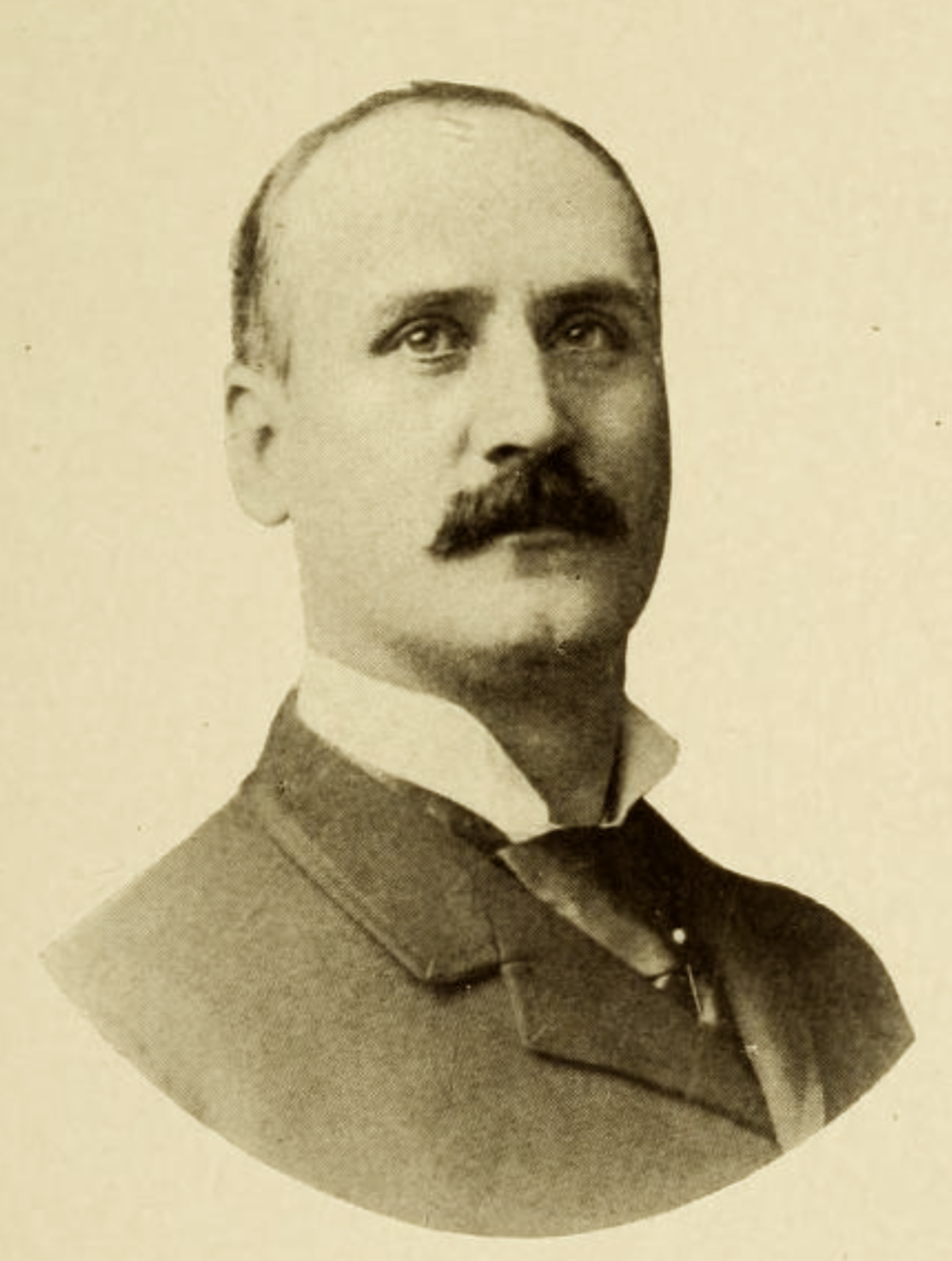
William H. MacDonald

After returning to the United States, MacDonald made his American concert debut in Pittsburgh in January 1876 performing in the concert company of Thérèse Tietjens. In August 1876 he was appointed a resident artist at the Boston Lyceum Opera Company. He made his debut with this company in December 1876 at the Boston Academy of Music in Martha. His other repertoire with this company included Don José de Santarém in Maritana (1876), and Don Pedro in The Rose of Castille (1877).

In 1878 MacDonald became a member of the English Opera Company which performed mainly foreign language operas in English language translations. This company was managed by William T. Carleton, and his repertoire with the company included Ferrando in Il trovatore, Count Arnheim in The Bohemian Girl, and Giacomo in Fra Diavolo. He also worked as a singer at St. Peter's Episcopal Church in Cambridge, Massachusetts in the 1870s.

By January 1879 MacDonald and his wife were both members of Adelaide Phillipps's opera troupe. He made his Broadway debut on March 17, 1879 at Booth's Theatre in the United States premiere of Charles Lecocq's Le petit duc. In June 1879 he portrayed General Kantschukoff in Franz von Suppé's Fatinitza at McVicker's Theatre in Chicago. In August 1879 he sang for the unveiling of the Custer Monument at West Point; performing in a quartet the song "Hail! and Farewell to Custer" which was created for the occasion by the American novelist Henry Morford.

MacDonald and his wife joined Emma Abbott's traveling opera company for the 1879-1880 season which began its tour at the Grand Opera House in Manhattan. His repertoire with her company included Mephistopheles in Faust, St. Croix in Victor Massé's Paul and Virginie, Capulet in Roméo et Juliette, and Count Arnheim in The Bohemian Girl.

== Boston Ideal Opera Company / The Bostonians / Broadway ==
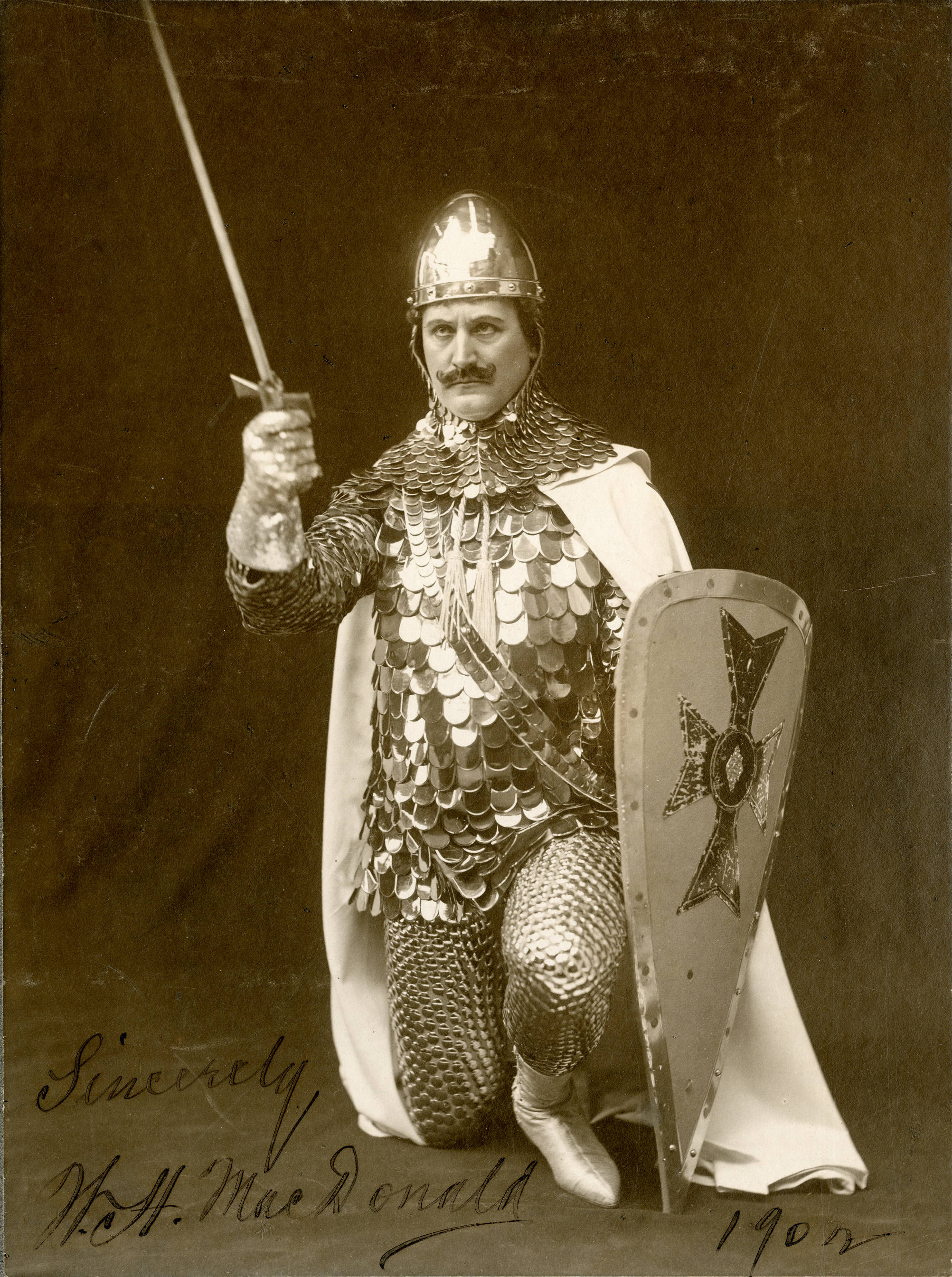
1902 photograph of baritone William H. MacDonald.

In November 1880 MacDonald joined the roster of the Boston Ideal Opera Company (BIOC) at the time that his wife, Marie Stone, was appointed the company's prima donna. He made his company debut with the BIOC as Sir Marmaduke in Gilbert and Sullivan's The Sorcerer with his wife as Aline. When the Boston Ideals dissolved and was restructured as The Bostonians in 1887 he was credited as one of the founding forces behind that reorganization.

With The Bostonians MacDonald created roles in the premieres of several classic American operettas, including Little John in Reginald De Koven's Robin Hood (1890), Louis Biron in Victor Herbert's Prince Ananias (1894), and Carlos Alvarado in Herbert's The Serenade (1897); all of which were staged on Broadway. MacDonald also returned to Broadway as Little John in the 1900 revival of Robin Hood and that operetta's sequel, Maid Marian, in 1902. His other Broadway credits include the musicals The Viceroy (1900, as Corleone) and A China Doll (1904, as Wing Lee).

MacDonald was performing with "The Free Lance" company in Springfield, Massachusetts in March 1906 when he became ill with a cold. It developed into pneumonia and he died in Springfield on March 27, 1906.
