= Prince Ananias =

Operetta composed by Victor Herbert

Photo from the original production

Prince Ananias was the first operetta composed by Victor Herbert. The libretto is by Francis Neilson. It was first produced by a troupe called "The Bostonians" at The Broadway Theatre on November 20, 1894, directed by Jerome Sykes. It remained in their repertoire for three seasons and was given more than 300 performances in all. A modest success at first, it did well on tour.

== Synopsis ==
Arriving at the court of King Boniface, a touring troupe of players finds that the king has lost his ability to laugh. They are tasked with finding his sense of humor; the penalty for failure is death. They produce a work, Prince Ananias, that is not well-received, except that the title character is so inept that the king bursts out laughing. Thus, the players have a happy ending, as do the several pairs of lovers who overcome various romantic and backstage complications.

== Roles and original cast ==
- Boniface, King of Navarre – George Frothingham
- Cerdic, Duc d'Angers – William Castleman
- Killjoy, Chamberlain to the King – Peter Lang
- Louis Biron, a vagabond poet and adventurer – W. H. MacDonald
- George Le Grabbe, an outlaw – Eugene Cowles
- La Fontaine, manager of a band of strolling players – H. C. Barnabee
- Eugene, an obscured [sic] dramatist – Joseph Sheehan
- Jacques, an innkeeper – James E. Miller
- Ivon, a villager – J. R. Boyle
- Felicie, Countess of Pyrennes, sister to Killjoy – Josephine Barlett
- Mirabel, daughter to Killjoy – Mena Cleary
- Ninette, a village belle – Eloise Morgan
- Idalia, La Fontaine's leading lady – Jessie Bartlett Davis

== Musical numbers ==
Act I

- No. 1 - Chorus - "The glorious robe of Autumn spread o'er hillside and a thousand dales; with tints of gold and flaming red..."
- No. 2 - George - "Under an oak one fine June morn, unostentatiously was born a babe, ordained for fickle fate to play with far from lightly..."
- No. 3 - Louis - "Ninette has taken heart..." & "For all you people know, I might be the heir apparent on a diplomatic mission..."
- No. 4 - Ninette and Louis - "It needs no poet, gentle maid, to eulogise your charms ... The compliments, my lord, you've paid fill me with strange alarms..."
- No. 5a - Chorus of Players - "La Fontaine! La Fontaine! La Fontaine!" etc... "Hey! the jolly fellow, oh, his fun is mellow; here he comes with sunny smile..."
- No. 5b - La Fontaine and Chorus - "An author manager am I of a company artistic. Some say the apple of my eye is the ultra realistic..."
- No. 6 - Ninette and La Fontaine - "When a maid applies for a part in a company such as mine, and has no particular line, I always consider my Art..."
- No. 7 - Idalia - "Far o'er the mountains that cleave the blue skies lies the fair hamlet of Fancy. There dwell the maidens with flashing black eyes..."
- No. 8 - Louis, George and Chorus - "When I was born I weighed ten stone ... 'Tis true, I held the scale ... So large was I in head and bone..."
- No. 9 - Idalia and Louis - "I am no queen, no sway hold I, no palace waits for me. The verdant fields, the sun, the sky, and love, if love needs be..."
- No. 10 - Finale Act I - "Farewell! provincial towns, farewell! No more you'll see this company, the weary one-night stand farewell! ..."

Act II

- No. 11a - Introduction
- No. 12 - Eugene - "Come, Venus and Hebe, adorn my bark and float with me. Euterpe, thy lute bring, and bid the sirens to me sing..."
- No. 13 - Eugene, La Fontaine and Chorus - "I thought it very easy to sit down and write a play. The sitting down was simple that I practis'd ev'ry day..."
- No. 14 - Ninette, Idalia, Eugene, Louis, George and Chorus - "Ah! list to me, I sing of love, I sing of love, my love for thee which I shall prove..."
- No. 15 - George - "A bandit bold lived like a king, 'way in a forest deep; of pining love none dared to sing, from care his heart to keep..."
- No. 16 - Lord Chamberlain, La Fontaine, Louis and George - "Now Herodotus omits in his history to state that varieties were quite the thing in Athens..."
- No. 17 - Ninette and Court Ladies - "Titled widows all are we, each a brand new divorcée; nothing for us but the stage..."
- No. 18 - Eugene, Lord Chamberlain, La Fontaine, Louis and George - "A strange remark ... the day is dark ... when skies are blue and clear..."
- No. 19a - Entrance of the King - "All hail our smileless King! Dejected monarch sad, to whom all woes doth cling, a laugh he never had..."
- No. 19b - King and Chorus - "A regal sadness sits on me ... Sits on him! Sits on him! ... Also a sombre gloom..."
- No. 20 - Idalia - "A ray of golden sunlight fell across my life when you passed by. I felt my heart with rapture swell..."
- No. 21 - Louis and Chorus - "My royal dad had reached the age of forty years and five ... when his physician did engage to keep his King alive..."
- No. 22 - Finale Act II - "One equalled him... He's dead and gone... What, two? Absurd! ... Oh no, just one... Rely on him implicitly, he detests prevarication..."
