= The Serenade =

Operetta by Victor Herbert and Harry B. Smith

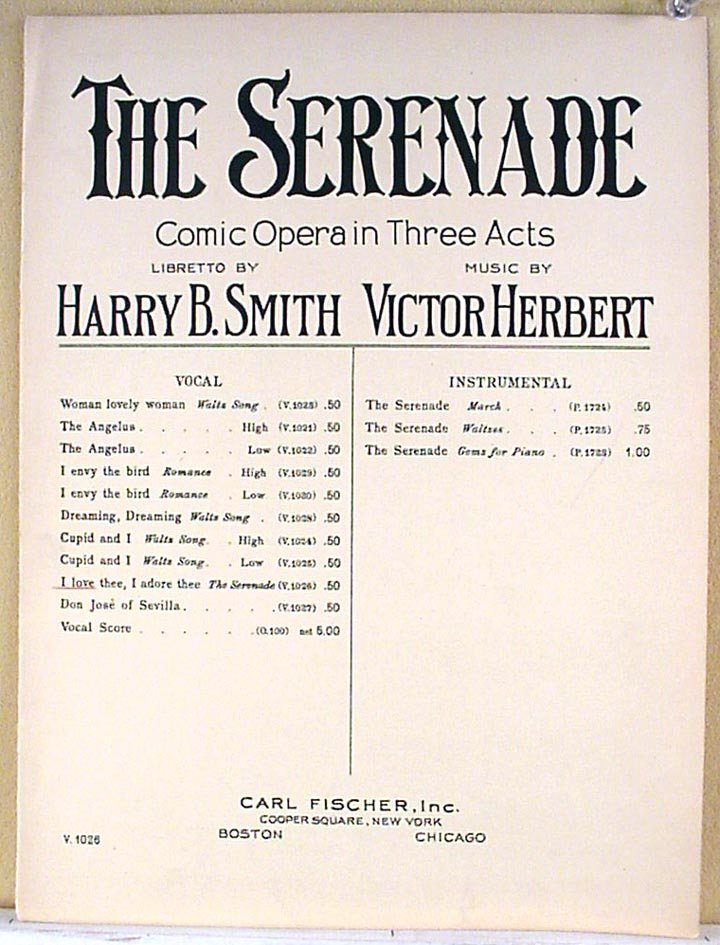
- Sheet music
- Music: Victor Herbert
- Lyrics: Victor Herbert
- Book: Harry B. Smith
- Productions: 1897 Broadway; 1930 Broadway revival

The Serenade is an operetta with music and lyrics by Victor Herbert, and book by Harry B. Smith. Produced by a troupe called "The Bostonians", it premiered on Broadway on March 16, 1897, at the Knickerbocker Theatre and ran initially for 79 performances. It remained very popular into the new century, running almost continuously for the next seven years.

Herbert's second Broadway success (after The Wizard of the Nile), The Serenade is a romantic comedy about a song that sweeps the Spanish countryside. It has a complicated plot involving a girl, her near-sighted guardian who is trying to woo her, and a suitor who steals the girl away from the guardian. The Serenade helped spark the career of Alice Nielsen, a young soprano from Nashville. She went on to form her own theatre company and continued to star in other Herbert operettas.

It was revived on March 4, 1930, at Jolson's 59th Street Theatre, where it ran for 15 performances.

== Characters and original cast ==
- The Duke of Santa Cruz – Henry Clay Barnabee
- Mother Superior – Josephine Bartlett
- Colombo (tenor) – Harry Brown
- Mercedes – Louise Cleary
- Romero – Eugene Cowles
- Fra Anselmo – Harry Dale
- Dolores (contralto) – Jessie Bartlett Davis
- Gomez – George B. Frothingham
- Isabella – Leonora Guito
- El Gato – Charles Hawley
- Manuelo – Bertha Lovejoy
- Carlos Alvarado (baritone) – William H. MacDonald
- The Abbot – James E. Miller
- Yvonne (soprano) – Alice Nielsen alternating with Hilda Clark
- Lopez (tenor) – William E. Philp
- Juana – Marcia Van Dresser
- Fra Timoteo – Adam Warmouth

== Synopsis ==
Act I – The main office of the Royal Madrid Brigandage Association, Ltd., near a haunted castle in the mountains

Romero (the President of the Royal Madrid Brigandage Association) and his group of bandits lie in wait to ambush travelers, including Alvarado and Dolores, the ward of the Duke of Santa Cruz. The Duke, who plans to wed his ward, has come to his castle to avoid the leading baritone of the Madrid Opera who has wooed and won the heart of his Dolores by singing her a serenade. The Duke is unaware that Alvarado is the singer. Yvonne, Colombo (her father, a former primo tenor) and Gomez (a tailor) appear, each looking for Alvarado for different reasons. Gomez asks Colombo to teach him the serenade so that he can win Dolores. But the singing attracts the Duke, who sends Colombo to the castle tower upon hearing his boasts of causing women to fall in love by his singing. Alvarado hears the Duke's plan to hide Dolores from the baritone in a convent and decides to hide himself in the monastery next door to be close to her. Yvonne overhears his plan and determines to spoil it. The bandits storm the castle, Alvarado arrives, and a battle ensues. Colombo, from his tower, dons a Mephistopheles costume and scares the bandits away by making them believe the castle is haunted.

Act II – The garden of the Monastery of St. Benedict, adjoining the Convent School of St. Ursula

In the gardens of the monastery and convent, Yvonne, dressed as a boy, seeks employment so she may spy on Alvarado. Alvarado and Dolores arrive with the Duke, who asks the mother superior to accept Dolores for a few days of instruction. The Duke leaves with Alvarado, who secretly plans to tip their carriage into a ditch and return for Dolores. Yvonne, still searching for Alvarado, is overheard by Dolores, and develops a plan to get out of her employment by swapping clothes and places with Dolores. Gomez arrives seeking help, having enraged a traveler in an overturned carriage (the Duke) by singing the serenade. Romero, disguised as "Brother Januario", agrees to hide Gomez by dressing him as a nun. As thanks, Gomez gives Romero the music to the serenade, and Romero teaches it to the monks. Yvonne, dressed as Dolores, is discovered flirting with Alvarado and is sent to the convent for admonishment by the mother superior. Alvarado mistakes Dolores for the gardener's boy, but she explains the situation and the two plan their escape. The Duke is enraged upon hearing the monks practicing the serenade. Romero confesses to being Alvarado so he will not be recognized as a bandit. Yvonne continues to pretend to be Dolores so that she can leave with the Duke. Alvarado takes advantage of the mistaken identities to steal away with Dolores.

Act III – The same as Act I

Alvarado and Dolores, captured by the bandits and unable to afford the ransom, offer themselves as recruits. Yvonne (still dressed as Dolores) and Gomez arrive with the Duke, who goes to check on "Alvarado" (Columbo) in the tower. Gomez sings the serenade to woo "Dolores", attracting the attention of the Duke who, after discovering his mistake, vows that he has had enough of such adventures and returns to deal with "Alvarado". Yvonne reveals that she is not Dolores and enlists the aid of Gomez to save her father from the Duke. But the Duke returns and discovers the deception. The bandits capture the Duke and demand his life. Dolores offers to spare him if he agrees, as magistrate, to marry her to Alvarado. Yvonne realizes the hopelessness of gaining Alvarado and pairs off with Lopez, Romero's secretary. The Duke acquiesces on the condition that he will never hear them sing the serenade again. All agree — except for one last time.

== Songs ==
Act I

- No. 1a. Chorus - "In attitudes alert! Hist! Hush! With keen and piercing eyes"
- No. 1b. Romero and chorus - "Let spiritless townsmen bend the neck to the yoke of the country's law"
- No. 2. Alvarado and chorus - "Peering left and peering right with very anxious scrutiny"
- No. 3. Chorus - "Hola-ho! ..." and "Although a Duke of high degree whose ancestors are numerous"
- No. 4. Alvarado and Dolores - "When the theatre was brightest with the golden glare"
- No. 5. Yvonne, Colombo and Gomez - "The old Italian Method grand is what we practice"
- No. 6. Lopez and Yvonne - "Gaze on this face, so noble, so serene; look in these eyes how radiant are they"
- No. 7. Finale - "'Tis time our work to do. Hist! Hush! Hist! Hush! Our presence they shall rue"

Act II

- No. 8. Chorus of monks and novices - "In our quiet cloister, monkish brethren dwell, peaceful as an oyster"
- No. 9. Yvonne and monks - "Where are the stars so brightly twinkling as in fair Andalusia?"
- No. 10. Romero and male chorus - "When I went my rounds one day, seeking charity, charity, charity"
- No. 11a. Ensemble - "Who can this be? We'll stay and see, with worldly curiositee!"
- No. 11b. Duke and chorus - "Who was it in Eden encountered the snake? Woman, attractive woman"
- No. 12. Dolores and chorus - "The Angelus sounds from the convent bells like a dear voice low and tender"
- No. 13. Yvonne - "Cupid once found me a-dreaming, lulled by the soft summer breeze"
- No. 14. Monks' chant - "I love thee, I adore thee, O my heart, life, and soul, all are thine"
- No. 15. Alvarado, Dolores, Yvonne and Romero - "I'm sure 'tis she! Just wait! I'll see"
- No. 16. Finale - "Dishonor most appalling, and terrible disgrace are threatening the falling of this monastic place"

Act III

- Entr'acte
- No. 17. Chorus - "Here merrily bide the bandit tribe when the day's honest work is done"
- No. 18. Dolores, Alvarado and chorus - "Don José of Sevilla was a gay roué, acting parts, breaking hearts"
- No. 19. Lopez - "I envy the bird within its cage, whose song to her is not denied"
- No. 20. Duke, Yvonne and Gomez - "One afternoon while dozing, my eyes a moment closing"
- No. 21. Finale - "Take your choice, my Dolores, marry whom you will!"
