= SS Victor Herbert =

Liberty ship of WWII

History

United States
- Name: Victor Herbert
- Namesake: Victor Herbert
- Owner: War Shipping Administration (WSA)
- Operator: Marine Transport Lines, Inc.
- Ordered: as type (EC2-S-C1) hull, MC hull 1532
- Builder: J.A. Jones Construction, Panama City, Florida
- Cost: $1,846,347
- Yard number: 14
- Way number: 2
- Laid down: 30 June 1943
- Launched: 22 August 1943
- Completed: 15 September 1943
- Identification: Call Signal: KXLI
- Fate: Sold to France, 6 December 1946, scrapped 1963

General characteristics
- Class & type: Liberty ship; type EC2-S-C1, standard
- Tonnage: 10,865 LT DWT; 7,176 GRT
- Displacement: 3,380 long tons (3,434 t) (light); 14,245 long tons (14,474 t) (max)
- Length: 441 feet 6 inches (135 m) oa; 416 feet (127 m) pp; 427 feet (130 m) lwl
- Beam: 57 feet (17 m)
- Draft: 27 ft 9.25 in (8.4646 m)
- Installed power: 2 × Oil fired 450 °F (232 °C) boilers, operating at 220 psi (1,500 kPa); 2,500 hp (1,900 kW)
- Propulsion: 1 × triple-expansion steam engine, (manufactured by General Machinery Corp., Hamilton, Ohio); 1 × screw propeller
- Speed: 11.5 knots (21.3 km/h; 13.2 mph)
- Capacity: 562,608 cubic feet (15,931 m^{3}) (grain); 499,573 cubic feet (14,146 m^{3}) (bale)
- Complement: 38–62 USMM; 21–40 USNAG
- Armament: Varied by ship; Bow-mounted 3-inch (76 mm)/50-caliber gun; Stern-mounted 4-inch (102 mm)/50-caliber gun; 2–8 × single 20-millimeter (0.79 in) Oerlikon anti-aircraft (AA) cannons and/or, 2–8 × 37-millimeter (1.46 in) M1 AA guns

SS Victor Herbert was a Liberty ship built in the United States during World War II. She was named after Victor Herbert, a composer, conductor, and founder of the American Society of Composers, Authors and Publishers (ASCAP).

== Construction ==
Victor Herbert was laid down on 30 June 1943, under a United States Maritime Commission (MARCOM) contract, MC hull 1532, by J.A. Jones Construction, Panama City, Florida; she was launched on 22 August 1943.

== History ==
She was allocated to Marine Transport Lines, Inc., on 15 September 1943. On 6 December 1946, she was sold to France, for $544,506. She was scrapped in 1963.

== Bibliography ==
- "Jones Construction, Panama City FL". ShipbuildingHistory.com. 13 October 2010.
- Davies, James (May 2004). "Specifications (As-Built)" (PDF). p. 23.
- Maritime Administration. "Victor Herbert". Ship History Database Vessel Status Card. U.S. Department of Transportation, Maritime Administration.
- "SS Victor Herbert".
