= Robin Hood (De Koven opera) =

Cover of 1891 libretto of Robin Hood

Robin Hood is a comic opera with music by Reginald De Koven and a libretto by Harry B. Smith. The story is based on the Robin Hood legend, during the reign of King Richard I (1189–1199 AD).

The opera premiered at the Chicago Opera House in June 1890 (produced by the Boston Ideal Opera Company) and opened on Broadway in September 1891. It played at London's Prince of Wales Theatre in 1891 under the title Maid Marian. It was revived on Broadway in 1900, 1902, 1912, 1918, 1929, 1932 and 1944.

== History ==
Robin Hood was composed in Chicago, Illinois, during the winter of 1888–1889. It premiered at the Chicago Opera House on June 9, 1890. It was performed by the Boston Ideal Opera Company, also known as the Bostonians, with the original cast consisting of Edwin Hoff as Robin Hood, Henry Clay Barnabee as the Sheriff of Nottingham, Marie Stone as Lady Marian, Peter Lang as Sir Guy of Gisborne, W. H. MacDonald as Little John, George Frothingham as Friar Tuck, Jessie Bartlett Davis as both Allan-A-Dale and Dame Durden, Eugene Cowles as Will Scarlet, and Carlotta Maconda as Annabel.

The production traveled to New York where it opened on Broadway at the Standard Theatre on September 22, 1891. The Broadway cast was the same as in Chicago, except that Tom Karl played Robin, and Caroline Hamilton was Marian. Davis was unhappy with her role and demanded that De Koven provide her with a new song during the Broadway run. De Koven gave her a song he had written several years earlier, "Oh Promise Me" (with lyrics by Clement Scott), which had already been interpolated into the London production. It became the Broadway show's hit musical number.

Prior to the Broadway opening, the opera was staged in London for the first time at the Prince of Wales Theatre in 1891 under the title Maid Marian, starring Hayden Coffin as Robin.

It was revived at the Knickerbocker Theater on Broadway on April 30, 1900. Other Broadway revivals were in 1902 at the Academy of Music, in 1912 at New Amsterdam Theatre with Walter Hyde in the title role, in 1918 at the Park Theatre, in 1929 at the Casino Theatre and Jolson's 59th Street Theatre, in 1932 at Erlanger's Theatre, and in 1944 at the Adelphi Theatre.

In 2004 Ohio Light Opera produced the opera based on a new critical edition of the opera that it commissioned from Quade Winter, based on the composer's original manuscripts in the Library of Congress. A complete CD recording was issued by Albany Records.

== Synopsis ==
The opera is set in the late 12th century during the reign of King Richard I.

=== Act 1 ===
In the market square in Nottingham, England, villagers are celebrating the first day of May. Friar Tuck tells how he sells clothing and other goods ("As an Honest Auctioneer"). Annabel and the milkmaids are happy with their lives ("Milkmaids' Song"), but Allan-a-Dale notes that milkmaids are overworked. Robin Hood and his archers arrive and tout their ideal life in the woods ("Come the Bowmen in Lincoln Green"); they are welcomed to an archery contest. Robin notices Annabel, and Allan-A-Dale quickly questions his motives, as Allan loves Annabel. Annabel, Allan, Robin and the outlaw Little John consider the fickle nature of love. Maid Marian enters in disguise as a page boy to see Sir Guy of Gisborne, the ward of the Sheriff of Nottingham ("I Came as a Cavalier"). The Sheriff has arranged a marriage between Guy and Marian. Marian reveals herself to Robin and the reasons for her disguise, and the two fall in love ("Come Dream So Bright").

The Sheriff appears and boasts of his plans ("I am the Sheriff of Nottingham"). Sir Guy and the Sheriff plot how Guy will ask Marian to marry him (When a Peer Makes Love to a Damsel Fair). Robin and the bowmen return, pleased about the prizes they won in the archery contest. Because Robin is to receive his inheritance today, they go to the Sheriff's residence, knock on the door, and demand that the Sheriff declare Robin Hood's title of Earl, with its title to his land, and cash. The Sheriff refuses all demands and produces forged documents stating that Sir Guy is the Earl. Little John invites Robin to join the jolly outlaws in Sherwood, and Robin and his friends agree.

=== Act 2 ===
In Sherwood Forest, Robin Hood and his friends have gathered ("O Cheerily Sounds the Hunter's Horn", "Brown October Ale" and "Oh, Promise Me"). Dame Durden sees the Sheriff and believes him to be her long lost husband whom she had believed died in battle. She begs him to return to her, and he hesitatingly plays along, although he does not intend to return. The Sheriff realizes that the outfit he is wearing is stolen, and he would have to therefore put himself in jail if found out. Guy, the Sheriff and the tinkers discuss the tinkers' life (The Tinkers' Song"). Robin, Guy, the Sheriff and Robin's men consider their situations ("Oh, See the Lambkins Play").

Marian dreams of Robin ("Forest Song"). Annabel loves and is devoted to Allan-A-Dale but is frustrated by Allan's jealousy. Robin and Annabel discuss a plan for him to serenade Annabel during the evening to pique Allan's jealousy. The Sheriff makes his affections for Annabel known. Marian offers to take Annabel's place that evening, and Robin sings a serenade, "A Troubadour Sang to His Love". The Sheriff, who was pursuing Robin's followers as outlaws, is captured by them. Dame Durden sees the Sheriff and begs him to come back to her, but he insists he is not her husband. The Sheriff finally admits he is a thief, and Dame Durden notes his plight. But Sir Guy arrives with soldiers and overpowers Robin's men. Robin points out that they are powerless over him, due to the king's edict, but he Sheriff replies that the edict applies to Guy (since he is the Earl of Huntington), not Robin, and states that Guy will be Marion's husband.

=== Act 3 ===
In the courtyard of the Sheriff's castle, Will Scarlet and the blacksmith discuss their lives ("The Armourer's Song"). Annabel woefully considers her imminent wedding to the Sheriff (When a Maiden Weds"), and Allan-a-Dale anticipates Robin's funeral ("The Legend of the Chimes)". Robin and Marian sadly pledge their love for each other ("Love, Now We Nevermore Will Part"). The Sheriff, Friar Tuck, Sir Guy, Annabel and Dame Durden discuss the "pangs" of life ("When Life Seems Made of Pains and Pangs"). In the courtyard of the castle, Robin and his men find King Richard, who has arrived home from the Crusades. Robin receives a pardon from King Richard and the return of his land and title. Marian and Robin are now able to marry, as are Annabel and Allan-A-Dale. Everyone is joyful about their freedom.

Notes: "Oh Promise Me" was not part of the original opera, but was written in 1887 by De Koven to lyrics written by English poet and critic Clement Scott and published as a separate art song in 1889. The piece was used in the original London productions in Act 3, sung by Robin at his wedding to Maid Marian, but in the 1891 Broadway version it was sung in Act 2 by Allan-A-Dale between "Brown October Ale" and the "Tinkers' Song".

== Characters ==
- Robert of Huntington (Robin Hood) (tenor)
- The Sheriff of Nottingham (baritone)
- Sir Guy of Gisborne, a ward of the sheriff (tenor)
- Little John, outlaw (baritone)
- Will Scarlet, outlaw, blacksmith and armorer (bass)
- Friar Tuck, outlaw clergyman (bass)
- Allan-A-Dale, outlaw, in love with Annabel (contralto)
- Lady Marian Fitzwalter (Maid Marian) (soprano)
- Dame Durden, a widow (mezzo-soprano)
- Annabel, Durden's daughter, in love with Allan-A-Dale (soprano)
- Chorus

== Musical numbers ==
Act 1

- Auctioneer's Song – Annabel, Alan-a-Dale, Little John, Will Scarlet, Friar Tuck and Chorus
- Milkmaids' Song – Annabel, Alan and Milkmaids
- Come the Bowmen in Lincoln Green – Annabel, Dame Durden, Alan, Robin, Archers, Milkmaids and Chorus
- I Come as a Cavalier – Maid Marian
- Come Dream So Bright – Marian and Robin
- I Am the Sheriff of Nottingham – Guy of Gisborne, Sheriff of Nottingham and Chorus
- When a peer makes love to a damsel fair – Sheriff, Guy, Marian and Chorus

Act 2

Reinald Werrenrath sings "Brown October Ale" (1920, Victrola)

Louise Homer sings "Oh, Promise Me" (1911, Victrola)

- Oh cheerily soundeth the hunter's horn – Alan, Little John and Will
- (Song of) Brown October Ale – John and Male Chorus
- Oh, Promise Me (lyrics by Clement Scott) – Alan
- The Tinkers' Song – Guy, Sheriff and Tinkers
- Oh, see the lambkins play – Robin Guy, Sheriff, John, Friar Tuck and Will
- Forest Song (Ye Birds in Azure Winging) – Marian

Act 3

- The Armorer's Song – Will
- When a Maiden Weds – Annabel
- The Legend of the Chimes – Alan and Chorus
- Love, Now We Nevermore Will Part – Marian and Robin
- When life seems made of pains and pangs – Annabel, Dame Durden, Guy, Sheriff and Friar Tuck
