= Oh Promise Me =

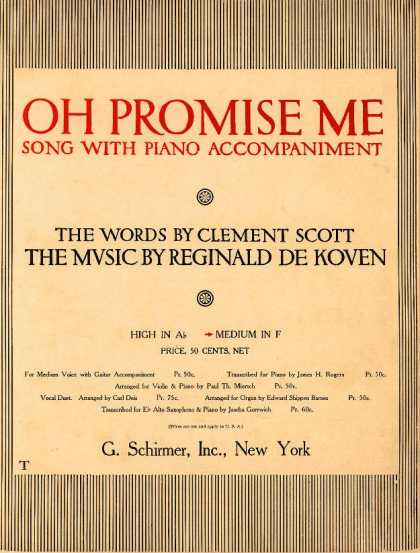
Sheet music cover

Oh Promise Me
Sung by Harry McDonough, circa 1900

"Oh Promise Me" is a song with music by Reginald De Koven and lyrics by Clement Scott. The song was written as an art song in 1887 and first published in 1889 by G. Schirmer, Inc. It is believed that De Koven based the melody of "O Promise Me" partly on "Musica proibita", a popular song by Italian composer Stanislao Gastaldon. In 1890, De Koven wrote his most successful comic opera, Robin Hood, and the song "Oh Promise Me" became a hit song through performances by contralto Jessie Bartlett Davis in the role of Alan-a-Dale.

Stories about "Oh Promise Me"'s inclusion in Robin Hood often repeat the legend that Davis demanded a song to better show off her voice and threatened to walk out of the production if the producers did not comply. However, the San Francisco Chronicle published a piece on the history of the song in 1905 shortly after Davis's death which draws into question the truthfulness of this narrative. According to it, "Oh Promise Me" was originally interpolated into Robin Hood for tenor Tom Karl in the part of Robin Hood, but his performances of the song in the operetta were unsuccessful with audiences and it was cut from the production as a failure. Davis requested that the song be reinserted for her character and it was transposed into a lower key for her voice. It is this modified version that managed to connect to audiences.

The sheet music sold over a million copies in 1890 and continued to gain popularity for several decades, being performed by many artists. The song remains popular as a wedding song both in America and in the UK.

In 1957, American vocal group The Platters recorded a cover of the song, with authorship credited solely to the group's manager Buck Ram, with no mention of the original composers.

== Lyrics ==
Oh, promise me that someday you and I
Will take our love together to some sky
Where we can be alone and faith renew,
And find the hollows where those flowers grew,
Those first sweet violets of early spring,
Which come in whispers, thrill us both, and sing
Of love unspeakable that is to be;
Oh, promise me! Oh, promise me!

Oh, promise me that you will take my hand,
The most unworthy in this lonely land,
And let me sit beside you in your eyes,
Seeing the vision of our paradise,
Hearing God's message while the organ rolls
Its mighty music to our very souls,
No love less perfect than a life with thee;
Oh, promise me! Oh, promise me!

== Use in film and television ==
The song has made many appearances in films and on television shows where weddings or funerals are taking place - Edith Bunker sings it at a wedding for two people from the rest home where she worked in a season eight episode of All in the Family, Eunice sings it at a family wedding in season one of Mama's Family, and it is performed at Diana's wedding in Anne of Green Gables: The Sequel. Julie Andrews performs the song in the black comedy film, S.O.B. (1981) directed by Blake Edwards.
