= Alice Nielsen =

American opera singer (1872–1943)

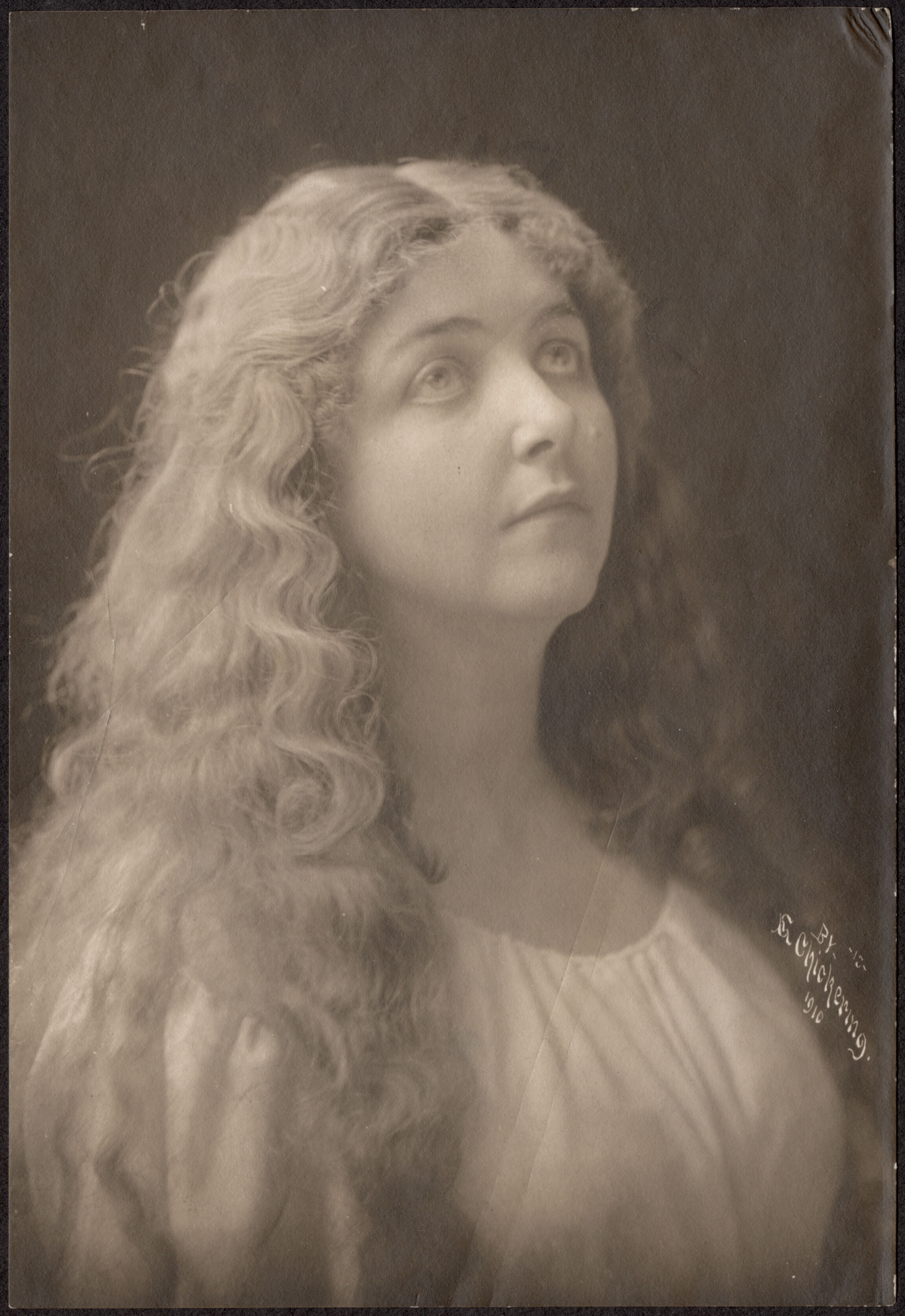
- Alice Nielsen, 1910; from the Philip Hale Photograph Collection of the Boston Public Library
- Born: June 7, 1872; Nashville, Tennessee
- Died: March 8, 1943 (aged 70)
- Resting place: St. Mary Star of the Sea Cemetery, Far Rockaway, Queens
- Occupation: Broadway performer

Alice Nielsen (June 7, 1872 – March 8, 1943) was an American Broadway performer and operatic lyric soprano. She starred in several Victor Herbert operettas and performed with her own Alice Nielsen Opera Company.

== Background ==
Her father, Rasmus, was a Danish troubadour from Aarhus. Her mother, Sara Kilroy, was an Irish musician from County Donegal. Rasmus and Sara met in South Bend, Indiana, United States, where Sara studied music at St. Mary's, now part of Notre Dame. After Rasmus was injured in the Civil War, the couple moved to Nashville, Tennessee, where Alice was born. The Nielsens moved to Warrensburg, Missouri, when Alice was two. Rasmus died a few years later. Sara moved to Kansas City with four surviving children.

== Early career ==
Alice Nielsen roamed downtown Kansas City as a child singing. Outside the Kansas City Club, she was heard by wealthy meat packer Jakob Dold and invited to sing at his daughter's birthday party. Alice was a hit. Dold sent her to represent Missouri at a musicale at the Grover Cleveland White House. On her return, she was cast in a regional tour with Jules Grau's opera company for a season. When it ended, Nielsen joined St. Patrick's Church choir. She married the church organist and had a son. When the marriage turned violent she left for San Francisco on the vaudeville circuit, joined by Arthur Pryor, performing with Burton Stanley and Pyke Opera. In San Francisco she became a soloist at the St. Patrick's, singing at The Wig-Wam and becoming a star in Balfe's Satanella. Joining the Tivoli Opera Company, trained by Ida Valegra, Nielsen played 150 roles in two years. In 1895, Nielsen was hired by The Bostonians, a leading light opera company, which took her to New York City and national fame in 1896. In New York she became a pupil of Frederick Bristol and Sarah Robinson-Duff.

== Broadway ==
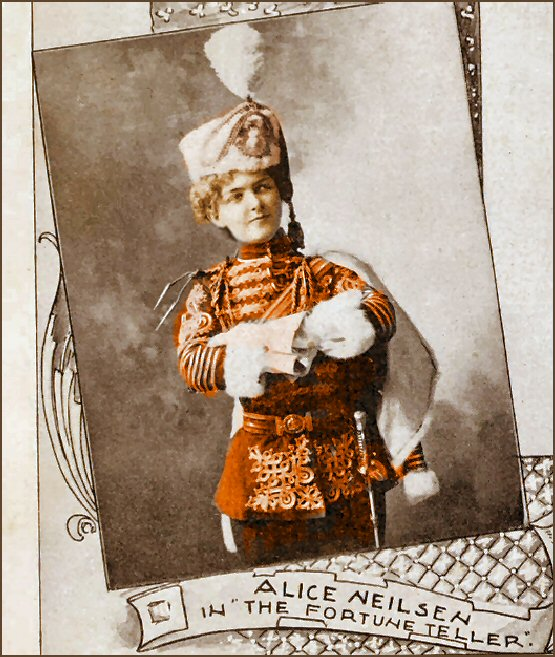
Nielsen in The Fortune Teller

Alice Nielsen in 1900, age 28, was America's biggest box-office draw. "We love our Nielsen, and proud she is an American", said the press. Touring 40,000 miles a year in North America between 1896 and 1901, her shows were Standing Room Only. In New York City, Nielsen became a Broadway star in Victor Herbert's The Serenade. Herbert had written his sixth operetta for prima donna Alice Nielsen and her newly formed Alice Nielsen Opera Company. Nielsen toured North America for three years before reaching London in 1901 in The Fortune Teller. Pushed by business conflicts, Nielsen abandoned her Company and left to study grand opera, coached in the Italian repertoire by Enrico Bevignani, who had coached Swedish operatic soprano, Christina Nilsson.

== Opera ==
In the Spring of 1905, Nielsen returned to London's Covent Garden to perform in several Mozart operas. She joined the roster of the San Carlo Opera Company (SCOC), at that time a touring arm of the Teatro di San Carlo of Naples led by Henry Russell, the following fall for their guest Fall season in residence at Covent Garden with Enrico Caruso and Antonio Scotti. Their La bohème was regarded as a masterpiece of ensemble performance. After the SCOC's Fall season in London ended, the company became its own separate entity under the direction of Russell, severing ties with the opera house in Naples and moving its base of operations to Boston. Nielsen went with the company back to America and was involved in the company's annual North American tours and performances in Boston for several years.

In summer 1906, Nielsen joined Eleonora Duse and Emma Calvé in a joint program of related operas and dramas to open the Shuberts' Waldorf Theatre. One night Duse would act Camille, the next evening Nielsen would sing Traviata. That fall, Nielsen toured America with the SCOC presenting opera concerts featuring a shortened version of Donizetti's Don Pasquale. After a difficult debut in New York City, she became a hit by springtime in Chicago, San Francisco, Los Angeles, and Dallas.

In winter 1907, Nielsen returned to America with Lillian Nordica, Florencio Constantino and a full company for the SCOC's season at New Orleans' French Opera House. During their subsequent North American tour, the group was considered by critics as superior to the touring Met Company, which had preceded Nielsen in Los Angeles, Chicago and Boston. Their Chicago season was sponsored by the Bryn Mawr Alumnae Association.

At the end of the tour, in Boston's Park Theatre during March 1908, the SCOC presented a week of nightly grand opera performances featuring Nielsen and Constantino. The renditions of La bohème and Faust at the Park Theatre created such a sensation that Boston's music patron Eben Jordan offered to build a new opera house for the SCOC's director Henry Russell and his company. The plan was quickly realized, and the newly formed Boston Opera Company under Russell's leadership gave their first performance for the opening of the Boston Opera House on November 8, 1909, with a performance of La Gioconda with Nordica in the title role. Nielsen and Nordica were the company's two leading sopranos during its six years of operation from 1909 to 1915.

She also debuted at the Metropolitan Opera and Opéra de Montréal. Her artist allies for the project included Loie Fuller, Josef Urban and Anna Pavlova. Within six years, however, Boston Opera folded amid the turmoil of World War I. The magnificent building, designed by the team which created Symphony Hall, was located across from New England Conservatory's Jordan Hall and has since been demolished.

== Tour ==
After Boston, Nielsen began a series of popular Chautauqua tours. These outdoor concert took place under a big tent, moving from town-to-town by rail. The circuit ranged from Florida to Chicago. Nielsen was the highest-paid performer on the circuit. The week-long Redpath Chautauqua series closed in each town with "Alice Nielsen Day".

During the 1910s, Nielsen sang in joint concerts with John McCormack and other artists at Carnegie Hall and in national tours. Her concerts consisted of art songs and arias, followed by dozens of encores of popular Celtic and parlor songs. A typical program was,

- "Two Japanese Songs" – Cadman
- "Lullaby" – Cyril Scott
- "Will o' the Wisp" – Charles Gilbert Spross
- "Salvator Rosa" – Carlos Gomez
- "Pouquoi" – Saint-Saëns
- "Mandoline" – Debussy
- "Tu nous souriais" – André Caplet
- "A toi" – Bamberg
- "Down in the Forest" – Landon Ronald
- "But Lately in Dance" – Anton Arensky
- "Oh! Haunting Memory" – Carrie Jacobs-Bond
- "Love Has Wings" – James Hotchkiss Rogers
- "Botschaft" and "Vergebliches Ständchen" – Brahms
- "Solvejgs Lied" and "Ein Traum" – Grieg
- "La Tosca" – Puccini

== Later years ==
Nielsen was a popular recording artist in sessions conducted by Arthur Pryor. She recorded seventy tracks between 1898 and 1928, most of the records issued by Victor and Columbia. Her big hit record was "Home! Sweet Home!", followed by "Un bel dì", "Killarney" and "The Last Rose of Summer". "I only sang the songs I wanted to sing", she stated in Collier's magazine which published her autobiographic 1932 series Born to Sing.

After a brief return to Broadway in 1917's short-lived Belasco musical Kitty Darlin, with lyrics by P. G. Wodehouse, who was fired three weeks before the New York opening, Nielsen married surgeon Le Roy Stoddard and moved to Bedford, New York. By 1920, Nielsen's touring schedule was light. She last appeared with Boston Symphony in 1922. She sang with a reunited Alice Nielsen Company at the Victor Herbert memorial concert staged by ASCAP in 1925. In 1929 she divorced Stoddard. Nielsen continued singing occasional concerts until shortly before her death. In later years, she owned a house in Far Rockaway, Queens, near her brother, who was the parish organist for St. Mary, Star of the Sea Church. Its cemetery is her final resting place.

== Critical response ==
- Eleonora Duse—"Her voice makes one dream and forget the realities of life."
- San Francisco Chronicle—"She is chic and vivacious and filled with indefinable magnetism."
- New York World—"At the present moment she has no rival in her field."
- The Evening World (New York)—"America's greatest lyrical soprano."
- Chicago Post—"Miss Nielsen is thoroughly a great singer, and showed clearly that she has attained the high place she holds in the musical world through sheer merit."
- Musical Courier—"It is difficult to imagine a more perfect Mimi than Miss Nielsen, who sings with a lovely lyric beauty of a voice that has not its counterpart anywhere."
