= Custer Monument (West Point) =

Monument to honor George Armstrong Custer

- United States
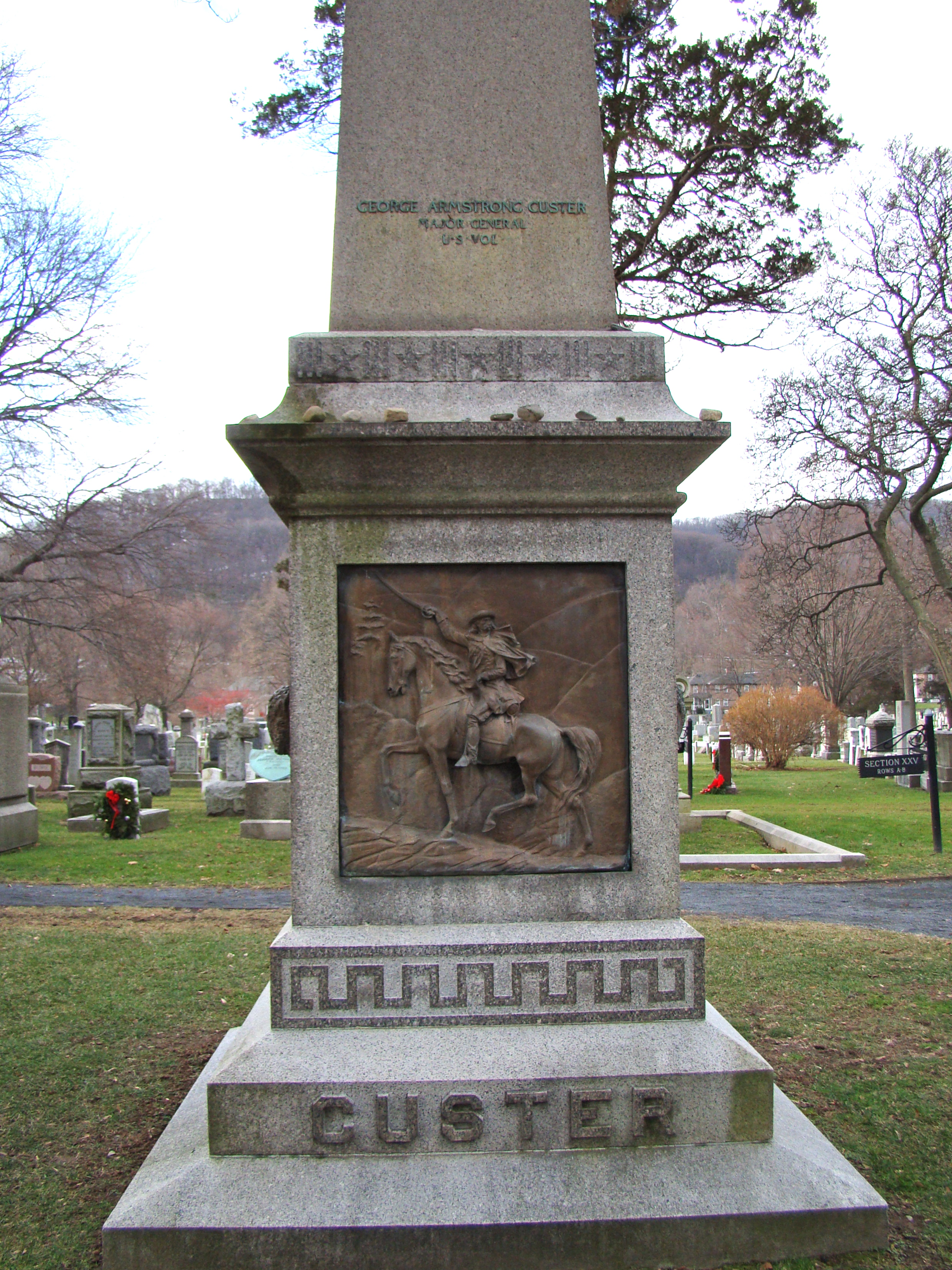
- Custer monument next to his grave in the West Point Cemetery
- For George Armstrong Custer
- Unveiled: 1879
- Location: 41°23′59.68″N 73°58′1.43″W near Highland Falls, New York

Burials by war
- Great Sioux War of 1876-77
- "Custer"

Custer Monument is a monument at the United States Military Academy Cemetery, in honor of Lieutenant Colonel George Armstrong Custer who was killed along with his immediate command at the Battle of the Little Bighorn on 25 June 1876. Congress approved of a statue, to be made from 20 condemned bronze cannons, and for $10,000, of which $6,000 had been subscribed by citizens of New York. The monument was originally located near the academy's headquarters building near the site of present-day Taylor Hall along Thayer Road.

Unveiled in August 1879, the pedestal had a bronze statue of Custer wielding a saber and a pistol. The American novelist Henry Morford wrote the song "Hail! and Farewell to Custer" for the unveiling ceremony, and it was performed by a quartet that included the operatic baritone William H. MacDonald. Custer's widow and many officers did not approve of Custer's depiction in the statue and after only five years, it was removed and sent to New York City where Stanford White was supposed to remove the bust, to be displayed in the library. However, after White's murder, its whereabouts have since been lost. The pedestal was moved to Custer's grave site in the West Point Cemetery during the construction of Taylor Hall around 1910. In 1965, a stone obelisk was placed atop the pedestal.

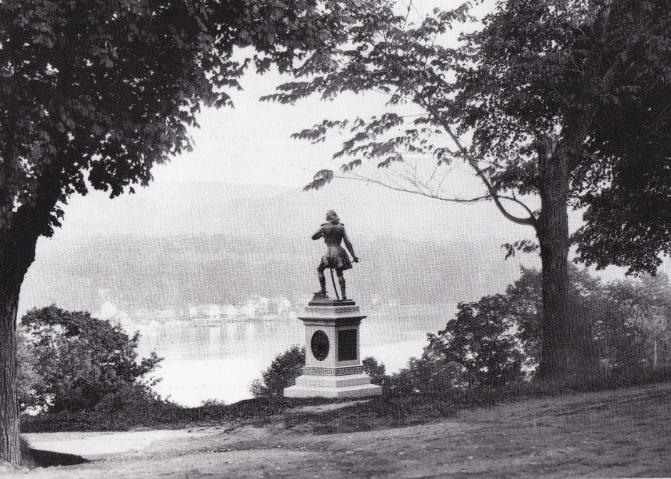
The monument and statue at its original location c1880
