= Boston Ideal Opera Company =

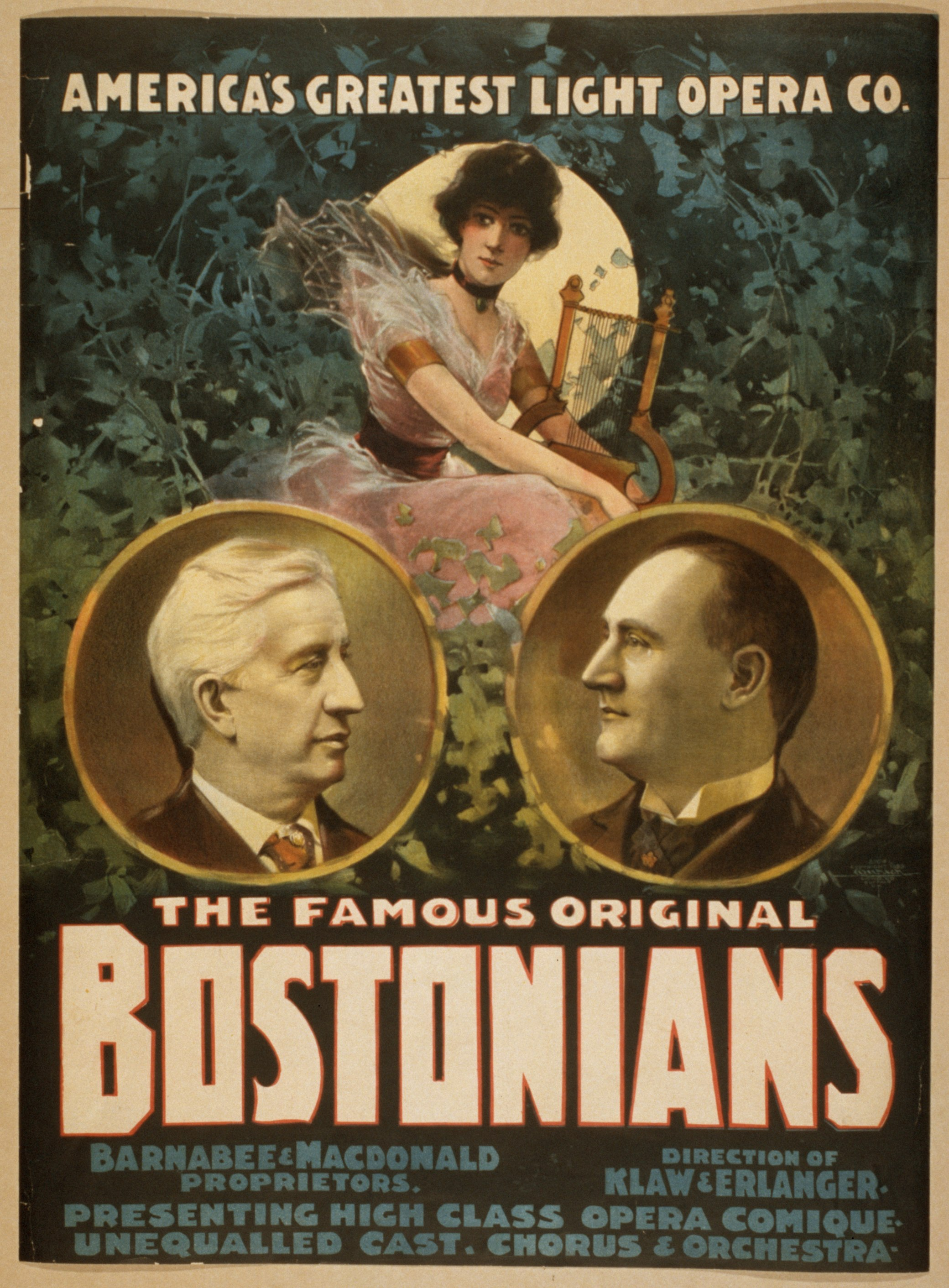
- 1899 poster for The Bostonians
- Formation: 1878
- Founder: Effie Hinckley Ober
- Dissolved: 1905
- Type: comic opera company
- Location: Boston, Massachusetts

The Boston Ideal Opera Company, later The Bostonians, was a comic opera acting company based in Boston from 1878 through 1905.

== History ==
Effie Hinckley Ober (1843–1927) started the group to perform an "ideal" production of H.M.S. Pinafore in Boston. The company first performed Pinafore in November 1878 on a boat in a lake in Boston's Oakland Park. It was a success, and the company continued. It engaged well-regarded concert singers and opened on 14 April 1879 at the 3,000-seat Boston Theatre. The critics agreed that the company fulfilled its goal of presenting an "ideal" production. The Boston Journal reported that the audience was "wrought up by the entertainment to a point of absolute approval". The company went on to become one of the most successful touring companies in America.

When the top actors later took over the group around 1887, it became "The Bostonians."

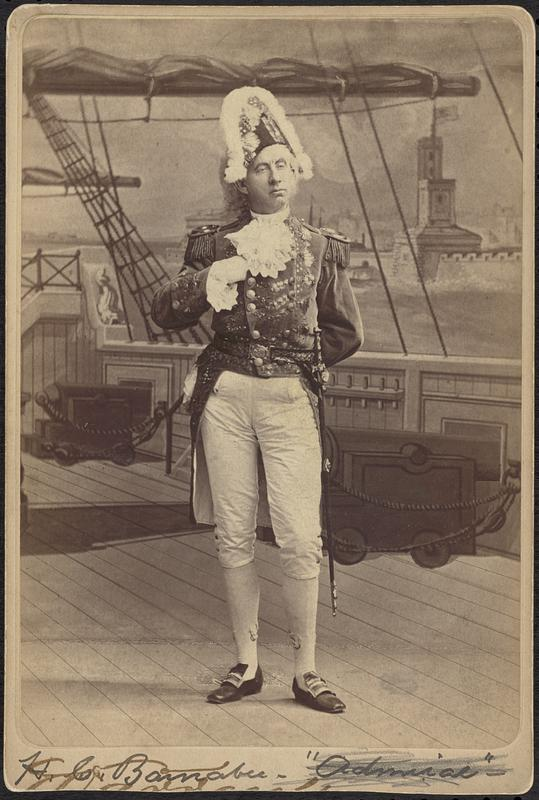
H. C. Barnabee - "admiral", ca. 1879. from the Cabinet Card Collection of the Boston Public Library

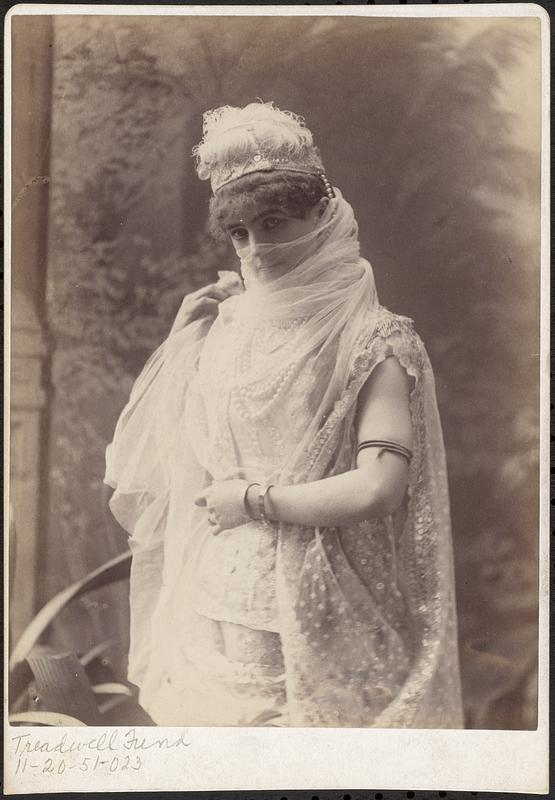
Zephie Dinsmore, ca. 1877–1879; from the Cabinet Card Collection of the Boston Public Library

Actors in the group included Henry Clay Barnabee, Jessie Bartlett Davis, Hilda Clark, Mena Cleary, W. H. MacDonald, Eugene Cowles, Tom Karl, Marie Stone-MacDonald, William Lavin, Geraldine Ulmar and Alice Nielsen. Other actors in the group for spells included Camille D'Arville, Bertha Waltzinger, Myron W. Whitney., Kirke La Shelle, and Zephie Dinsmore.

== Selected productions ==
- H.M.S. Pinafore (first performed in Boston, April 1879)
- Robin Hood (1890)
- Prince Ananias (1894)
- The Serenade (1897)
