= Victor Herbert =

Irish-American composer (1859–1924)

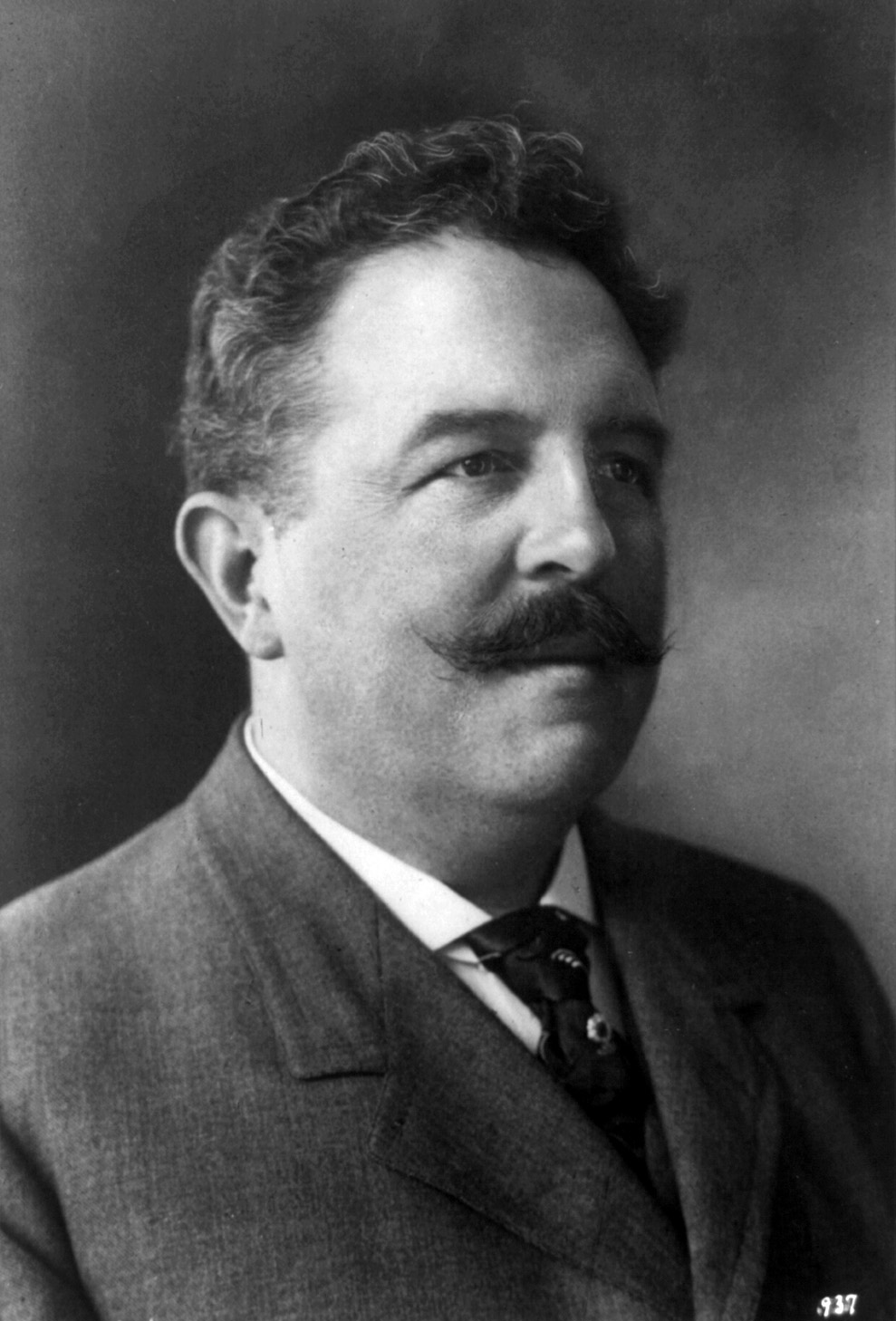
Victor Herbert in 1906

Victor August Herbert (February 1, 1859 – May 26, 1924) was an American composer, cellist and conductor of English and Irish ancestry and German training. Although Herbert enjoyed important careers as a cello soloist and conductor, he is best known for composing many successful operettas that premiered on Broadway from the 1890s to World War I. He was also prominent among the Tin Pan Alley composers and was later a founder of the American Society of Composers, Authors, and Publishers (ASCAP). A prolific composer, Herbert produced two operas, a cantata, 43 operettas, incidental music to 10 plays, 31 compositions for orchestra, nine band compositions, nine cello compositions, five violin compositions with piano or orchestra, 22 piano compositions and numerous songs, choral compositions and orchestrations of works by other composers, among other music.

In the early 1880s, Herbert began a career as a cellist in Vienna and Stuttgart, during which he began to compose orchestral music. Herbert and his opera singer wife, Therese Förster, moved to the U.S. in 1886 when both were engaged by the Metropolitan Opera. In the U.S., Herbert continued his performing career, while also teaching at the National Conservatory of Music, conducting and composing. His most notable instrumental compositions were his Cello Concerto No. 2 in E minor, Op. 30 (1894), which entered the standard repertoire, and his Auditorium Festival March (1901). He conducted the Pittsburgh Symphony from 1898 to 1904 (taking over from founding conductor Frederic Archer) and then founded the Victor Herbert Orchestra, which he conducted throughout the rest of his life.

Herbert began to compose operettas in 1894, producing several successes, including The Serenade (1897) and The Fortune Teller (1898). Some of the operettas that he wrote after the turn of the 20th century were even more successful: Babes in Toyland (1903), Mlle. Modiste (1905), The Red Mill (1906), Naughty Marietta (1910), Sweethearts (1913) and Eileen (1917). After World War I, with the change of popular musical tastes, Herbert began to compose musicals and contributed music to other composers' shows. While some of these were well-received, he never again achieved the level of success that he had enjoyed with his most popular operettas.

== Biography ==
=== Early life and education ===
Herbert was born on the island of Guernsey to Frances "Fanny" Muspratt (née Lover; c. 1833 – c. 1915) and August Herbert, of whom nothing is known. He was baptized on July 11, 1859, in the Evangelical Lutheran Church in Freiburg, Baden, Germany. From 1853, Fanny was separated from her first husband, Frederic Muspratt, who divorced her in 1861 when he found out that she had conceived Herbert by another man. His mother told Herbert that he had been born in Dublin, and he believed this all his life, listing Ireland as his birthplace on his 1902 American naturalization petition and on his 1914 American passport application. Herbert appears to have had no knowledge of his half-sister Angela Lucy Winifred Muspratt, an artist (born 1851) or his half-brother Frederic Percy (1853–1856). The Muspratts, a family of chemical industrialists in Liverpool, raised Angela after the divorce. Herbert and his mother lived with his maternal grandfather, the Irish novelist, playwright, poet and composer Samuel Lover, from 1862 to 1866 in Sevenoaks, Kent, England. Lover welcomed a steady flow of musicians, writers and artists to their home. Herbert joined his mother in Stuttgart, Germany in 1867, a year after she had married a German physician, Carl Theodor Schmid of Langenargen. Herbert's younger half-brother, Wilhelm Marius Schmid, was born there in 1870. In Stuttgart he received a strong liberal education at the Eberhard-Ludwigs-Gymnasium, which included musical training.

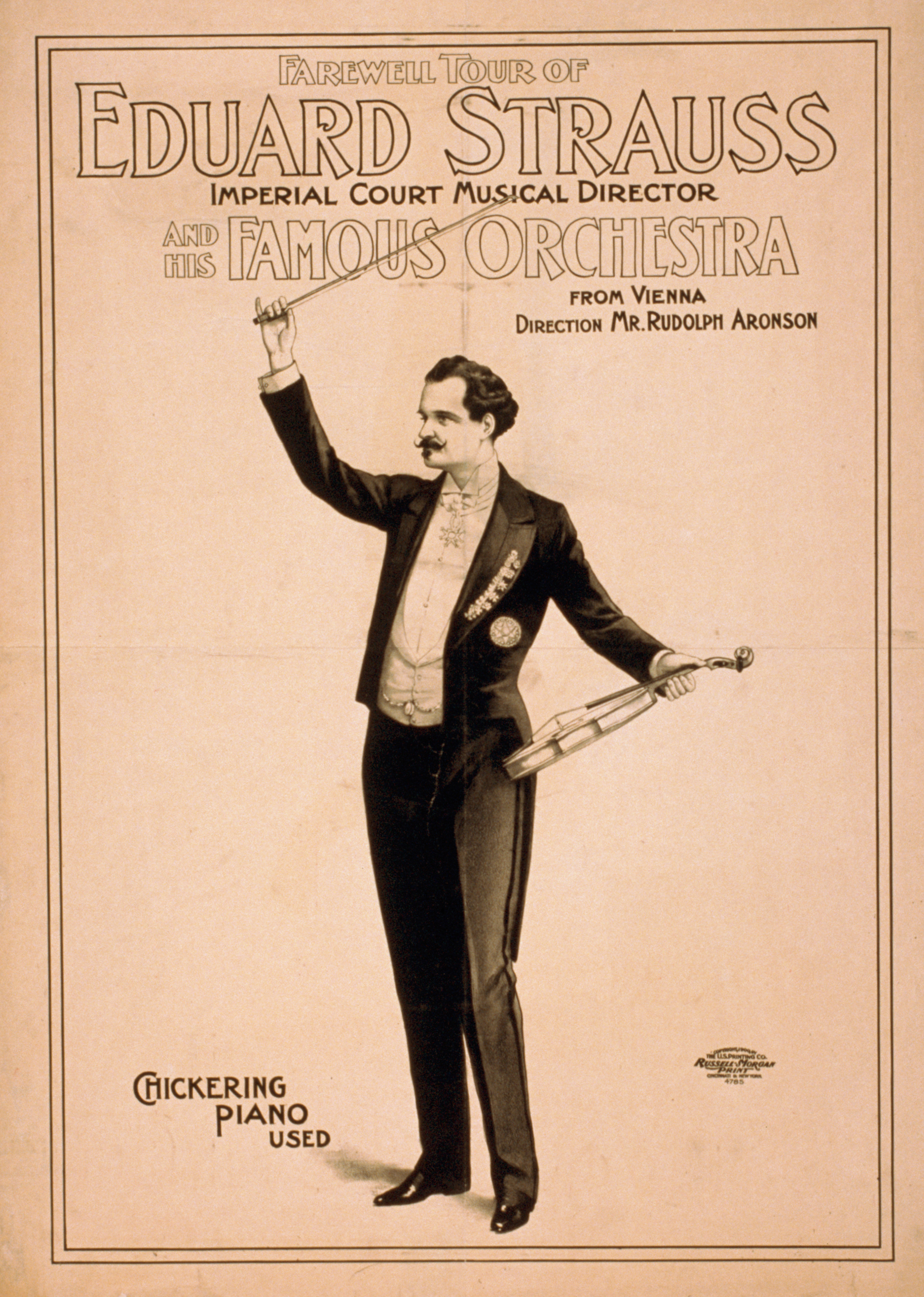
Concert poster for Eduard Strauss's orchestra

Herbert initially planned to pursue a career as a medical doctor. Although his stepfather was related by blood to German royalty, his financial situation was not good by the time Herbert was a teenager. Medical education in Germany was expensive, and so Herbert focused instead on music. He initially studied the piano, flute and piccolo but ultimately settled on the cello, beginning studies on that instrument with Bernhard Cossmann from age 15 to age 18. He then attended the Stuttgart Conservatory. After studying cello, music theory and composition under Max Seifritz, Herbert graduated with a diploma in 1879.

=== Early career and the move to the U.S. ===
Even before studying with Cossmann, Herbert was engaged professionally as a player in concerts in Stuttgart. His first orchestra position was as a flute and piccolo player, but he soon turned solely to the cello. By the time he was 19, Herbert had received engagements as a soloist with several major German orchestras. He played in the orchestra of the wealthy Russian Baron Paul von Derwies for a few years and in 1880 was a soloist for a year in the orchestra of Eduard Strauss in Vienna. Herbert joined the court orchestra in Stuttgart in 1881, where he remained for the next five years. There he composed his first pieces of instrumental music, playing the solos in the premieres of his first two large-scale works, the Suite for cello and orchestra, Op. 3 (1883) and the Cello Concerto No. 1, Op. 8. In 1883, Herbert was selected by Johannes Brahms to play in a chamber orchestra for the celebration of the life of Franz Liszt, then 72 years old, near Zurich.

In 1885 Herbert became romantically involved with Therese Förster (1861–1927), a soprano who had recently joined the court opera for which the court orchestra played. Förster sang several leading roles at the Stuttgart Opera in 1885 through the summer of 1886. After a year of courtship, the couple married on August 14, 1886. On October 24, 1886, they moved to the United States, as they both had been hired by Walter Damrosch and Anton Seidl to join the Metropolitan Opera in New York City. Herbert was engaged as the opera orchestra's principal cellist, and Förster was engaged to sing principal roles. During the voyage to America, Herbert and his wife became friends with their fellow passenger and future conductor at the Metropolitan Opera, Anton Seidl, and other singers joining the Met.

=== Initial musical life in New York City ===
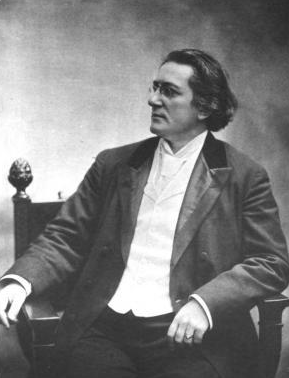
Anton Seidl, Herbert's mentor and friend

Seidl became an important mentor to Herbert and took a particular interest in fostering Herbert's skills as a conductor. Upon arriving in New York, Herbert and Förster became active members of New York's German music community, socializing and networking at cafes such as Luchow's. At these cafes, Herbert handed out business cards saying, "solo cellist from the Royal Orchestra of his Majesty, the King of Württemberg. Instructor in cello, vocal music and harmony." Herbert hoped to pick up extra income teaching, since he was earning only $40 to $50 a week as a cellist in the Met's orchestra.

Meanwhile, in her first season at the Met, 1886–87, Förster sang several roles in German, including the title role of the Queen of Sheba in Goldmark's Die Königin von Saba, Elsa in Lohengrin, Irene in Wagner's Rienzi, the title role in the Met premiere of Verdi's Aida and Elizabeth in Tannhäuser. She earned praise from critics and audiences alike and was featured on the cover of the Musical Courier, a major music magazine of the day. The next season, she repeated the role of Elsa but then left the Met and then sang with the German-language Thalia Theatre, again earning good reviews. Although she sang for several more years, her career did not progress. Nevertheless, happy in New York, Herbert and Förster decided to remain in America after their first season at the Metropolitan Opera and eventually became citizens.

Herbert quickly became prominent in New York City's musical scene, making his first American solo appearance on the cello in a performance of his own Suite for Cello and Orchestra, Op. 3, with Walter Damrosch conducting the Symphony Society of New York at the Metropolitan Opera House on January 8, 1887. The New York Herald said of the event, "[Herbert's] style is infinitely more easy and graceful than that of most cello players". This warm reception quickly led to more solo engagements that year, including performances of his own Berceuse and Polonais. Herbert continued to appear as a cello soloist with major American orchestras into the 1910s. In the fall of 1887, he formed his own 40-piece orchestra, the Majestic Orchestra Internationale, which he conducted and in which he served as cello soloist. Although the orchestra survived for only one season, it performed in several of New York's most important concert halls. The same year, he founded the New York String Quartet together with violinists Sam Franko and Henry Boewig, and violist Ludwig Schenck. The group's first concert was on December 8, 1887, and it continued to give free-admittance concerts for several years at Steinway Hall, earning enthusiastic critical praise.

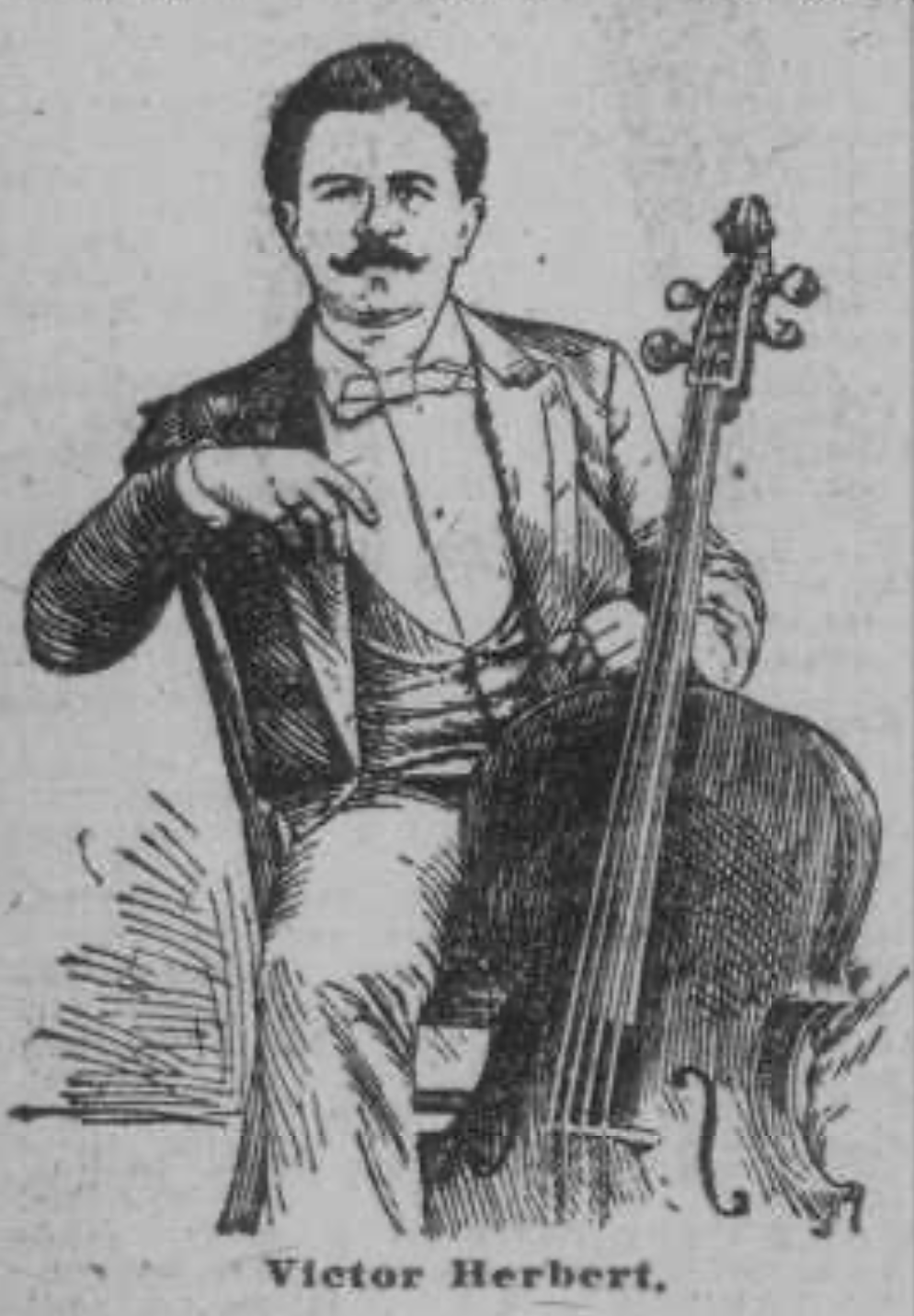
1896 sketch from The Philadelphia Inquirer

During the Summer of 1888, Herbert became Seidl's assistant conductor of the New York Philharmonic's ten-week summer concert seasons on the Boardwalk at Brighton Beach. Seidl's concert seasons made Brighton Beach an important New York musical venue each summer. Herbert conducted the 80-piece orchestra in lighter works paired with more serious repertoire at summer concerts and festivals over the next few years. Herbert's association with the New York Philharmonic ended in 1898, after 11 seasons of serving variously as an assistant conductor, guest conductor and solo cellist. In Fall 1888, soprano Emma Juchs hired Herbert to music-direct a "concert party" tour of cities and towns in the midwest that had seen little art music, presenting a quartet of singers in varied programs of songs, operatic scenes and arias to new audiences. The accompaniment was usually pianist Adele Aus de Ohe and Herbert at the cello. The group presented their concerts to wealthy patrons at fashionable private parties and at mostly smaller venues to local audiences, educating them about opera, art songs and contemporary music.

=== Conducting and composing successes ===
On December 1, 1888, Seidl programmed Herbert's Serenade for String Orchestra, Op. 12 as part of a concert at Steinway Hall, with the composer conducting. In January 1889, Herbert and violinist Max Bendix were the soloists in the American premiere of the challenging Double Concerto, Op. 102 for Violin, Cello and Orchestra by Brahms. Conductor Theodore Thomas then invited Herbert to conduct and perform with him in Chicago. In 1889, Herbert formed the Metropolitan Trio Club with Bendix and pianist Reinhold L. Herman. The Musical Courier gave effusive praise to both Herbert's compositions ("refined taste, abundant melodic invention") and his playing: "As a violoncellist, Mr. Herbert ranks with the foremost alive". Seidl brought Herbert, Förster, Bendix, Juchs, Ohe and Lilli Lehmann, together with a large orchestra and 500-voice chorus, to Pittsburgh, Pennsylvania in May 1889 as part of a big music festival to celebrate the new Exposition Building. That December he was a soloist with the Boston Symphony Orchestra led by Arthur Nikisch for the opening of Lincoln Music Hall in Washington, D.C.

Herbert also played and conducted for the Worcester Music Festival, where he returned repeatedly through the 1890s. In the autumn of 1889, Herbert also joined the faculty of the National Conservatory of Music, where he taught cello and music composition for several years. In 1890, he was appointed the conductor of the Boston Festival Orchestra, serving there in seasons through 1893, in addition to all of his conducting commitments elsewhere. In 1891, Herbert premiered an ambitious cantata, The Captive, for solo voices, chorus and full orchestra. His Irish Rhapsody (1892), written for the Gaelic Society of New York enjoyed a brief but intense period of popularity.

Photo from Prince Ananias (1894), Herbert's first operetta

He became director of the 22nd Regimental Band of the New York National Guard in 1894, succeeding its founder, Patrick Gilmore and Gilmore's unsuccessful immediate successor David Wallis Reeves. Herbert toured widely with the 22nd Regimental Band through 1900, performing both his own band compositions and works from the orchestral repertory that he transcribed for the band. Beginning in 1894, when he began composing operettas, Herbert's band marches were sometimes derived from material from the operettas. Throughout his career, Herbert was well liked by orchestra players for his modesty and unpretentiousness. Herbert continued to compose orchestral music, writing one of his finest works, the Cello Concerto No. 2 in E minor, Op. 30, which premiered in 1894.

In 1898, Herbert became the principal conductor of the Pittsburgh Symphony, a position he held until 1904. Under his leadership, the orchestra became a major American ensemble and was favorably compared by music critics with ensembles like the New York Philharmonic and Boston Symphony Orchestra. The orchestra toured to several major cities during Herbert's years as conductor, notably premiering Herbert's Auditorium Festival March for the celebration of the twelfth anniversary of Chicago's Auditorium Theatre in 1901. After a disagreement with the management of the Pittsburgh Symphony in 1904, Herbert resigned, founding the Victor Herbert Orchestra. He conducted their programs of light orchestral music paired with more serious repertoire (as he had done earlier with Anton Seidl's Brighton Beach orchestra concerts) at summer resorts and on tours for most of his remaining years. His orchestra made many acoustical recordings for both Edison Records, from 1909 to 1911, and the Victor Talking Machine Company, from 1911 to 1923. Herbert was also a cello soloist in several Victor recordings as well.

=== Activist for the legal rights of composers ===
In the early years of the twentieth century, Herbert championed the right of composers to profit from their works. In 1909, he testified before the United States Congress, influencing the formation and development of the Copyright Act of 1909. This law helped to secure the rights of composers to charge royalties on the sales of sound recordings.

Herbert led a group of composers and publishers in founding the American Society of Composers, Authors, and Publishers (ASCAP) on February 13, 1914, becoming its vice-president and director until his death in 1924. The organization has historically worked to protect the rights of songwriters and music publishers and continues to do this work today. In 1917, Herbert won a landmark lawsuit before the United States Supreme Court that gave composers, through ASCAP, a right to charge performance fees for the public performance of their music. ASCAP commissioned a bust in Herbert's honor in New York City's Central Park, erected in 1927.

=== Operetta, opera and musical theatre ===
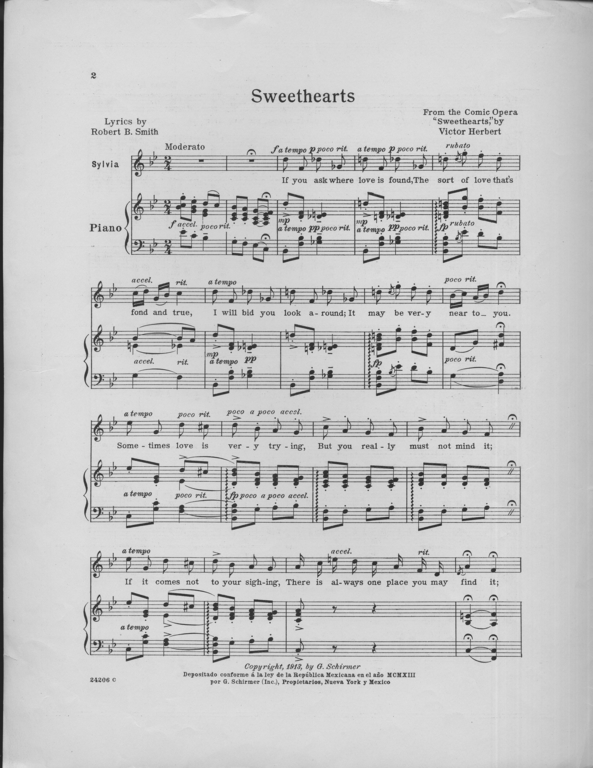
Sheet music for the title song from Sweethearts

In 1894 Herbert composed his first operetta, Prince Ananias, for a popular troupe known as The Bostonians. The piece was well received, and Herbert soon composed three more operettas for Broadway, The Wizard of the Nile (1895), The Serenade (1897), which enjoyed international success, and The Fortune Teller (1898), starring Alice Nielsen. Although these achieved popularity, Herbert did not produce any more stage works for several years, focusing on his work with the Pittsburgh Symphony until 1904. Just before leaving that orchestra, he returned to Broadway with his first major hit, Babes in Toyland (1903). Two more successes followed, Mlle. Modiste (1905) and The Red Mill (1906), which solidified Herbert as one of the best-known American composers. He was elected to the National Institute of Arts and Letters in 1908.

Although Herbert's reputation lies with his operettas, he also composed two grand operas. He searched for several years for a libretto that appealed to him, finally finding one by Joseph D. Redding called Natoma that concerned a historical story set in California. He composed the work from 1909 to 1910, and it premiered in Philadelphia on February 25, 1911, with soprano Mary Garden in the title role and the young Irish tenor John McCormack in his American operatic debut. The opera was repeated as part of the company's repertory during the next three seasons. It also enjoyed performances in New York City, making its debut there on February 28, 1911. Herbert's other opera, Madeleine, was a much lighter work in one act. On January 24, 1914, it had its premiere at the Metropolitan Opera, but it was not revived beyond that season.

During this period, Herbert continued to compose operettas, producing two of his most successful works, Naughty Marietta (1910) and Sweethearts (1913). He also became progressively more involved with Irish-American organizations: in 1908 he joined the Friendly Sons of St. Patrick (becoming president in 1916), the oldest Irish association in New York, and in 1911 he became a member of the American Irish Historical Society. In early 1916, he became the founding president of the Friends of Irish Freedom and became active in the cause of Irish nationalism. Another operetta, Eileen (1917, originally entitled Hearts of Erin), was the fulfillment of Herbert's desire to compose an Irish-themed operetta and a tribute to his grandfather's novel Rory O'More. The piece is set during the Irish Rebellion of 1798 and contains a rich score; it debuted in time to mark the first anniversary of the 1916 Easter Rising in Ireland. This was the end of Herbert's greatest period of producing full scores for operettas. In late 1916 Herbert also orchestrated "Soldiers of Erin", an English language version of what would later be adopted as the Irish national anthem; it was widely performed in the US from early 1917.

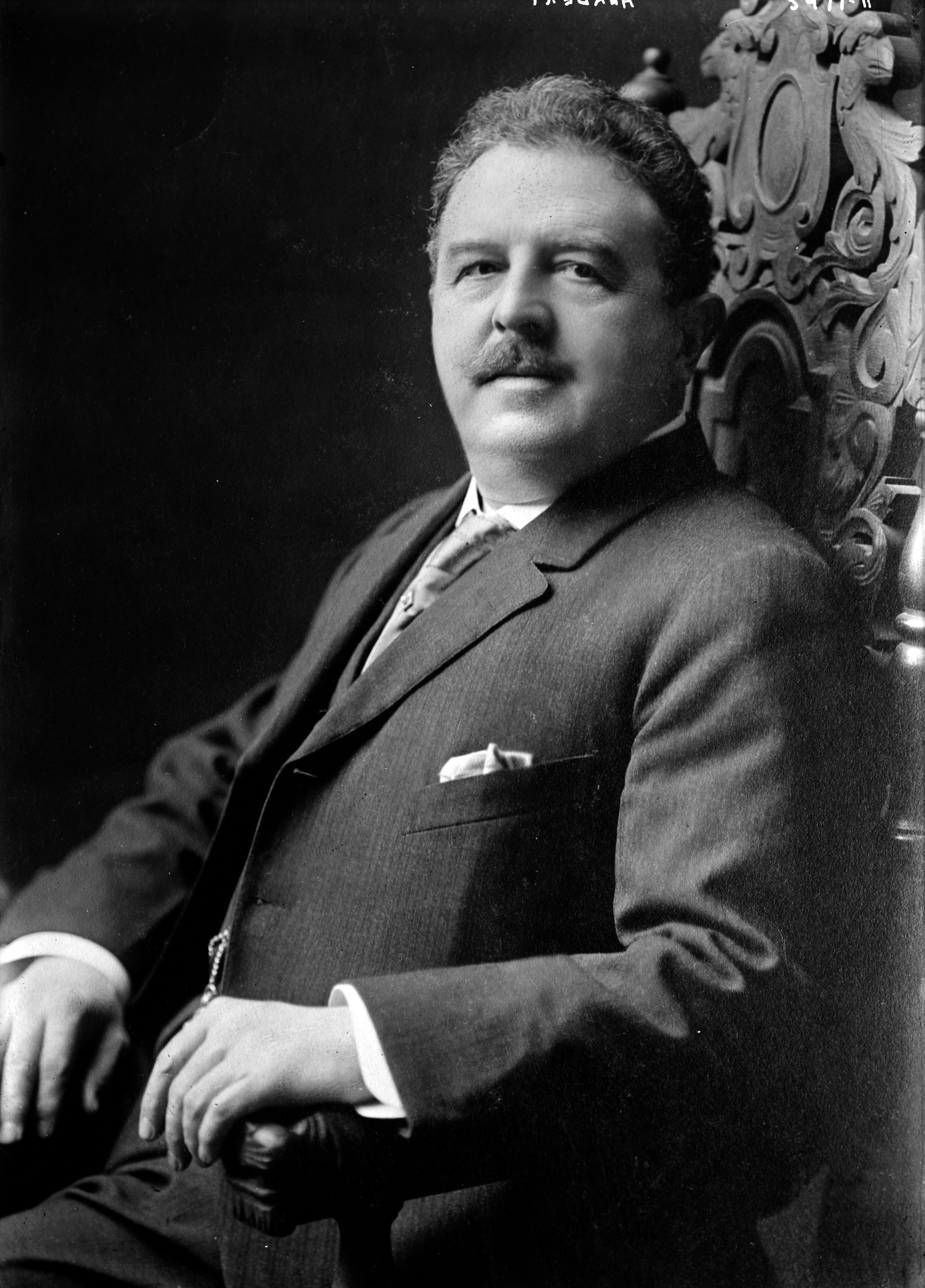
Herbert at the height of his success

By World War I, with the birth of jazz, ragtime and new dance styles like the foxtrot and tango, Herbert reluctantly switched to writing musical comedies. These featured less elaborate ensembles and simpler songs for less classically trained singers than the European-style operettas that had dominated his earlier career. Herbert, during the last years of his career, was frequently asked to compose ballet music for the elaborate production numbers in Broadway revues and the shows of Irving Berlin and Jerome Kern, among others. He was also a contributor to the Ziegfeld Follies every year from 1917 to 1924.

Herbert summered at Lake Placid, New York. In 1918, he played the cello there (the first time after retiring 20 years earlier) in a benefit concert for the Red Cross.

== Death and legacy ==
A healthy man throughout his life, Herbert died suddenly of a heart attack at the age of 65 on May 26, 1924, shortly after his final show, The Dream Girl, began its pre-Broadway run in New Haven, Connecticut. He was survived by his wife and two children, Ella Victoria Herbert Bartlett and Clifford Victor Herbert. He was entombed in Woodlawn Cemetery in The Bronx, New York City.

Herbert and his music are celebrated in the 1939 film The Great Victor Herbert, where he was portrayed by Walter Connolly and which also featured Mary Martin. He was also portrayed by Paul Maxey in the 1946 film Till the Clouds Roll By. Many of Herbert's own works were made into films, and his music has been used in numerous films and television shows. In 1940 the U.S. Postal Service included Herbert in its Famous Americans series of stamps. A Chicago elementary school is named for him. During World War II the Liberty ship SS Victor Herbert was built in Panama City, Florida, and named in his honor. Ireland's RTÉ Lyric FM's feature "Victor Herbert, Son of Dublin" was Silver Radio Winner at the 2019 New York Festivals International Radio Awards in the category best biographical documentary.

== Works ==
Herbert was a prolific composer, producing two operas, one cantata, 43 operettas, incidental music to 10 stage productions, 31 compositions for orchestra, nine band compositions, nine cello compositions, five violin compositions with piano or orchestra, 22 piano compositions, one flute and clarinet duet with orchestra, numerous songs, including many for the Ziegfeld Follies, and other works, 12 choral compositions, and numerous orchestrations of works by other composers, among other compositions. He also composed The Fall of a Nation (1916), one of the first original orchestral scores for a full-length film. The score was thought to be lost, but it turned up in the film-music collection of the Library of Congress. It was given a recording in 1987.

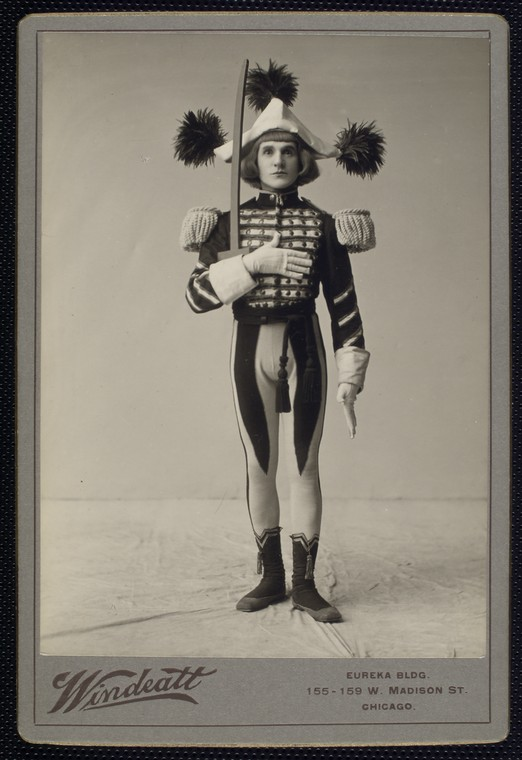
A "toy soldier" from Babes in Toyland (1903), Herbert's first major success

As a composer, Herbert is chiefly remembered for his operettas. Of his instrumental works, only a few remained consistently within the concert repertoire after Herbert's death. However, some of his forgotten works have enjoyed a resurgence of popularity within the last couple decades.

=== Operettas and other stage music ===
Besides those mentioned above, other Herbert operettas with particularly strong scores are Cyrano de Bergerac (1899), The Singing Girl (1899), The Enchantress (1911), The Madcap Duchess (1913), and The Only Girl (1914). Other shows that were popular include It Happened in Nordland (1904), Miss Dolly Dollars (1905), Dream City (1906), The Magic Knight (1906), Little Nemo (1908), The Lady of the Slipper (1912), The Princess Pat (1915) and My Golden Girl (1920). In addition to composing about 55 full scores for stage works, Herbert produced a considerable body of musical numbers for variety shows such as the Ziegfeld Follies and the sophisticated private entertainments for the Lambs theatrical club.

Herbert's early shows toured widely, usually including a Broadway run to further publicize the tour. As Broadway increasingly became essential to commercial theatrical success, Herbert designed his shows to appeal specifically to New York sensibilities. Although consistently praised for his music, many of Herbert's operettas were criticized by theatre critics for their weak librettos and conventional lyrics. By the mid-20th century, revivals of Herbert's works were relatively rare. His shows were revived occasionally on Broadway until 1947, but not thereafter. In the 1970s and 1980s, however, the operettas began to be revived more frequently, albeit often with heavily rewritten librettos, by companies like the Light Opera of Manhattan and Ohio Light Opera, and revivals continue today.

=== Herbert's style ===
American musical theatre composers of the late nineteenth century tended to imitate either Viennese operetta or the works of Gilbert and Sullivan. Many American theatre companies, such as The Bostonians, were established for the purpose of performing Gilbert and Sullivan's operas, such as H.M.S. Pinafore and The Mikado, and adaptations of Karl Millöcker's operettas, such as Der Bettelstudent, or Franz von Suppé's Boccaccio, all of which became popular in America. Herbert tailored his operettas to be performed by companies that performed these works. His background made him intimately familiar with Viennese operetta. Indeed, the most characteristic Herbert song was the waltz, and many of his waltzes became highly popular in spite of their high musical demands.

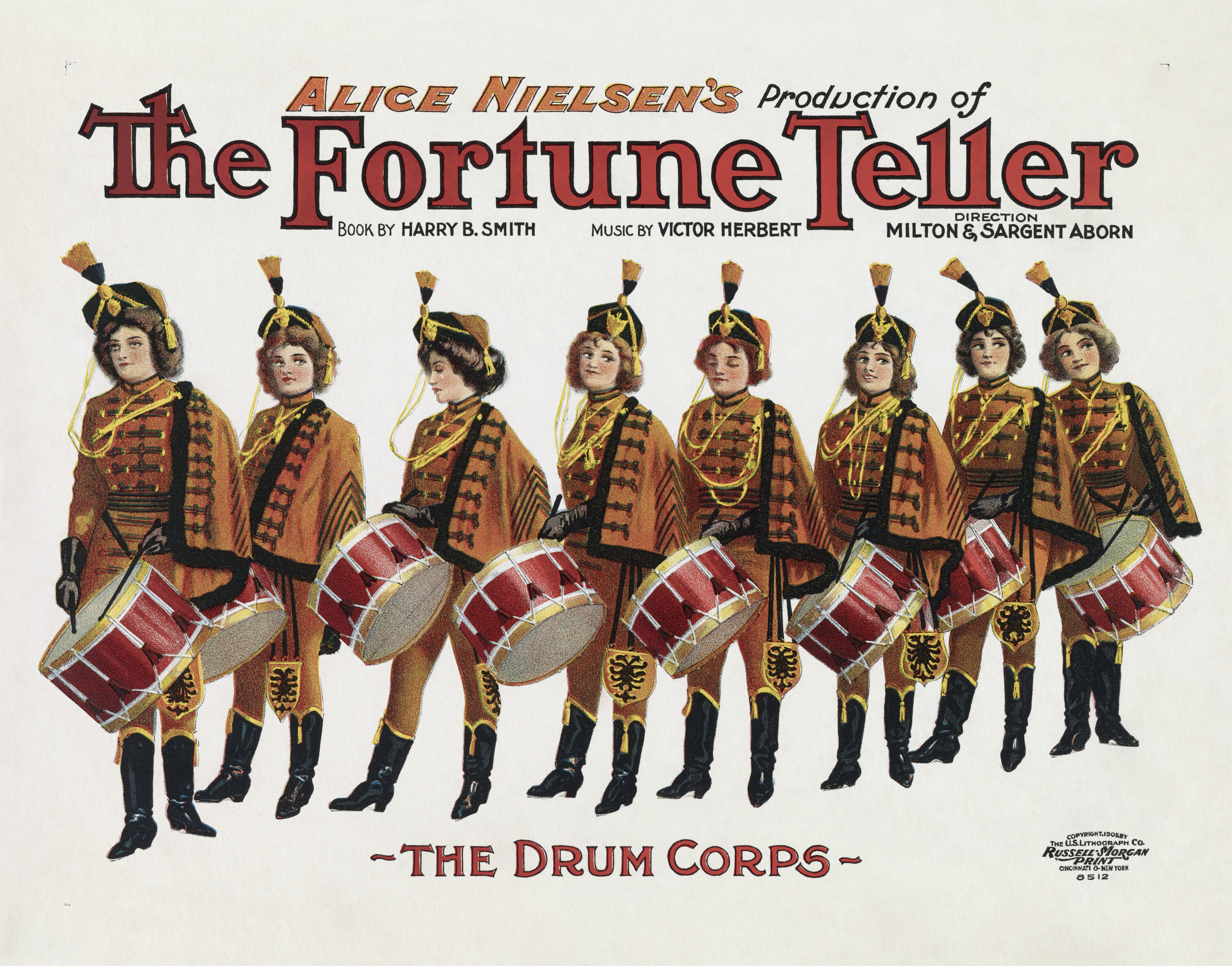
The Fortune Teller drum corps

Herbert is also known for his "variation" songs, which consist either of a series of refrains displaying different styles, or of several variations of the same melody. For example, "Serenades of All Nations" from The Fortune Teller demonstrates serenades from colourful national traditions, sung and danced by a ballerina. "The Song of the Poet" from Babes in Toyland provides variations on the lullaby "Rock-a-bye Baby" by presenting it first as a brassy march, then in Neapolitan style, and finally as a cakewalk. The best of Herbert's operetta music is challenging, calling for trained singers. He often wrote his operettas with a particular singer in mind. During his career he had occasion to work with three great prima donnas: Alice Nielsen, Fritzi Scheff, and Emma Trentini. For them, he wrote leading parts in The Fortune Teller and The Singing Girl (Nielsen), Babette, Mlle. Modiste, The Prima Donna and Mlle Rosita (Scheff), and Naughty Marietta (Trentini). He would also write shows for popular comedians of the day or noted producers. Some of these were spectacular successes (The Red Mill, written for the comedy team of David C. Montgomery and Fred Stone, was Herbert's most financially successful show.), while others were dismal failures (When Sweet Sixteen, written for Joe Weber, who pulled out of the production, which lasted only twelve performances on Broadway.).

Although Herbert had not been exposed to Gilbert and Sullivan before his arrival in the U.S. in 1886, their popularity led him to adopt some of their musical and dramatic sensibilities. An example of this is the quintet "Cleopatra's Wedding Day" from The Wizard of the Nile. One of his early successes, The Serenade, borrows many of its situations from Ruddigore, Iolanthe and The Pirates of Penzance. The work's librettist, Harry B. Smith, went on to steal more Gilbertian ideas for future operettas with Herbert, who often would complement these ideas with music reminiscent of Sullivan. The Singing Girl, co-written by Smith and Stanislaus Stange, recalls The Mikado, and includes the plot element of a law against kissing without a licence.

Sheet music of "The Streets of New York" from The Red Mill

Herbert tended to use a slightly larger orchestra than Sullivan did in his comic operas, mostly through use of more types of percussion and occasionally by adding a harp. He generally wrote his own orchestrations, which were admired by music critics and other composers. In revivals of his works, however, new orchestrations have substituted saxophones and brass for strings. For many years, the only recording available of a Herbert show using his original orchestrations was one of Naughty Marietta, produced by the Smithsonian in 1981. Only recently have more recordings of his operettas appeared with the original orchestrations intact. These include Naughty Marietta, Mlle. Modiste, Eileen, Sweethearts and The Red Mill by Ohio Light Opera and The Fortune Teller by The Comic Opera Guild, which also has recorded numerous Herbert operettas live in concert with two-piano accompaniment.

Like Sullivan, Herbert also frequently evokes and imitates music from distant places in his operettas. He uses elements of Spanish music in The Serenade, Italian music in Naughty Marietta, Austrian music in The Singing Girl and Eastern music in The Wizard of the Nile, The Idol's Eye, The Tattooed Man and other works set in places like Egypt and India. The Fortune Teller includes an energetic Hungarian csárdás. He also frequently interpolated Irish-style songs into his operettas which, with the exception of those in Eileen, rarely advanced the plot.

By World War I, musical tastes were shifting in America, and Herbert was forced to compose in a simpler musical style. Many of his later works, such as The Velvet Lady and Angel Face (both 1919), imitated popular new song-types like the foxtrot, ragtime and the tango. Even in some of his earlier works, such as The Red Mill (1906), Herbert was already adopting elements that would later become associated with musical comedy in America. His collaboration on The Century Girl (1916) with Irving Berlin displayed this simpler style. Although these later shows introduced some memorable numbers, they did not enjoy the enduring popularity of his most popular operettas. The most successful work of his later career was Orange Blossoms (1921), which included the popular waltz song, "A Kiss in the Dark".

=== Operas ===
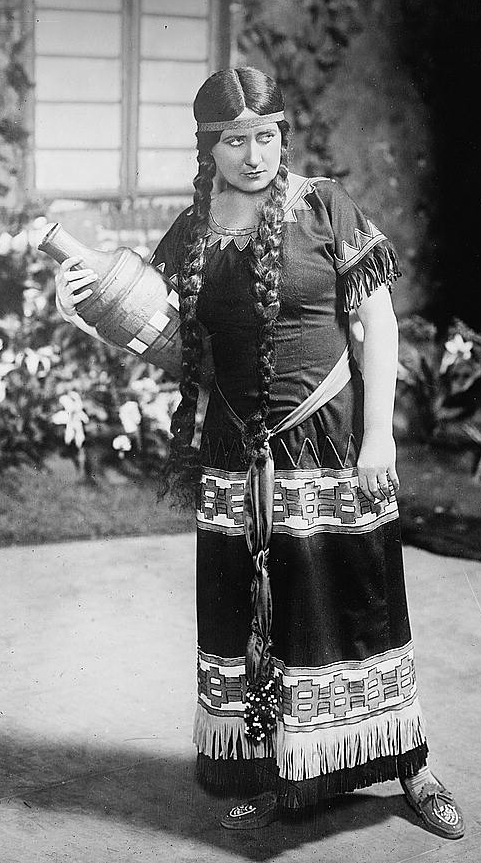
Mary Garden in the title role of Natoma

Although his success had been in light music, like Sullivan, Herbert aspired to compose serious operas. Approached by Oscar Hammerstein I to write a grand opera, Herbert jumped at the chance. Hammerstein announced, in the April 13, 1907, issue of Musical America, a $1,000 prize for the best libretto submitted, fueling public enthusiasm and high expectations. Joseph Redding's libretto for Natoma, set in 1820s California, is a love story between an American naval officer and a Native American princess. The cast included such distinguished singers as John McCormack and Mary Garden, but the 1911 premiere in Philadelphia was only a moderate success. Critics praised the music, including its effective melodies and leitmotifs set off by orchestral counterpoint. They complained, however, about the libretto and the casting of foreign singers in what was supposed to be an "American opera".

Madeleine, his only other opera, is based on a French play and tells the equable little story of an operatic prima donna whose friends and acquaintances, one by one, decline her invitation to dine with her on New Years Day. The work is in one act and premiered in 1914 in a double bill with Enrico Caruso in the leading tenor role in Pagliacci. The opera featured Frances Alda in the title role. It failed to make an impression and received only six performances. Its conversational style is complemented by orchestral motivic commentary. Just before the work opened, Herbert added "A Perfect Day" at Alda's request. Although not a success, because of Herbert's popularity, G. Schirmer took the unprecedented step of publishing the work in full score.

=== Instrumental music ===
After Herbert's death, little of his instrumental music continued to be performed, but within the last couple of decades it has begun to enjoy revivals in concert and recordings. His Cello Concerto No. 2 in E minor, Op. 30, is an exception to this. First performed in 1894, it was received enthusiastically at its premiere and shows the influence of Franz Liszt. Antonín Dvořák, a colleague of Herbert's at the National Conservatory, was inspired to compose his Cello Concerto in B minor, Op. 104, after hearing its premiere. The concerto has been recorded by cellists such as Yo-Yo Ma (with Kurt Masur and the New York Philharmonic), Lynn Harrell (with Sir Neville Marriner and the Academy of St Martin in the Fields), Julian Lloyd Webber (with Sir Charles Mackerras and the London Symphony Orchestra), and an early rare recording by Bernard Greenhouse (with Max Schönherr and the Vienna Symphony Orchestra).

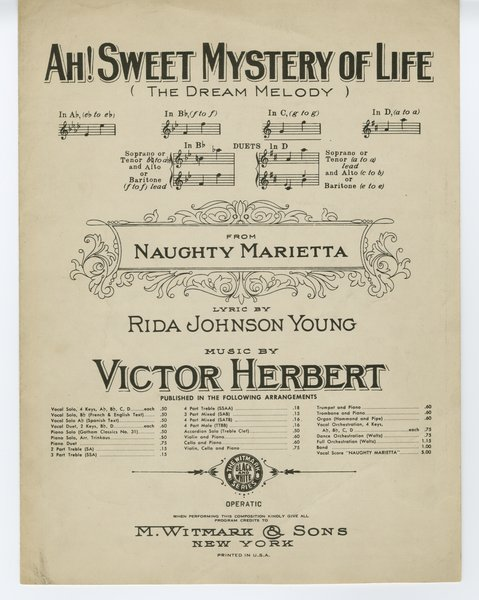

More recently, two of Herbert's earlier compositions for cello and orchestra have regained a place in the concert repertory. The Suite for Cello and Orchestra, Op. 3 (1884), his earliest known composition despite its designation as Op. 3, has been performed by several ensembles in recent years. The work foreshadows the light music of Herbert's later compositions. Another work that has been revived is his Cello Concerto No. 1, which was first performed by the composer in Stuttgart shortly before he came to the U.S. For many years, the work was unpublished and apparently unperformed, surviving only in manuscript. It was recorded for the first time in 1986 and has since been published. The composition is admired for achieving an effective balance between its virtuosic elements and its lyricism.

Of his large-scale orchestral works, Herbert's tone poem Hero and Leander (1901) is his most important. Composed for the Pittsburgh Symphony Orchestra while Herbert was their conductor, the work displays an affinity with both Wagner and Liszt. Another important work that Herbert wrote for the PSO is Columbus, Op. 35, a four-movement programmatic suite. The first and final movements of the suite were composed in 1893 as part of a theatrical spectacle intended for the Colombian Exposition in Chicago. However, Herbert never completed that project, and the central two movements were not composed until 1902. The PSO premiered the work in 1903, and it was the last large-scale symphonic work that Herbert composed.

Herbert also composed a considerable body of smaller-scale works, often writing music for his own performance on the cello or producing individual songs for the Victor Herbert Orchestra. He published some of his dance music compositions under the pseudonym Noble MacClure. During the last decade of his life, he composed a number of overtures for feature films, although The Fall of a Nation was his only complete film score. On February 12, 1924, Herbert was one of the featured composers at New York's Aeolian Hall, in an evening entitled An Experiment in Modern Music that included the world premiere of George Gershwin's Rhapsody in Blue by the Paul Whiteman orchestra. Herbert's contribution for the evening, A Suite of Serenades, was his last work to premiere with him in attendance.

== Recordings ==
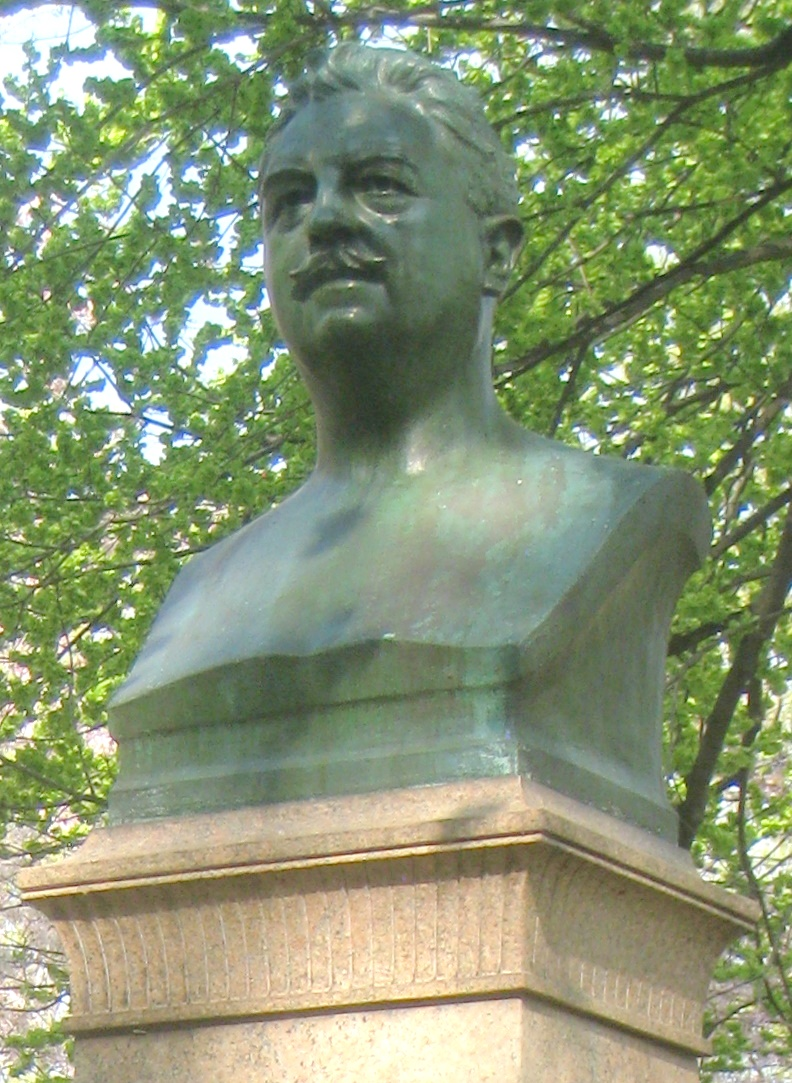
Bust of Victor Herbert by Edmond T. Quinn in Central Park, New York City

The following is a list of some of the best-known recordings of Herbert's music.

- The Music of Victor Herbert, Album C-1, conducted by Nathaniel Shilkret, Victor, 1927
- The Music of Victor Herbert, Album C-11, Victor Salon Group and Orchestra, conducted by Shilkret, RCA Victor, 1930
- The Music of Victor Herbert, C-33, RCA Victor, conducted by Shilkret with soloists, including Jan Peerce, chorus, and orchestra, RCA Victor, 1939; this was recorded immediately after The Magic Key of RCA radio broadcast of the same music.
- The Music of Victor Herbert, recorded by Beverly Sills, soprano, and Andre Kostelanetz, conducting, on Angel records SFO-37160 (1976) (Grammy Award winner)
- Cello Concerto No. 2 in E minor op. 30, recorded by Julian Lloyd Webber, with the London Symphony Orchestra, conducted by Sir Charles Mackerras on EMI Classics 747 622–2
- Cello Concerto No. 2 in E minor op. 30, recorded by Yo-Yo Ma, with the New York Philharmonic, conducted by Kurt Masur on Sony Classical 88697 56112 2
- Cello Concertos recorded by Lynn Harrell, with The Academy of St. Martin in the Fields, conducted by Sir Neville Marriner on Decca 417 672–2
- Cello Concerto No. 2 in E minor op. 30, performed by Georges Miquelle and the Eastman-Rochester Orchestra (i.e. the Orchestra of the Eastman School of Music), conducted by Howard Hanson, recorded for Mercury Records in October 1957, re-issued on CD in 1995, coupled with the Grand Canyon Suite and Mississippi Suite by Ferde Grofe. (Mercury Living Presence CD 434 355–2).
- Victor Herbert Eileen: Romantic Comic Opera in Three Acts (1998) Ohio Light Opera, James Stewart, artistic director; Newport Classic (NPD 85615/2)
- Victor Herbert: Beloved Songs and Classic Miniatures (1999) recorded by Virginia Croskery, soprano, and Keith Brion conducting the Slovak Radio Symphony Orchestra, on the Naxos CD 8.559.26
- The Red Mill: Romantic Opera in Two Acts by Victor Herbert (2001) Ohio Light Opera; L. Lynn Thompson, conductor; Steven Daigle, artistic director; Albany Records (Troy 492/493).
- Stereo recordings of four Herbert operettas were made by Reader's Digest for their 1963 album Treasury of Great Operettas. Each of the operettas in the set is condensed to fill one LP side. The four operettas in this set are Babes in Toyland, Mlle. Modiste, The Red Mill and Naughty Marietta. The Naughty Marietta selections have been re-released on CD.
- Hero and Leander; Grofé: Grand Canyon Suite, Pittsburgh Symphony Orchestra, conducted by Lorin Maazel. (1994) Sony SK52491
- Columbus Suite / Irish Rhapsody, Slovak Radio Symphony Orchestra conducted by Keith Brion (2000) Naxos 8.559027
- Victor Herbert: The Collection, Victor Herbert And His Orchestra (2007) Syracuse University Recordings, SUR 1018. These are remastered transfers from Herbert's 1909–11 Edison cylinders.

== Bibliography ==
- American Society of Composers, Authors and Publishers. Victor Herbert. A bibliography of his recordings, compositions, operettas, instrumental, choral and other works. New York, 1959.
- Herbert, Victor (1927). Victor Herbert Song Album (Vol. 1 ed.). New York: M. Witmark & Sons. OCLC 8022756.
- Herbert, Victor (1938). Victor Herbert Song Album (Vol. 2 ed.). New York: M. Witmark & Sons. OCLC 38229555.
- Herbert, Victor (1976). The Music of Victor Herbert. New York: Warner Bros. Publications. OCLC 3551867.

== See also ==
- List of compositions by Victor Herbert
- Walter Van Brunt
- Lisa Roma, soprano and music educator, debuted with Herbert in 1920
