= Elizabeth F. Ellet =

American writer, poet and translator (1818–1877)

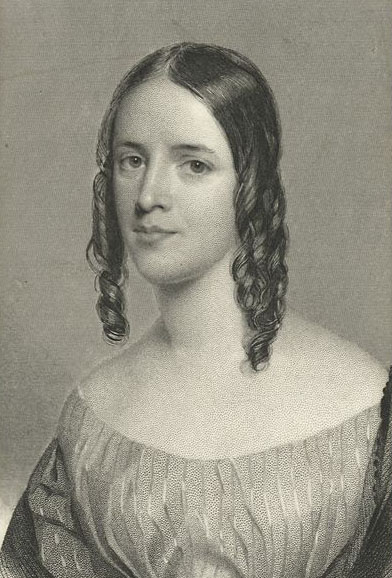
- Born: Elizabeth Fries Lummis; October 18, 1818; Sodus Point, New York, U.S.
- Died: June 3, 1877 (aged 58); New York City, U.S.
- Occupations: Author, historian, poet, translator
- Spouse(s): William Henry Ellet (1806–1859)
- Parent(s): William Nixon Lummis (1775–1833); Sarah Maxwell (1780–1849)

Elizabeth Fries Ellet (née Lummis; October 18, 1818 – June 3, 1877) was an American writer, historian and poet. She was the first writer to record the lives of women who contributed to the American Revolutionary War.

Born Elizabeth Fries Lummis, in New York, she published her first book, Poems, Translated and Original, in 1835. She married the chemist William Henry Ellet and the couple moved to South Carolina. She had published several books and contributed to multiple journals. In 1845, she moved back to New York and took her place in the literary scene there.

She was involved with a public scandal involving Edgar Allan Poe and Frances Sargent Osgood and, later, another involving Rufus Wilmot Griswold. Ellet's most important work, The Women of the American Revolution, was published in 1845. The three volume book profiled the lives of patriotic women in the early history of the United States. She continued writing until her death in 1877.

== Early life ==
Elizabeth Fries Lummis was born in Sodus Point, New York, on October 18, 1818. Her mother was Sarah Maxwell (1780–1849), the daughter of American Revolutionary War captain John Maxwell. During the Revolution, Maxwell was lieutenant of the first company raised in Sussex County, New Jersey. He was promoted to captain and attached to the Second Regiment Hunterdon County Militia. He was also a captain in Colonel Spencer's regiment of the Continental Army from February 7, 1777, to April 11, 1778. He later joined the army of General George Washington as captain of a company of 100 volunteers known as Maxwell's Company.

Her father was William Nixon Lummis (1775–1833), a prominent physician who studied medicine in Philadelphia under the famous Dr. Benjamin Rush. In the early part of 1800, Dr. Lummis left Philadelphia and purchased the Pulteney estate in Sodus Point, Wayne County, New York. Elizabeth Lummis attended Aurora Female Seminary in Aurora, New York, where she studied, among other subjects, French, German and Italian. Her first published work, at age 16, was a translation of Silvio Pellico's Euphemio of Messina.

== Career ==
In 1835, Elizabeth Lummis published her first book, entitled Poems, Translated and Original, which included her tragedy, Teresa Contarini, based on the history of Venice, that was successfully performed in New York and other cities. Around this time she married William Henry Ellet (1806–1859), a chemist from New York City. The couple moved to Columbia, South Carolina, when he was made professor of chemistry, mineralogy and geology at South Carolina College in 1836.

During this time, Ellet published several books. In 1839, she wrote The Characters of Schiller, a critical essay on the writer Friedrich Schiller including her translation of many of his poems. She wrote Scenes in the Life of Joanna of Sicily, a history of the lifestyles of female nobility, and Rambles about the Country, a lively description of the scenery she had observed in her travels through the United States, in 1840. She continued writing poems, translations and essays on European literature which she contributed to the American Monthly, the North American Review, the Southern Literary Messenger, the Southern Quarterly Review and other periodicals. Ellet wrote abundantly in a wide variety of genres.

In 1845, Ellet left her husband in the south, moving back to New York City where she resumed her place as a member of literary society along with such writers as Margaret Fuller, Anne Lynch Botta, Edgar Allan Poe, Rufus Wilmot Griswold, Anna Cora Mowatt and Frances Sargent Osgood.

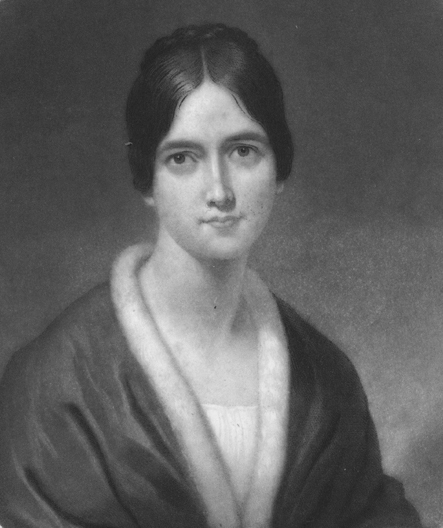
Ellet became involved in a scandal involving Edgar Allan Poe and Frances Sargent Osgood (shown) in the mid-1840s.

=== Scandal ===
During this time, Ellet was a participant in a notorious scandal involving Edgar Allan Poe and Frances Sargent Osgood, both of whom were married to others. Accounts of the particulars of the scandal and the sequence of events differ. At the time, Poe was at the height of his fame, thanks to his work "The Raven". A number of women in literary society sent him letters, including Ellet and Osgood. Some of the letters sent may have been flirtatious or amorous ones. Ellet also spent time with Poe discussing literary matters. It is possible that Ellet felt herself in competition with Osgood for Poe's affections. During this time, Poe had written several poems to and about Osgood, including "A Valentine".

On one visit to Poe's home in January 1846, Ellet allegedly observed letters from Osgood, shown to her by Poe's wife Virginia, and subsequently advised Osgood to ask for their return, implying to Osgood that they were an indiscretion. On behalf of Osgood, Margaret Fuller and Anne Lynch Botta asked Poe to return the letters. Poe, angered by their interference, suggested that Ellet had better "look after her own letters". One such letter, written in German, asked Poe to "call for it at her residence this evening", a phrase presumably meant to be seductive, though Poe either ignored it or did not understand its meaning. He then gathered up these letters from Ellet and left them at her house. Despite her letters having been returned, Ellet asked her brother "to demand of me the letters". Her brother, Colonel William Lummis, did not believe that Poe had already returned them and threatened to kill him. In order to defend himself, Poe requested a pistol from Thomas Dunn English, who did not believe that Ellet ever sent Poe any letters.

Osgood's husband, Samuel Stillman Osgood, threatened to sue Ellet unless she formally apologized. She retracted her statements in a letter to Osgood saying, "The letter shown me by Mrs Poe must have been a forgery created by Poe himself". She put all the blame on Poe, suggesting the incident was because Poe was "intemperate and subject to acts of lunacy". The rumor that Poe was insane was spread by Ellet and by other enemies of Poe and eventually reported in newspapers. After Osgood reunited with her husband, the scandal died down. Poe's sick wife Virginia, however, was deeply affected by the scandal. As early as July 1845 she had been receiving anonymous letters, possibly from Ellet, which reported her husband's alleged indiscretions. On her deathbed, Virginia claimed "Mrs. E. had been her murderer". As Poe described years later, "I scorned Mrs. E simply because she revolted me, and to this day she has never ceased her anonymous persecutions". It is believed that Poe wrote the short story "Hop-Frog" as a literary revenge on Ellet and others.

=== The Women of the American Revolution ===
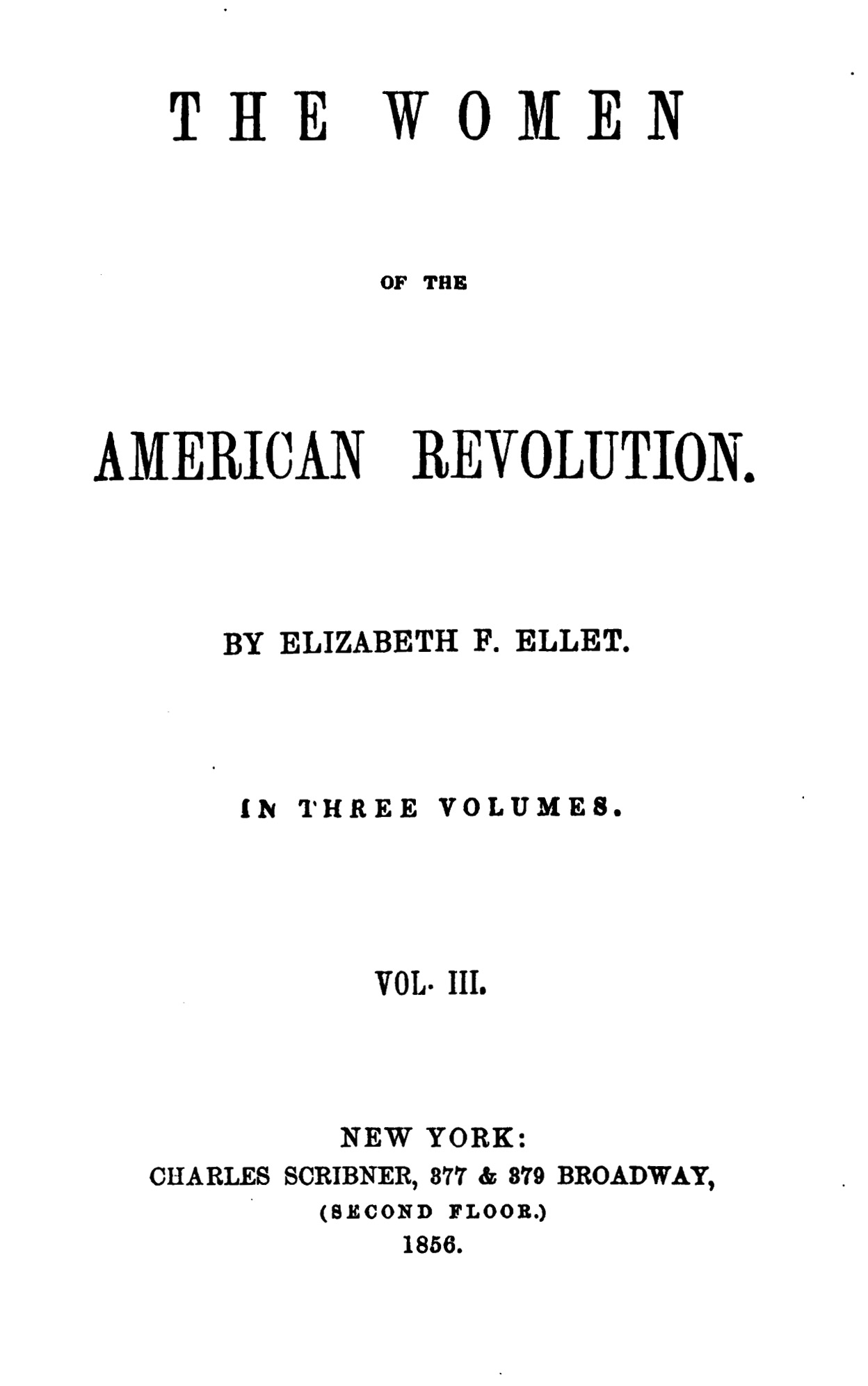
Frontispiece of The Women of the American Revolution (1856 edition)

Around 1846, Ellet began a major project in historical writing: to profile the life stories of women who sacrificed for, and were committed to, the American Revolution. She did this by searching out unpublished letters and diaries, and by interviewing descendants of Revolutionary era and frontier women, becoming the first historian of the Revolution to carry out such an effort. She noted the "abundance of materials for the [masculine] history of action" and attempted to add balance by telling the feminine side, referring to the founding "mothers" as giving "nurture in the domestic sanctuary of that love of civil liberty which afterwards kindled into a flame and shed light on the world".

She found so much information about female patriots that the first edition of The Women of the American Revolution (1848) had to be published in two volumes. These volumes were well received, and a third volume of additional material was published in 1850. Later historians consider these volumes to represent her most important work.

Ellet told the stories of women from every colony and from all ranks of society, with the exception of African Americans, whose role she chose to ignore. Some of the women she wrote about, such as Martha Washington, Abigail Adams, Mercy Otis Warren and Ann Eliza Bleecker, among others, were famous in their own right. She also wrote of the women who were more obscure but equally valuable: the wives of heroes who, during the American Revolutionary War, raised children and defended their homes. She wrote, "It is almost impossible now to appreciate the vast influence of woman's patriotism upon the destinies of the infant republic".

Anthologist and critic Rufus Wilmot Griswold had aided Ellet in the production of the book and granted her access to the records of the New-York Historical Society, of which he was a member. She did not acknowledge his assistance, angering the vindictive Griswold. In a review, Griswold said, "with the assistance of a few gentlemen more familiar than herself with our public and domestic experience, she has made a valuable and interesting work".

=== Further work ===
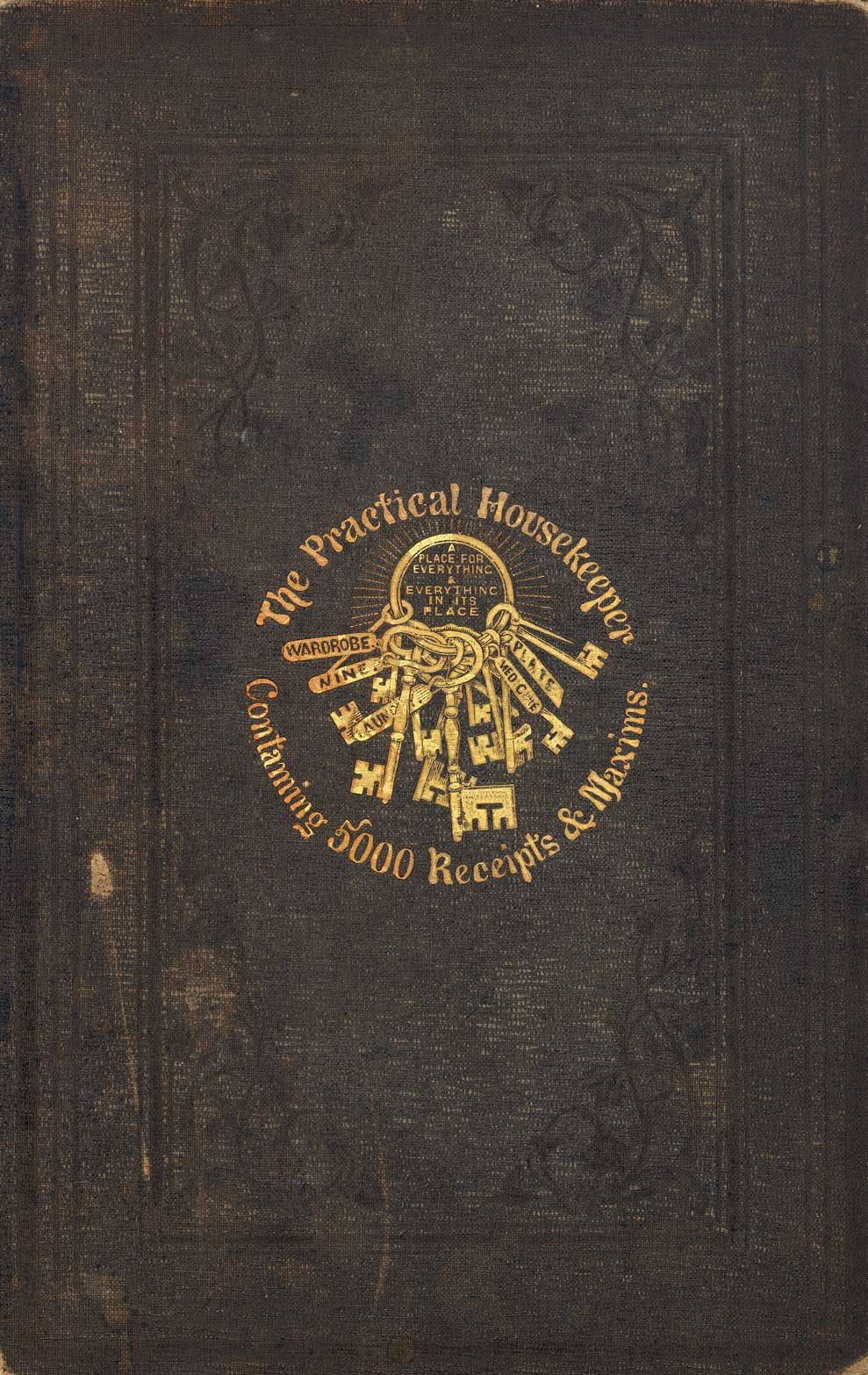
Cover of The Practical Housekeeper (1857)

Now an established and respected author, Ellet went on to write Family Pictures from the Bible in 1849. In 1850 she wrote Evenings at Woodlawn, a collection of German legends and traditions, and Domestic History of the American Revolution, possibly the only history of the American Revolution told from the perspective of both men and women. From 1851 to 1857 she wrote Watching Spirits, Pioneer Women of the West, Novelettes of the Musicians and Summer Rambles in the West. This book was inspired by a boating trip along the Minnesota River in 1852. The local town, Eden Prairie, Minnesota, got its name from Ellet and has dedicated a nature trail in her honor.

In 1857, Ellet published a 600-page encyclopedia of American home economics entitled The Practical Housekeeper. The guide, which seemed to target middle to upper class readers, was organized into three parts: cooking, housekeeping and pharmaceutical concerns. Its contents included thousands of recipes and advice with references to philosophers, scientists, and ancient civilizations. There were also five hundred wood-engraved illustrations. She wrote in the preface, "No complete system of Domestic Economy, within the limits of a convenient manual, has been published in this country".

Later works included Women Artists in All Ages and Countries (1859), the first book of its kind to represent a history of women artists. She wroteThe Queens of American Society (1867), and Court Circles of the Republic (1869), a look at the social life of eighteen presidents from George Washington to Ulysses S. Grant.

== Later years ==
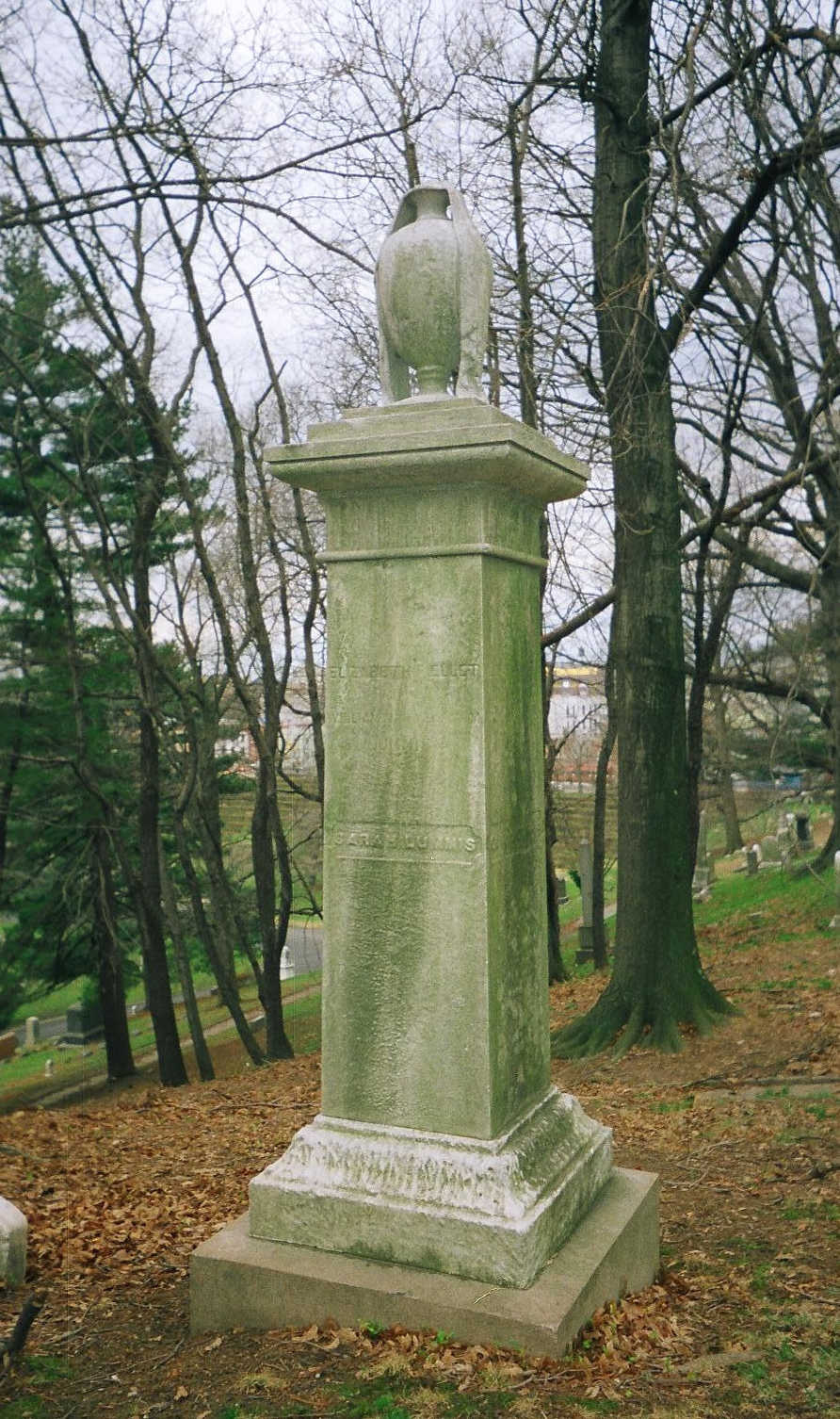
Grave of Elizabeth Ellet in Green-Wood Cemetery, Brooklyn

Ellet became involved with the divorce case between Rufus Griswold and his second wife, Charlotte Myers, in 1852. Ellet and Ann S. Stephens wrote to Myers telling her not to allow the divorce, as well as to Harriet McCrillis, who intended to marry Griswold after the divorce, to end her relationship with him. After it was granted, Ellet and Stephens continued writing to Myers and persuaded her to repeal the divorce on September 23, 1853. On February 24, 1856, the appeal went to court, with Ellet and Stephens providing lengthy testimony against Griswold's character. Neither Griswold nor Myers attended and the appeal was dismissed. When Griswold died in 1857, Sarah Anna Lewis, a friend and writer, suggested that Ellet had worsened Griswold's illness and that she "goaded Griswold to his death".

In 1857, Ellet replaced Ann Stephens as literary editor of the New York Evening Express. Ellet's husband died two years later in 1859. She continued to write, and, although they had no children, she promoted charities for impoverished women and children by speaking in public to raise funds. An Episcopalian most of her life, she converted to Catholicism in her later years. She died of Bright's disease in New York City on June 3, 1877, and was buried beside her husband at Green-Wood Cemetery in Brooklyn.

== Legacy ==
Ellet was the first historian to write about the relationship of women to the American Revolution. She felt that women shaped history by their influence, which was done through "sentiment" and "feeling". This was so hard to define that she stated "History can do it no Justice".

== List of works ==
List of works taken from MSU Historic American project.

- Euphemio of Messina (1834) a translation
- Poems, Translated and Original including the play Teresa Conarini (1835)
- The Characters of Schiller (1839)
- Joanna of Sicily (1840)
- Rambles about the Country (1840)
- The Women of the American Revolution (1848–50) (3 volumes)
- Evenings at Woodlawn (1849)
- Family Pictures from the Bible (1849)
- Domestic History of the American Revolution (1850)
- Watching Spirits (1851)
- Nouvelettes of the Musicians (1851)
- Pioneer Women of the West (1852)
- Summer Rambles in the West (1853),
- The Practical Housekeeper (1857)
- Women Artists in All Ages and Countries (1859)
- The Queens of American Society (1867)
- Court Circles of the Republic (1869)
