= Jenny Twitchell Kempton =

American opera singer (1835-1921)

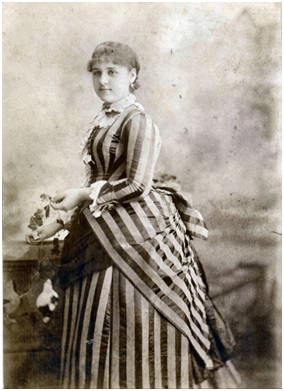
- Jenny Twitchell Kempton, 1860
- Born: Jane Elizabeth Twitchell; October 4, 1835; Dublin, New Hampshire, U.S.
- Died: March 13, 1921 (aged 85); Los Angeles, California
- Occupations: Contralto; Voice teacher
- Years active: 1850–1921

Jane Elizabeth Kempton (née Twitchell; October 4, 1835 – March 13, 1921) was an American contralto opera solo singer who had an active career spanning over fifty years starting in 1850. She sang in hundreds of performances across the United States and Europe during her long career.

== Early life and career ==
Jane Elizabeth Twitchell, nicknamed "Jenny", was born in Dublin, New Hampshire, in 1835, the oldest of three children born to Reuben Wilder Twitchell (1810–1895) and Hanna Prentice Wight (1815–1842).

Her father was a cabinetmaker and musician who volunteered for service in the regimental band of the First Regiment Massachusetts Volunteer Infantry in the American Civil War from 1861 to 1862, and again from 1863 to 1865 as a musician in the 2nd Regiment Massachusetts Volunteer Infantry of the XII Corps then the regimental bandleader of the XX Corps of the Union Army. Reuben Wilder Twitchell was the bandleader for General William Tecumseh Sherman and his March to the Sea in 1864. Jenny's brother, John Wight Twitchell (1842–1864), and her father-in-law, Ezra A. Kempton Jr. (1808–1864), died within one week of each other in Andersonville Prison in August 1864, mere miles from her father and Sherman's Union Army.

Jenny Twitchell Kempton came to notice at a very young age as her untrained vocal range extended from a low C to high C without strain. She came to Boston from Bath, Maine, for a voice education at the age of 14 and soon thereafter sang contralto performances for the Handel and Haydn Society in Boston. Her first notice came from her lead in the first performance in the United States of the Mendelssohn oratorios St. Paul and Elijah in Boston in early 1850 with the Handel and Haydn Society.

In the 1850s she performed solos in and around Boston, including performances with the Sacred Music Society of Portland, Maine. Kempton sang often in the First Parish Church in Cambridge, Massachusetts and entertained in the houses of church members including James Russell Lowell, John Greenleaf Whittier, Francis H. Underwood, Oliver Wendell Holmes Sr., Ralph Waldo Emerson, and Henry Wadsworth Longfellow. In particular, she became lifelong friends with Longfellow. By 1855, she was described as "the favorite contralto of Boston".

By 1857, Kempton moved to New York to study under the contralto Elena D'Angri and would perform many concerts. She then engaged for a multi-year contract with Father Kemp's Old Folks Concerts Company from approximately 1858 to 1861, performing lead solo performances in at least 100 concerts, including performances for President James Buchanan and future-President Abraham Lincoln while touring the East Coast and Midwestern United States from 1859 to 1860. The positive reviews and accolades given Kempton during her performances with the Old Folks Concerts caused such jealousy and trouble among the other performers that the very successful traveling company dissolved for a time, with Robert 'Father' Kemp siding with Kempton against the other performers.

== Later life and career ==
On May 1, 1860, she married James Monroe Kempton (1833–1898) in New York; the couple had two children. She performed in 41 concerts in New York between October 1862 and July 1864, performing many times in those years and becoming lifelong friends with the Venezuelan pianist Teresa Carreño. During this time, she began being called "The Favorite American Contralto".

In 1864, Kempton signed a contract with the Richings-Bernard Opera Company and traveled by steamship to San Francisco to sing many solo performances at Maquire's Academy of Music from 1864 to 1865. During this time, she acquired the nickname "San Francisco's Little Adopted", she was elected an honorary member of the San Francisco Fire Department in 1864, and her voice and success were compared to the famous Jenny Lind.

Following her commercial success in San Francisco, Kempton returned to New York for a brief time and then embarked on a two-year stay in Europe from 1865 to 1867 to train under Gioachino Rossini and to perform in many European capitals. Her European debut came at the Carcano Theater in Milan in a performance of Il giuramento. She eventually performed for King Victor Emmanuel II and Margherita of Savoy in Florence, Emperor Napoleon III and Empress Eugenie in Paris, and Queen Victoria in London, with whom she was considered to have a striking resemblance. Under the personal direction of Rossini, she was the first American to perform his Stabat Mater in Paris in 1865. She returned to the United States to continue performing concerts in and around Boston and New York from 1867 to 1877, including performances in 1873 at the World's Peace Jubilee and International Musical Festival in Boston, engagements with the Carl Rosa Opera Company and a sixty night engagement with the Theodore Thomas Orchestra.

In 1878, Kempton moved to Chicago to give voice lessons and continue to perform and by the 1880s she was primarily a voice teacher of operatic singing. She moved to San Francisco by 1899, and then to Los Angeles in 1905, continuing to give voice lessons until her death in 1921. She was a significant supporter of the suffrage movement to secure the right to vote for women, performing benefit concerts from the 1890s until as late as 1910. She was a founding member of the Dominant Music Club of Los Angeles and was given the title "Mother of Music in Southern California".

She died, aged 85, on March 13, 1921, and was interred at the Hollywood Forever Cemetery.
