= Mary E. Hewitt =

American poet & editor (1818–1894)

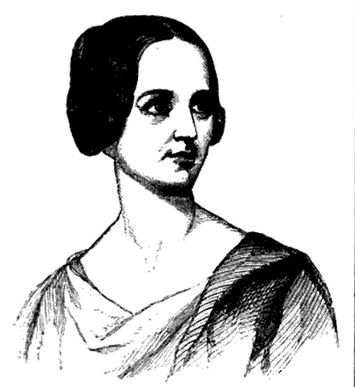
Mary E. Hewitt

Mary Elizabeth Hewitt (later, Mary Elizabeth Stebbins; pen names, Ione and Jane; 1818 – October 9, 1894) was an American poet and editor who flourished in the 1840s and 1850s. She published: Memorial of F. S. Osgood; Songs of Our Lord; Heroines of History; and Poems Sacred, Passionate, and Legendary.

== Early life ==
Mary Elizabeth Hewitt was born in 1818, (Note: The Edgar Allan Poe Society of Baltimore gives Hewitt's date of birth as December 23, 1807.) (Note: Morritt (2011) gives Hewitt's year of birth as 1807.) in Malden, Massachusetts, a country town about five miles from Boston. Her mother, left early a widow, removed to Boston.

== Career ==
Hewitt lived in Boston with her until she married James Lang Hewitt, around 1827. His father was the musician, James Hewitt; his brother was the composer, John Hill Hewitt, and his sister was the musician, Sophia Hewitt Ostinelli. In 1829, the couple removed to city of New York City.

Hewitt's earlier poems appeared in The Knickerbocker, Southern Literary Messenger ("A Bivouac in the Desert", July 1844), and other periodicals, under the signature of "Ione" and "Jane". In 1845, she published a small volume of poems, selected from her contributions to the various periodicals, entitled, Songs of our Land, and other Poems.

This volume confirmed the high opinions which had been formed of her abilities from the fugitive pieces that had been popularly attributed to her. Her compositions in this collection demonstrated that she has a fine and well-cultivated understanding, and they are distinguished in an unusual degree for lyrical power and harmony as well as for sweetness of versification. The verses were evidently the utterance of a warm and impassioned heart, and strong imagination. The thoughts were expressed gracefully and harmomoniously, and bore the stamp of truth and originality.

Hewitt's poem "Harold the Valiant" appeared closely upon the date of Henry Wadsworth Longfellow's "The Skeleton in Armor" (1841), with which it had points of resemblance. In 1850, Hewitt edited a gift book, called The Gem of the Western World; and the Memorial, a tribute to the memory of her friend, Frances Sargent Osgood. In 1854, she married Russell Stebbins.

Among the later productions of Hewitt were some elegant translations, which illustrated her taste and learning, and a fine command of language. Her last work was The Heroines of History (1856).

Samuel Stillman Osgood's Portrait of Mrs. Mary E. Hewitt, (1818- .), oil on canvas, measuring 25 inches by 30 inches, was presented by Hewitt to the New-York Historical Society on April 15, 1861. Painted circa 1850, the artist was the husband of Hewitt's friend Frances Osgood.

She died October 9, 1894. She is buried at Mount Auburn Cemetery, Cambridge, Massachusetts.

== Selected works ==
- The Songs of our Land, and Other Poems (1846)
- The Gem of the Western World (editor, 1850)
- The Memorial: Written by Friends of the Late Mrs. Osgood (editor, 1851)
- Heroines of History (editor, 1852)
- Poems, Sacred, Passionate, and Legendary (1854)
- Lives of Illustrious Women of All Ages (editor, 1860)
