= Carl Zerrahn =

American flautist and conductor (1826–1909)

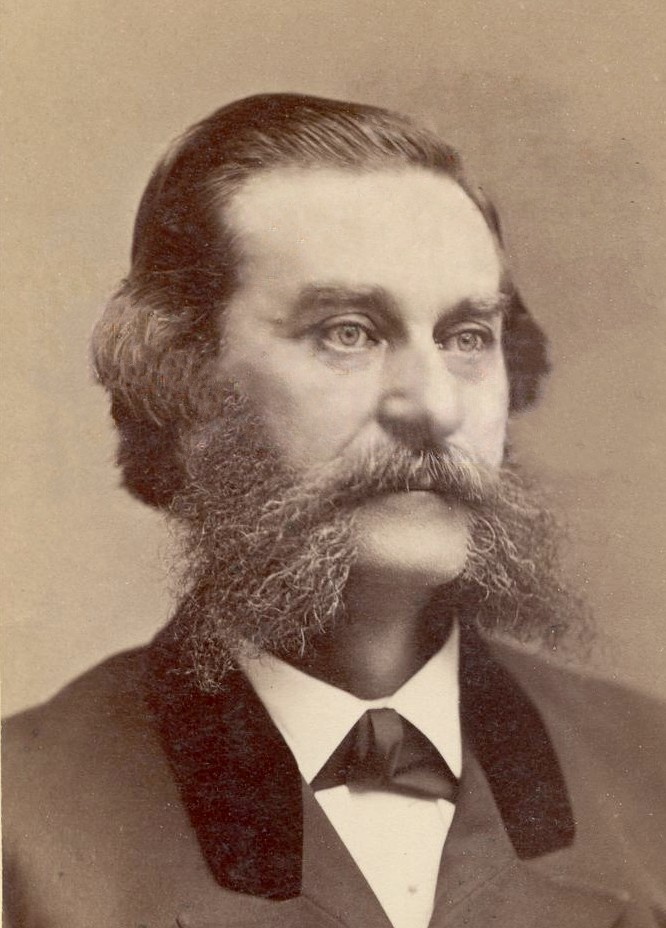
- Born: July 28, 1826
- Died: December 29, 1909 (aged 83)

Carl Zerrahn (28 July 1826 Malchow, Mecklenburg-Schwerin – 29 December 1909 Milton, Massachusetts) was a German-born American flautist and conductor. His widespread activity in the region made him an influential figure in New England and Boston classical music, especially choral music, in the latter half of the 19th century. He was especially successful in the presentation of the great oratorios and the management of large choruses.

== Biography ==
He began the study of music in Rostock at the age of twelve years, and completed his education in Hanover and Berlin. The revolutions of 1848 motivated him to leave Europe, and with 25 others he organized The Germania Musical Society and went to the United States, giving concerts in London on the way. Zerrahn played first flute. The group reached New York City in September 1848 and gave successful concerts in New York and Brooklyn which were followed by others in Philadelphia, Baltimore, Washington, and New England. They appeared for five or six years with Jenny Lind, Henriette Sontag, Ole Bull, Sigismund Thalberg, Alfred Jaëll, Camilla Urso, and other artists, disbanding in 1854 after giving 800 concerts during its career.

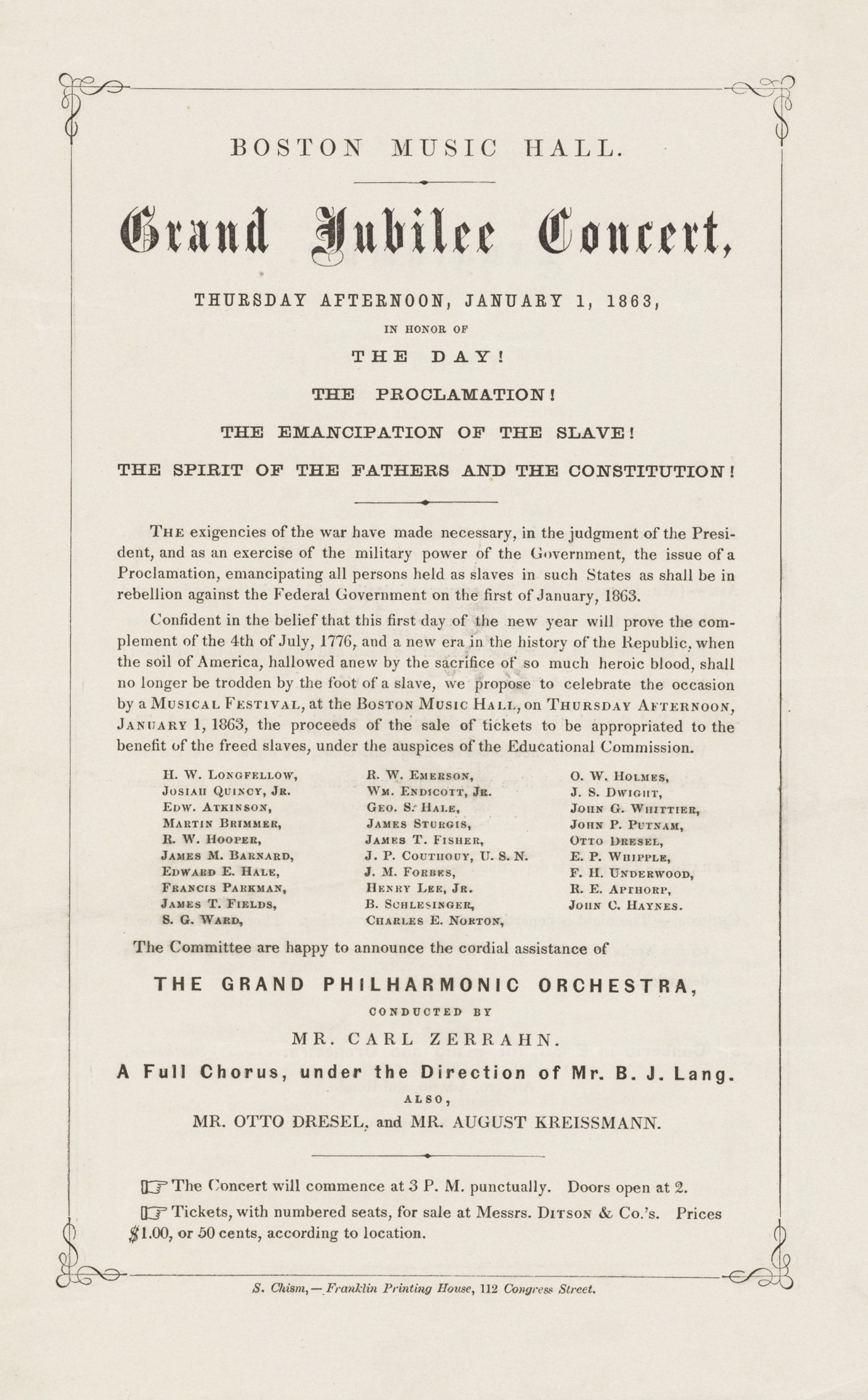
Zerrahn is listed as the conductor of Grand Philharmonic Orchestra for the "Grand Jubilee Concert" in Boston, January 1, 1863.

Zerrahn settled in Boston at the conclusion of the tour. From 1855 until 1863 he conducted a Boston "Philharmonic," one of several orchestras going by that name at that time. Beginning in 1865, he led concerts for the Harvard Musical Association until the concerts were discontinued in 1882. He conducted the Handel and Haydn Society 1854–1895, and he directed the Worcester Music Festival in Massachusetts for thirty years as well, 1866–1897. He was elected conductor of the Oratorio Society of Salem, Massachusetts in 1868, and conducted choral societies in St. Johnsbury, Vermont, Ogdensburg, New York, and other places.

He directed the choral forces for Patrick Gilmore's National Peace Jubilee of 1869 and the World's Peace Jubilee and International Musical Festival of 1872. In 1869, this amounted to a chorus of 10,000; in 1872 the chorus was twice that size though in the latter case the results were not entirely satisfactory. He taught singing, harmony and composition at the New England Conservatory of Music until 1898, when he retired.

Among the journals he edited were The Index, The Apograph, The Atlas, and Carl Zerrahn's Selections.
