= Marie Ravenel de La Coste =

American poet and educator

- Born: 1835; Savannah, Georgia, U.S.
- Died: 1946 (aged 110–111)
- Occupations: Poet; Teacher; Nurse
- Writing career
- Period: American Civil War
- Genre: poetry
- Notable work: Somebody's Darling

Marie Ravenel de La Coste (1835 – 1946) was an American poet and French language teacher. She is known for her poem Somebody's Darling, which she wrote while serving as a Confederate nurse during the American Civil War.

== Biography ==
De la Coste was born in Savannah, Georgia to French parents. She grew up in Savannah and later worked there as a French language teacher.

During the American Civil War, de La Coste's fiancé, who was an officer in the Confederate States Army, was killed. Following his death, she volunteered as a hospital nurse for the remainder of the war.

She penned the poem Somebody's Darling, which was set to music by John Hill Hewitt and published in 1864. Her poem told the story of a nameless, dying soldier carried into a hospital ward.
