= Adele Laeis Baldwin =

American music educator

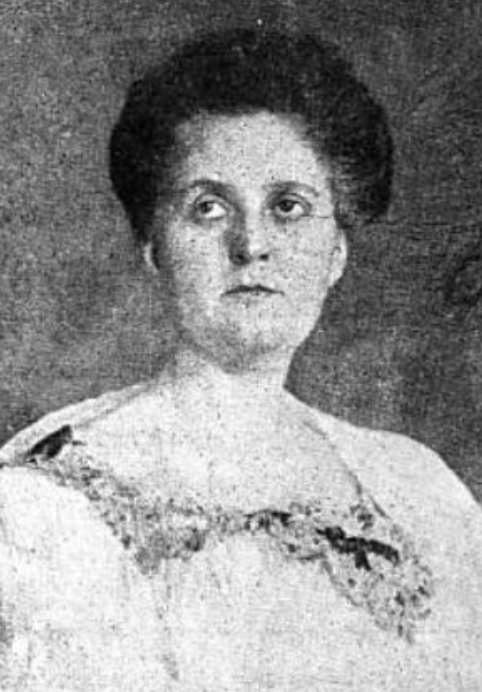
- Adele Laeis Baldwin, from a 1927 publication
- Born: 1864; St. Louis, Missouri, US
- Died: 1927 (aged 62–63)
- Occupations: Composer, singer, voice teacher

Adele Laeis Baldwin (1864 – 1927) was an American composer, contralto singer, and voice and speech teacher at the Institute of Musical Art.

== Early life and education ==
Laeis was born in St. Louis, Missouri, the daughter of Felix Laeis and Theresa Laeis. Her father was a veteran of the American Civil War, born in Holland; her mother was born in Belgium. She studied voice with Achille Errani, Francesco Lamperti, and Anna de la Grange.

== Career ==
Baldwin, a contralto, performed with the New York Oratorio Society under Walter Damrosch, the Handel and Haydn Society, and Frank Damrosch's Musical Art Society choir. She was also a church soloist, and sang at private musicales. "Her spirit and methods are at home in oratorio, and the larger arias were delivered by her with infinite sympathy and taste," noted on 1897 review. "Her diction deserves commendation, being unusually clear, impressive and refined." In 1906, she another singer gave an impromptu concert while touring a hospital in Pennsylvania.

Baldwin taught vocal technique in New York City, at her own studio in Carnegie Hall, and at the private Finch School. She was on the faculty of the Institute of Musical Art, precursor to the Juilliard School. She was an authorized teacher of the Yersin method of French elocution, devised by Marie and Jeanne Yersin. She was president of the National Association of Teachers of Singing. She served as treasurer and director of the Musical Blue Book Corporation.

== Publications ==
- Laeis-Baldwin method of the production of speech-sounds (1916)
- Laeis-Baldwin method of practical phonetics for singers and speakers (1923)

== Personal life ==
Laeis married Theodore Frelinghuysen Baldwin in 1887. She died in 1927, in her sixties.
