= Handel and Haydn Society =

American chorus and orchestra based in Boston (1815–present)

Background information
- Genres: American chorus and period instrument orchestra
- Years active: 1815–present
- Website: www.handelandhaydn.org

The Handel and Haydn Society is an American chorus and period instrument orchestra based in Boston, Massachusetts. Known colloquially as 'H+H', the organization has been in continual performance since its founding in 1815, the longest serving such performing arts organization in the United States.

== Early history ==
The Handel and Haydn Society was founded as an oratorio society in Boston on March 24, 1815, by a group of Boston merchants and musicians, "to promote the love of good music and a better performance of it". The founders, Gottlieb Graupner, Thomas Smith Webb, Amasa Winchester, and Matthew S. Parker, described their aims as "cultivating and improving a correct taste in the performance of Sacred Music, and also to introduce into more general practice, the works of Handel, Haydn, and other eminent composers." The society made its debut on Christmas Day, December 25, 1815, at King's Chapel (then Stone Chapel), with a chorus of 90 men and 10 women. The early chorus members were middle-class tradesmen drawn from the choirs of local churches. Only men could be members, while a far smaller number of women were invited to participate. In its early decades the society hired what musicians it could afford and used unpaid amateurs to complete the orchestra or sometimes substituted organ for orchestra.

Jonas Chickering, at the start of his career as a piano manufacturer, joined the society in 1818 at age 20 and later became its president. The society was also an early promoter of composer Lowell Mason, publishing his first collection of hymns in 1822 and later electing him as the group's president. Profits from the sales of that hymnbook and a second collection of sacred music subsidized the society for several decades.

The Handel and Haydn Society has given a number of notable American premieres, including Handel's Messiah in 1818, and Haydn's The Creation in 1819. The society also sponsored the first American publication of an edition of Messiah in 1816. It presented the U.S. premieres of musical settings by many baroque and classical composers, including Mozart and Bach. An 1818 assessment in the New England Palladium magazine said:

We know there is a fashion in admiration, but the exertions of these gentlemen have continuously presented us with something more and more worthy to be admired. It is doubtless to them that we must ascribe in great measure the improved taste in Sacred Music that is prevailing among us.

Some early reviews noted that public interest waned after a few years as many standard works were repeated. John Rowe Parker wrote in the Euterpeiad:

There have been many instances where a deficiency of patronage has been manifested ... and it cannot be too evident that this deficiency, was more owing to the deficiencies in genius and in practice, than in any unwillingness on the part of the public, to award the meed of excellence.

The society's principal chronicler believes that repeating repertoire was necessary to support "much rehearsing until the inexperienced singers could master that which special enthusiasm had carried through in rough outline." Membership from the start and well into the 20th century was limited to men, though the chorus, which was first dominated by male voices, was soon roughly balanced between male and female.

About 1823, several of the society's members commissioned Beethoven to compose an oratorio, apparently with an English text, which he never completed.

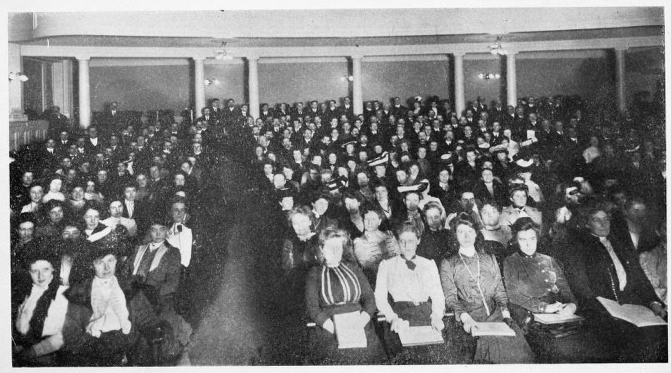
Chorus rehearsal, 1903

From its earliest years, Handel and Haydn participated in music festivals and civic celebrations to commemorate significant historical events. For the visit of President James Monroe in 1817, the H+H orchestra performed a march composed for the occasion by their concertmaster, followed by almost two dozen arias and choruses. In 1826, H+H joined the services in Faneuil Hall marking the deaths of President Adams and Jefferson. In 1830 it helped mark the 200th anniversary of the founding of Boston, and it gave a concert in 1833 to help raise funds for the completion of the Bunker Hill Monument. President John Tyler attended an 1843 concert, and the society helped commemorate the death of Daniel Webster in 1852. That same year it participated in the opening of the Boston Music Hall, which later became the first home of the Boston Symphony Orchestra. The next year it presented the Boston Premiere of Beethoven's Ninth Symphony. Its 600-member chorus participated in Boston's memorial service for Abraham Lincoln, singing "Mourn, ye afflicted people" from Handel's Judas Maccabaeus and "Cast thy burden upon the Lord" from Mendelssohn's Elijah. It marked the centennial of Beethoven's birth by performing selections from his Ninth Symphony in 1870. When Boston paid tribute to Admiral George Dewey upon his return from the Spanish–American War in 1899, 280 H+H singers greeted his arrival at City Hall with "See the Conquering Hero Comes" from Judas Maccabaeus. It performed for Grand Duke Alexis of Russia and Queen Elizabeth II. In addition, the society held benefit concerts for the Union Army, victims of the Chicago fire of 1871, and Russian Jewish refugees displaced by the 1882 May Laws.

The society occasionally favored a composer whose modern reputation has not matched his nineteenth-century popularity. In the 1830s, the society presented David, an oratorio by Haydn's pupil Sigismund von Neukomm, 55 times. By the 1850s, H+H had hundreds of members, but fewer than half participated as the society presented repeat performances of a small number of classic oratorios varied only by a sampling of church anthems. Rossini's Moses in Egypt was performed 25 times in the course of two seasons in the mid-1840s. In 1852, the society upgraded the quality of its orchestral support by hiring the Germania Orchestra, a band of European immigrant musicians with their own conductor, a group far better trained than the musicians hired until then who had found Mendelssohn's works very challenging.

The society joined in celebrations marking the effective date of the Emancipation Proclamation on January 1, 1863. The society marked its golden jubilee in May 1865 with a five-day festival of nine concerts employing a chorus of 700. It included the first H+H performance with full orchestra of Mendelssohn's Hymn of Praise. Five more such festivals using more modest forces followed at three-year intervals. Years of preparation led to the first all-but-complete H+H performance of Bach's St. Matthew Passion on May 8, 1874.

One noteworthy member of the society's chorus in the middle of the 19th century was Julia Ward Howe, composer of "The Battle Hymn of the Republic".

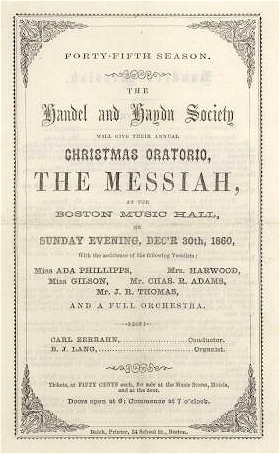
Annual Christmas oratorio, the Messiah, at the Boston Music Hall, on Sunday evening, December 30, 1860

The society has performed Handel's Messiah annually since 1854. It gave the first United States performances of Verdi's Requiem in 1878, just four years after its world premiere, and of Handel's Joshua on Easter Sunday 1876. The first works by American composers appeared in the society's 1874 programs: St. Peter by John Knowles Paine and the Forty-sixth Psalm by Dudley Buck. In 1892, the society presented the premiere of the Mass in E flat by Amy Beach, a youthful work by the first important female American composer. Critics condemned the H+H performance of the Berlioz Te Deum in 1888 as the work of "a musical crank".

As the society considered works outside the traditional religious oratorio tradition, such as Saint-Saens' Samson and Delilah, it surveyed local religious leaders to determine if they would object to such performances on Sunday evenings. Some did not object to the music or subject matter, but to conducting a commercial enterprise on the Sabbath. In a few instances, the music was modified for Sunday performances, as when the drinking song was dropped from Haydn's The Creation.

The society participated in some of the mass concerts and festivals that followed the end of the American Civil War, at first reluctantly. Invited to participate in Boston's National Peace Jubilee that assembled more than 10,000 voices, H+H was, according to the event's organizer, "the very first invited, yet they were among the very last−the one hundred and second society−to accept." In 1870 the society joined in a New York City celebration, with members of the orchestra and 546 chorus members taking overnight boats to perform excerpts from Elijah. When H+H traveled to perform the complete Elijah and other works in New York City and Brooklyn in 1873, a special train carried the performers, including approximately 400 singers.

To mark the arrival of the twentieth century, 200 members of the H+H chorus participated in a midnight ceremony at the Massachusetts State House on December 31, 1899, leading the singing of "Old One Hundredth" and "America". (Note: The first day of the 20th Century was January 1, 1901, the Society erroneously ringing in the new century (as undoubtedly many others did) a year ahead of time.) The society performed for the first time in Boston's Symphony Hall on October 21, 1900. In the new century, as musical tastes changed and other professional groups competed for the same audience, H+H reduced its performances to four annually and avoided innovative repertoire choices. Occasionally a concert took on the flavor of a "pops concert", with sentimental vocal solos including Arthur Sullivan's "The Lost Chord", even as the society's president lamented how the public was distracted from concert-going "in these days of radio and victrolas."

The society struggled during the financial crisis of the 1930s, experimenting unsuccessfully with evenings of Wagner excerpts. A better strategy arranged for concerts to be sponsored by local charities, such as the League of Catholic Women, Boston University, and Faulkner Hospital, all of which underwrote ticket sales. World War II created personnel problems and the number of choristers fell to 206 active members, its lowest point in a hundred years. Yet the society ambitiously planned its first performance of Brahms' A German Requiem for April 29, 1945, and dedicated it to President Roosevelt who died on April 12. It released its first commercial recording, Handel's Messiah, in 1955, made its television debut in 1961, and in December 1963 presented the world's first televised performance of Messiah.

H+H marked its 150th anniversary in March 1965 with the premiere of Randall Thompson's The Passion According to St. Luke, which it commissioned for the occasion.

== Historically informed performance ==
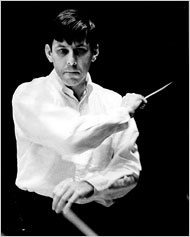
Thomas Dunn, 1979

Toward the middle of the 20th century, the Handel and Haydn Society began adopting the practices of the "historically informed performance" movement, striving for vocal and instrumental "authenticity". This came in response to a 1965 review in the Boston Globe by Michael Steinberg, who criticized the group's failure to demonstrate any awareness of the revolution in performance practice already under way in larger music centers. He later described the variables at issue: "Decisions about tempo, articulation, vocal embellishment (long felt to be sacrilegious and unthinkable), weight and color of sonority, all contributed to this process." Writing in 2005, he included Thomas Dunn in a list of seven "conductors who most powerfully effected this re-examination."

In 1967, Dunn, an expert in baroque performance practice, became the society's artistic director and transformed its large amateur chorus into a smaller professional musical ensemble. In 1963, Time magazine had called Dunn "the hero of the baroqueniks". Under Dunn in 1977, H+H made the first recording of Alfred Mann's 1963 edition of Messiah, the only recording at the time in which the soloists joined in singing the choruses, following the practice of Handel's time. Dunn nevertheless performed an extensive repertory that extended to Stravinsky and contemporary composers. By the time he retired H&H was something of an anomaly, an ensemble that adopted historical performance practices for older music but played exclusively modern instruments.

Christopher Hogwood succeeded Dunn in 1986, and under his direction the society's orchestra began using period instruments in their performances. The society has since remained committed to historically informed performance practice.

== Recent history ==
With Hogwood, the society made its first appearance outside of the United States at the 1996 Edinburgh Festival. H+H also presented a number of programs that linked the baroque tradition of improvisation to that of such contemporary jazz artists as Chick Corea and Gary Burton.

Grant Llewellyn was music director from 2001 through 2006 and held the title of principal conductor for three seasons through 2009. During his tenure, the society produced several commercial recordings, including Peace and All is Bright, and received its first Grammy Award for a collaboration with the San Francisco choral ensemble Chanticleer for the 2003 recording of Sir John Tavener's Lamentations and Praises.

The society also entered into a multi-year partnership with Chinese director Chen Shi-Zheng starting in 2003, which resulted in fully staged productions of Monteverdi's Vespers (in 2003) and Orfeo (in 2006) that Chen saw as the beginning of a cycle of Monteverdi's surviving operas and his Vespers. The 2006 Orfeo was co-produced by the English National Opera. Chen also directed a production of Purcell's Dido and Aeneas in 2005 for Handel and Haydn. In July 2007, the ensemble made its debut at the London Proms under Sir Roger Norrington.

Harry Christophers first conducted the Handel and Haydn Society in September 2006 at the Esterházy Palace at the Haydn Festival in Eisenstadt, Austria, the society's first appearance on the European continent. He returned to the society for further guest-conducting appearances in December 2007 and January 2008. In September 2008, the society announced the appointment of Christophers as its artistic director, effective with the 2009–10 season, with an initial contract of three years. In September 2011, the society extended Christophers' contract for another four years, through the 2015–16 season. In January 2019, the society announced that Christophers is to conclude his tenure as its artistic director at the close of the 2020–21 season. In the wake of the COVID-19 pandemic, Christophers formally concluded his tenure as artistic director in May 2022, and now has the title of conductor laureate with H+H.

Since 2011, each concert season has featured masterworks the society premiered in the United States. In February 2011, it presented Handel's Israel in Egypt, the American premiere of which it gave on February 13, 1859. In March and April 2012, the society performed Bach's St. Matthew Passion. The society gave the complete American premiere of Bach's masterpiece in 1879. The group gave several concerts in California in the spring of 2013 and ended its 2012–13 season with Handel's Jephtha, a dramatic oratorio given its American premiere by H+H in 1867.

In February 2020, Jonathan Cohen first guest-conducted H+H. Cohen returned for additional guest appearances in April 2022 and October 2022. In November 2022, H+H announced the appointment of Cohen as its next artistic director, effective with the 2023–2024 season, with an initial contract of 5 years.

== Artistic leadership ==
Prior to 1847, conducting duties fell nominally to the president of the society. However, the keyboardist or first violin in the orchestra did most of the actual conducting. As the society's ambitions grew, it became increasingly clear that it needed more established musical leadership. Over the years, the name of the title has changed several times, from "Conductor" to later titles of "Artistic Director" and "Music Director".

- Charles E. Horn, 1847–1849
- J.E. Goodson, 1851–1852
- Carl Bergmann, 1852–1854
- Carl Zerrahn, 1854–1895 and 1897–1898
- B.J. Lang, 1895–1897
- Reinhold L. Herman, 1898–1899 (Note: Herman (b. Germany, 1849 or 1853) trained in Europe, lived in New York 1871-78, returned to Germany and then to New York again, where he taught music at Union Theological Seminary, before returning to Germany and establishing a reputation as a composer.)
- Emil Mollenhauer, 1900–1927
- Thompson Stone, 1927–1959 (Note: "In 1945, Thompson Stone (1883–1972) assumed the chair as the second Austin Fletcher Professor of Music [at Tufts University]. Stone was the conductor of Boston's venerable Handel and Haydn Society and a guest conductor of the Boston Pops.")
- Edward F. Gilday, 1959–1967
- Thomas Dunn, 1967–1986
- Christopher Hogwood, 1986–2001
- Grant Llewellyn, 2001–2006
- Harry Christophers, 2009–2022
- Jonathan Cohen, 2023–Present

== Educational outreach ==
The Handel and Haydn Society's Karen S. and George D. Levy Educational Outreach Program provides music education to children in communities throughout eastern Massachusetts with several components:

- The Vocal Apprenticeship Program (VAP) provides in-depth training for talented young singers in grades 3–12. It was established in 1994 to identify and nurture youngsters with special talent whose families lack the financial resources to pursue private instruction.
- The Vocal Quartet visits schools with original presentations developed to teach music history in an entertaining, age appropriate way.
- Collaborative Youth Concerts bring singers from different high schools together to perform in their home communities alongside Handel and Haydn Society musicians.

The society selects the winner of its annual Candace MacMillen Achtmeyer Award, which extends the society's support to an outstanding senior who has participated for at least two years in the Vocal Apprenticeship Program (High School Soloists, Young Men's Chorus, Young Women's Chorus). (Note: The award was named in the memory of Candace MacMillen Achtmeyer in 2001. A member of the Handel and Haydn Society Board starting in 1993, she was a member of the Education Committee, where she voiced passionate opinions about the society's responsibility to the community and children in particular.)

The Barbara E. Maze Award for Musical Excellence extends the society's support to an outstanding VAP alumnus with a cash award of $2,000 given to a high school graduate who intends to continue professional vocal instruction. The award is named in honor of Handel and Haydn Society Governor Barbara E. Maze, who was instrumental in creating VAP. Ms. Maze was chair of the society's Cultural Diversity Committee, and a member of the Handel and Haydn Educational Outreach Committee. She was a retired assistant dean of student affairs for Boston University. Maze was the national chairperson for the Leontyne Price Vocal Arts Competition, and President of Project STEP.

== Notable members and performers ==
- Adele Laeis Baldwin, contralto
- Thomas Ball, singer
- Carl Bergmann, cellist
- Eliza Biscaccianti, organist
- Phoebe Carrai, cellist
- Bertha Cushing Child, singer
- Cassandra Extavour, singer
- Emi Ferguson, flutist
- James Gilchrist, tenor
- Jenny Twitchell Kempton, contralto
- William McColl, clarinetist
- Harrison Millard, alto
- Ossian Everett Mills, tenor
- Sophia Hewitt Ostinelli, organist
- Ronald Thomas, cellist

== Sources ==
- Michael Broyles, "Music of the Highest Class": Elitism and Populism in Antebellum Boston (Yale University Press, 1992)
- H. Earle Johnson, First Performances in America to 1900: Works with Orchestra (Detroit: College Music Society, 1979)
- H. Earle Johnson, Hallelujah, Amen!: The Story of the Handel and Haydn Society of Boston (Boston: B. Humphries, 1965)
- H. Earle Johnson, Musical Interludes in Boston, 1795-1830 (NY: Columbia University Press, 1943)
- Teresa M. Neff, "In the Public Eye: the Handel and Haydn Society and Music Reviews, 1840-1860". Symposium sponsored by the American Literature Association: "Musical Intelligence in Antebellum Boston", June 25, 2017
- Teresa M. Neff and Jan Swafford, eds., The Handel and Haydn Society: Bringing Music to Life for 200 Years (Jaffrey, NH: David R. Godine, 2014)
