= Old Folks Concerts =

Form of musical and visual entertainment

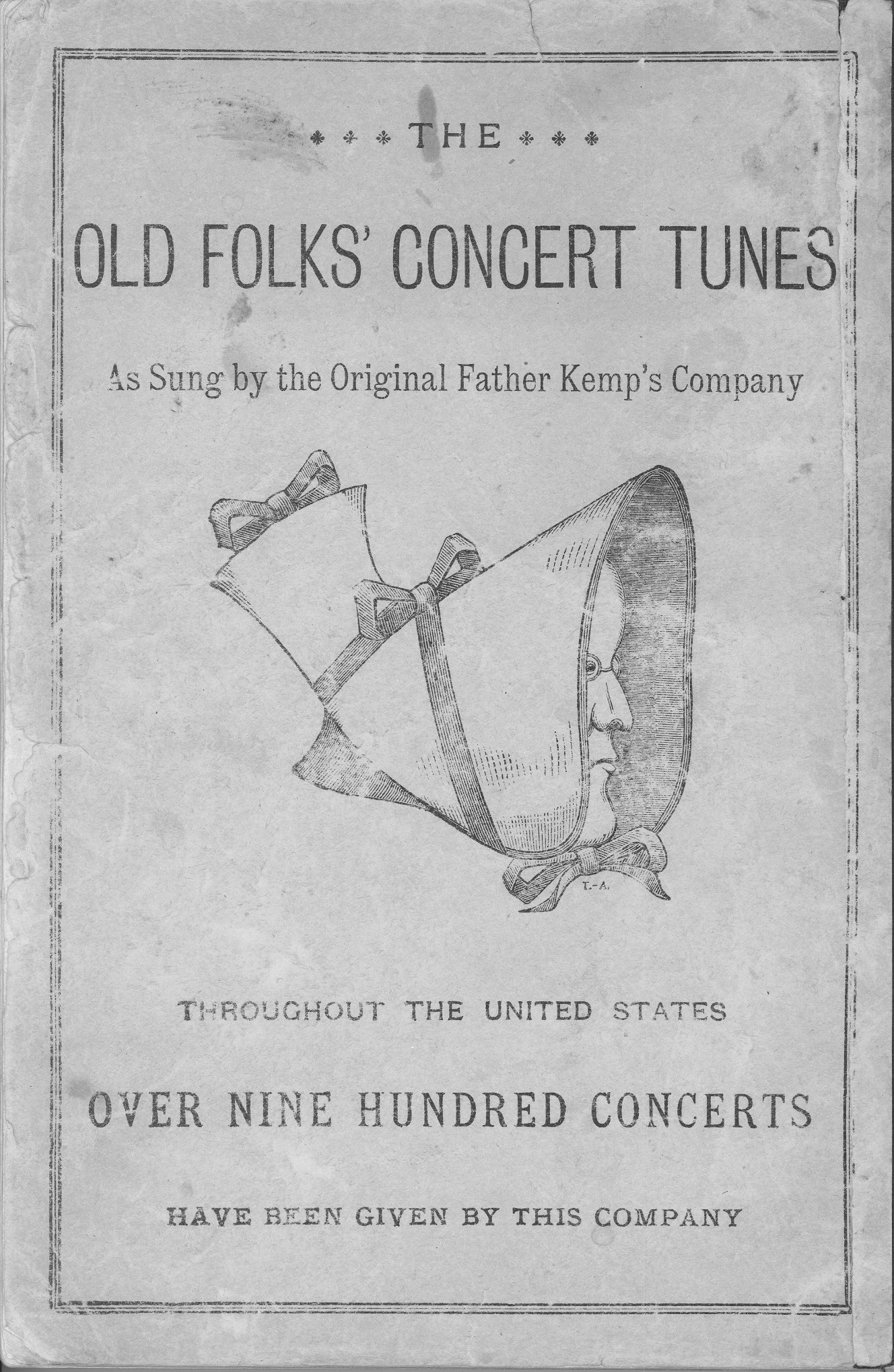
Father Kemp's Old Folks' Concert Music, 1889 edition. Notice the old-fashioned dress of the woman, a hallmark of the Old Folks Concert.

An Old Folks Concert was a form of musical and visual entertainment at which early American compositions by such composers as William Billings and Daniel Read were sung in period costume, while demonstrating early singing school methods. Old Folks Concerts began in the early 1850s in New England, spread in popularity throughout the United States by the 1860s, and continued to be performed into the 20th century. They are especially associated with Robert "Father" Kemp, who formed a traveling troupe to perform this music, and who published a collection of music known as Father Kemp's Old Folks' Concert Music.

Singing schools developed in Northeastern United States in the late 18th century, and became a popular way for people to learn to sing, and for composers to share, the religious and patriotic music being written and notated using the new system of "patent notes" and taught using solfege. According to Willard (2007), the singing school movement spread west and south, but with the rise of the "Better Music Movement," the singing schools went largely out of use in New England by the 1830s.

According to Steinberg (1973), though, some in New England missed the "good old tunes," giving rise to the Old Folks Concert which "revived the music and antiquated performance practices of the singing schools (p 602)." What apparently began as an informal and amateur activity in the early 1850s became a popular form of entertainment under the leadership of Robert "Father" Kemp by the mid and late 1850s, whose professional troupe toured the United States and even England with featured soloist Jenny Twitchell Kempton. Beale (1997) quotes a writer (writing in 1959) for the Cincinnati Enquirer to indicate the reasons for the popularity of the Old Folks Concert:

Their music is of that kind which touches the heart and appeals to the sympathies of every one. It calls to mind early associations long since buried in the "dead past," and revives the pleasantest recollections of the spring-time of existence, when "life was full of sunny years," and our hearts free from the "mountains of care" which weigh them down in after years.

The Old Folks Concerts were an exercise in nostalgia. In addition to singing the old tunes, nostalgia was enhanced by the appearance of the singers in period costumes and advertisements written in the style of early American typography. In addition to professional troupes, Old Folks Concerts were often arranged by amateur groups for fund-raising. For example, in 1872, the Diocese of Missouri's annual convention notes that "by the generous efforts of some warm hearted friends [such as] those antiquated ladies, who, in spite of the infirmities of age, came forth and at our request to assist us with an Old Folks' Concert, we have been enabled recently to reduce the accumulated debt under which [the diocesan-supported St. Luke's] Hospital has been struggling."

Father Kemp retired in 1868, but other troupes, according to Steinberg (1973), continued the Old Folks Concert tradition. As time went on, the language affectations of the concert posters and presenters become more pronounced, and the clothing all the more quaint, the music less religious. Like the minstrel show, says Steinberg (1973), the Old Folks Concerts began to lampoon an inaccessible rural past.
