= National Peace Jubilee =

Coordinates: 42°20′59.19″N 71°4′35.68″W

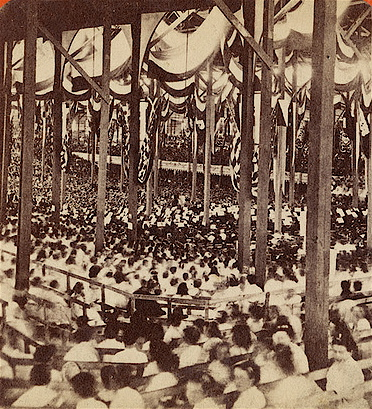
Peace Jubilee, Boston, 1869

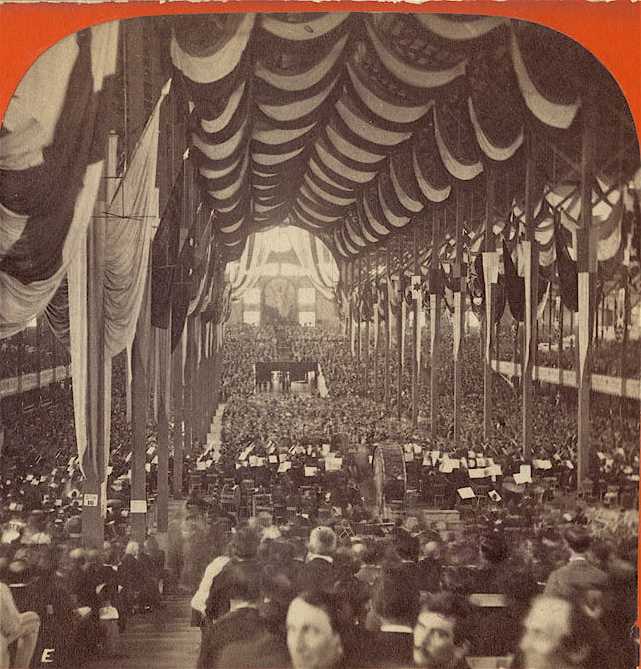
Peace Jubilee, Boston, 1869

The National Peace Jubilee was a celebration that commemorated the end of the American Civil War, organized by Patrick Gilmore in Boston from June 15–19, 1869. It featured an orchestra and a chorus, as well as numerous soloists. More than 11,000 performers participated, including the famous violinist Ole Bull as the orchestra's concertmaster, and Carl Zerrahn as director of the choral forces. The Jubilee became the "high-water mark in the influence of the band in American life". Along with the World's Peace Jubilee and International Musical Festival in 1872, it made Gilmore a famous composer and bandmaster. For the Jubilee, a newly commissioned "Hymn of Peace" was written by Dr. Oliver Wendell Holmes, set to the music from "American Hymn" by Matthias Keller (1813-1875) and performed on the opening day.

Participants included:

- 100 choral groups with a total of 10,926 singers
- 525 musicians with the orchestra
- 486 musicians with the wind band

== See also ==
- Handel and Haydn Society
