= James Hewitt (musician) =

American conductor, composer and publisher

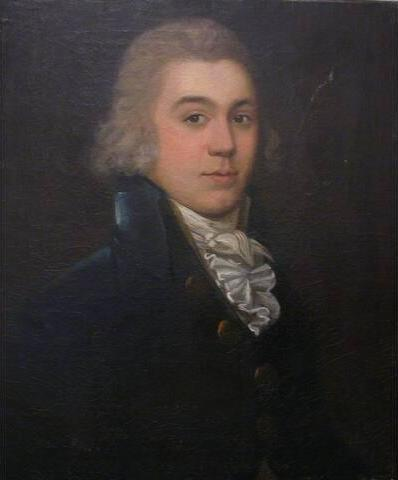
- portrait attributed to John Hoppner
- Born: June 4, 1770; Dartmoor
- Died: August 2, 1827 (aged 57); Boston
- Occupation: Composer, conductor, publisher
- Children: John Hill Hewitt, Sophia Hewitt Ostinelli, James Lang Hewitt, George Washington Hewitt

James Hewitt (June 4, 1770 – August 2, 1827) was an American conductor, composer, and music publisher. Born in Dartmoor, England, he was known to have lived in London in 1791 and early 1792, but went to New York City in September of that year. He stayed in New York until 1811, conducting a theater orchestra and composing and arranging music for local ballad operas and musical events. He also gave lessons and sold musical instruments and publications in his "musical repository".

He began participating in the musical activities of Boston as early as 1805, and moved there in 1811, pursuing the same activities as he had done in New York. For the rest of his life he traveled between the two cities. After an unsuccessful operation in New York in early 1827, he was brought back to Boston, where he died a few months later. His place of burial is not known. Most of his publications were the works of British composers, including William Shield, James Hook and even Haydn and Mozart. He also published about 160 of his own works, including instrumental, keyboard, and vocal compositions. Like other American music teachers of the same era, he also produced several pedagogical books.

One of his most well-known works today is The Battle of Trenton, a keyboard sonata written in 1797 and dedicated to George Washington. This sonata contains numerous short sections with descriptive titles, such as "The Army in Motion," "Attack—Cannons—Bomb," "Flight of the Hessians," "Trumpets of Victory," and so forth, including one section using the tune "Yankee Doodle." When the harpsichordist Ralph Kirkpatrick revived the piece in 1940, Time magazine commented that "Though written for the most part in the measured, tinkling idiom of 18th-Century English salon music, The Battle of Trenton still preserved a smoldering crash and rumble reminiscent of the early works of Ludwig van Beethoven." The piece has been arranged for band and can be heard as performed by the Goldman Band on the album "Footlifters - A Century of American Marches." It was also recorded by organist E. Power Biggs, who narrated his own performance.

Hewitt was especially influential in musical life of New York in the early nineteenth century. Four of his children became prominent musicians: his son John Hill Hewitt (1801–1890) was an important composer, his daughter Sophia Henrietta Emma Hewitt (1799–1845) was a well known concert pianist, his son James Lang Hewitt (1803–53) was a successful music publisher (married to the poet, Mary E. Hewitt), and another son George Washington Hewitt (1811–93) taught and composed music. His niece was soprano Eliza Biscaccianti.
