= John Hill Hewitt =

American composer, playwright and poet

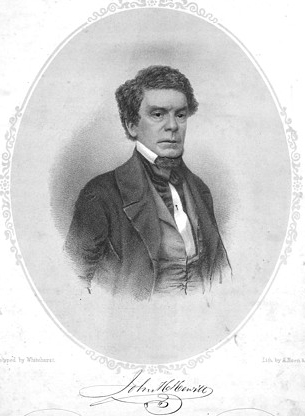
An 1852 illustration of Hewitt

John Hill Hewitt (July 11, 1801, New York City – October 7, 1890, Baltimore) was an American composer, playwright, and poet. He is best known for his songs about the American South, including "A Minstrel's Return from the War", "The Soldier's Farewell", "The Stonewall Quickstep", and "Somebody's Darling". His output during the American Civil War earned him the epithets "Bard of the Stars and Bars" and "Bard of the Confederacy".

Over his career, Hewitt wrote over 300 songs, a number of cantatas and operettas, and one oratorio, as well as plays, poems, and articles for magazines and newspapers. He also worked as a theatre manager, magazine and newspaper editor, concert performer, and music teacher at seminaries for women.

== Early life and career ==
Hewitt was born in New York City, into a musical family. His father, James Hewitt, was an influential music publisher, composer, and musician; his sister, Sophia Hewitt Ostinelli, would eventually become a renowned pianist. His brother, James Lang Hewitt, eventually took over his father's publishing operations; James was married to the poet Mary E. Hewitt. His niece was soprano Eliza Biscaccianti.

Nevertheless, Hewitt's father tried to steer his son away from the music business, apprenticing him in a number of other fields. In 1818, Hewitt entered West Point. His grades were bad overall, but the school provided his first formal musical training. By 1822, Hewitt did not have the grades to graduate, and his military career ended when he challenged a school officer to a duel.

== Hewitt in the South ==
Hewitt moved to Augusta, Georgia, in 1823 to join his father's theatrical troupe. Their theatre burned down soon after his arrival, but Hewitt decided to stay in Augusta and open a music store where he could give private lessons for flute and piano. He became enamored of the South and its genteel traditions, and he enjoyed the attention paid to him by the wealthy parents of his pupils. However, Hewitt grew disillusioned as he realized that his dinner invitations came because his hosts wanted live music, not his company.

Still, Hewitt took a permanent teaching position at the Baptist Female Academy in Greenville, South Carolina, in 1824, tutoring on the side. When a rival intimated that Hewitt was in fact a mulatto, Hewitt's private students quit him. He eventually had John C. Calhoun write a letter attesting to the allegation's falsity.

== Bard of the Confederacy ==
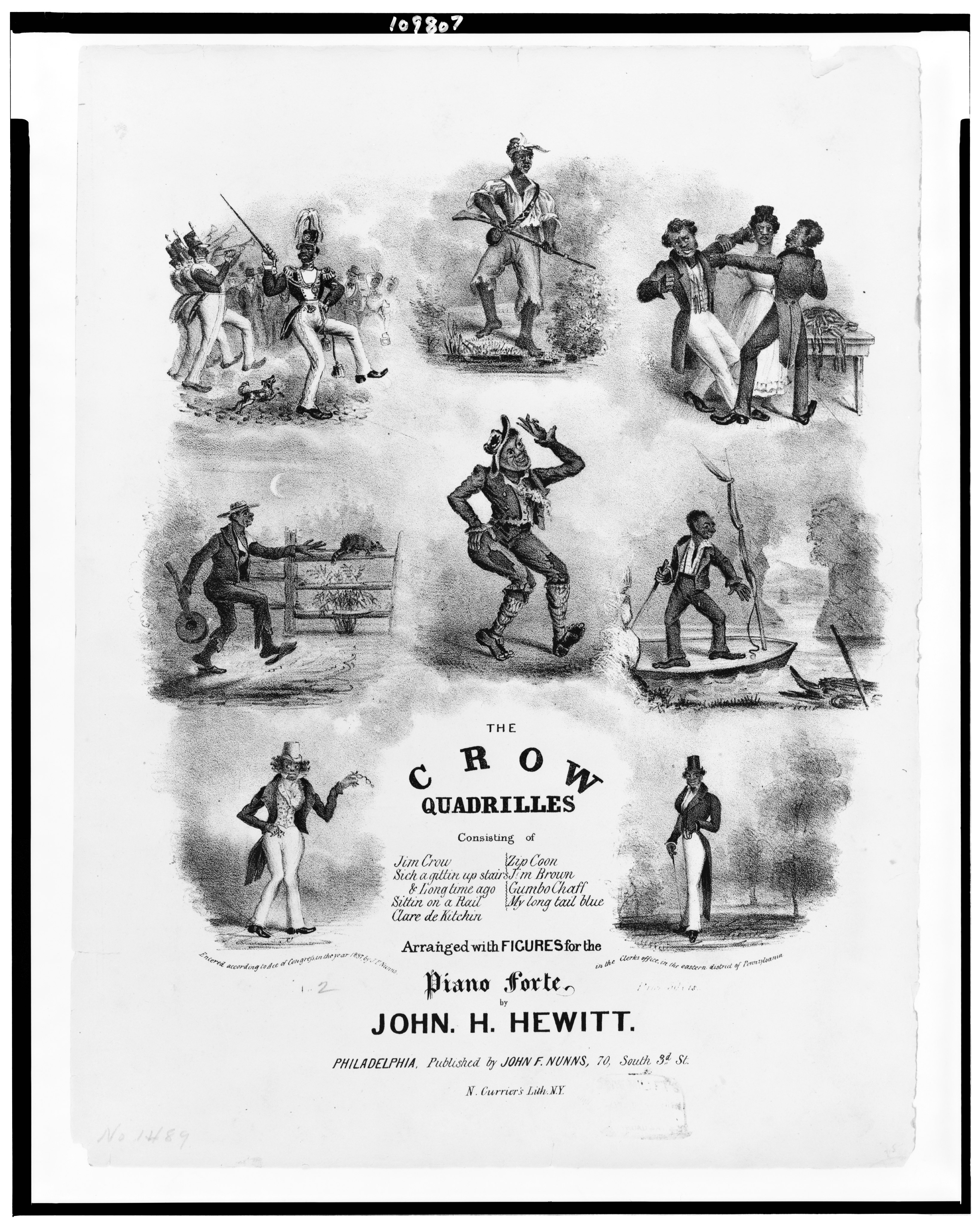
The Crow Quadrilles by John Hill Hewitt

In 1825, Hewitt wrote The Minstrel's Return from the War and published it through his brother in Boston. The song eventually became a success internationally, making him the first American-born composer whose fame reached both sides of the Atlantic. He married Estelle Mangin in 1827. In 1833 Hewitt was editor of the Baltimore Saturday Visiter. His composition "Garde Vous" was written for the 1838 operetta The Prisoner of Rochelle. By 1840, Hewitt was pursuing writing as a profession. That year, he moved to Washington, D.C., to start and edit a newspaper. In 1844, when yodeling had become fashionable in entertainment, he wrote "The Alpine Horn." Over the next few years, he moved again and again, eventually ending up in Hampton, Virginia. There he took a position at the Chesapeake Female College and remained for nine years. His wife died during this tenure.

By the start of the American Civil War, Hewitt had moved to Richmond, Virginia. He attempted to join the Confederate States Army, giving his background at West Point for credentials. He was already 60 years old, however, and the army would only offer him a drillmaster position. Hewitt turned it down. Instead, he took a job in November 1861 as the manager of the Richmond Theatre. During his stint there, he staged many of his own works, but in less than two years, the theatre owners grew tired of his authoritarian management practices. Hewitt was replaced by R. D'Orsey Ogden.

He moved back to Augusta, where he joined Alfred Waldron to write pieces for the theatre and for the Queen Sisters, including the ballad operas King Linkum the First and The Vivandiere. He also began tutoring in private again, and he married an 18-year-old pupil named Mary Smith in 1863. With her he would father four more children, for a total of 11.

In 1863 and 1864, Hewitt traveled with the Queen Sisters as a songwriter. They popularized his song "All Quiet Along the Potomac Tonight", which became such a hit that his publisher went through five printings of the sheet music. His poetry, music, and drama grew increasingly pro-Southern and pro-Confederate. He published through John Schreiner beginning in 1864 but sent pieces secretly to the Blackmars under the pen name "Eugene Raymond". His Jephtha in 1846 may have been the first oratorio written by an American. Hewitt's output earned him the epithets "Bard of the Stars and Bars" and "Father of the American Ballad". In 1864, he set music to the poem Somebody's Darling by Savannah poet and French teacher Marie Ravenel de La Coste.

Hewitt eventually bought the Augusta-based Blackmar publishers, but the business failed after the war. Hewitt returned to Virginia to teach at the Wesleyan Female Institute in Staunton and at the Dunbar Female Institute in Winchester. He bounced back and forth between Maryland and Georgia for the next few years, eventually ending up in Baltimore, where he remained until his death on October 7, 1890.
