= Sophia Hewitt Ostinelli =

American classical musician (1799–1845)

- Born: Sophia Henreitte Emma Hewitt; May 23, 1799; New York City. New York
- Died: August 31, 1845 (aged 46); Portland, Maine
- Occupations: Concert pianist and organist
- Spouse(s): Paul Louis Ostinelli, violinist and conductor
- Children: Eliza (Ostinelli) Biscaccianti (1824-1896)
- Parent(s): James Hewitt (1770-1827) and Eliza (King) Hewitt (1779-1867)

Sophia Hewitt Ostinelli (1799-1845) was an American classical musician who was a child prodigy who later became the only woman ever employed as an organist and accompanist by the Handel and Haydn Society in Boston, Massachusetts. She also became the second musician ever to perform the music of Beethoven in Boston.

== Formative years ==
Sophia Henriette Hewitt was born in New York County, New York on May 23, 1799, to James Hewitt (1770-1827), a native of England who became a respected composer, conductor and music publisher in the United States, and Eliza (King) Hewett (1779-1867), a Paris-educated author who was a daughter of a British Army officer. Sophia was baptized by the Rev. Benjamin Moore on June 14 1799, at New York City's Trinity Episcopal Church.

She studied music with her father from the time she was a very young child and performed a piano sonata before an audience at the City Hotel in New York on April 14, 1807, at the age of seven at a concert planned and promoted by her father. She performed again in New York in February and April 1808. She played a piano sonata by Ignaz Pleyel in Boston, Massachusetts on October 2, 1810.

Around 1812, Hewitt and her siblings relocated with their parents to Boston, where her father had accepted positions as the Federal Street Theatre's music manager and as organist for Trinity Church.

Following her 1814 performance of The Storm, a piano concerto by Daniel Steibelt, the music publication Repertory noted: "It is far beyond our ability to do her ample justice ... the spontaneous bursts of applause which followed are the best tribute of praise. We never witnessed a performance on the Piano Forte which could compare with it."

After a brief sojourn in New York circa 1815 to 1817, during which she performed as a concert pianist for the Euterpian Society and vocalist for New York Oratorios and studied piano with a Mr. Morgan, the harp with a Mr. Ferrand and the organ with George K. Jackson while also providing music instruction for students at a boarding school operated by a Mrs. Brenton, she returned to Boston. On August 28, 1817, she played piano in concert as part of a trio and as a soloist, performing works by Pleyel and Henri Joseph Taskin. In addition, she sang at least one of her father's compositions, "Rest Thee, Babe". Later that year, she performed with the Handel and Haydn Society in New York City, and performed three more times in New York in 1818.

== Professional musician ==
Also in 1818, leaders of Boston's Handel and Haydn Society recruited Hewitt to be the society's organist and accompanist. Initially declining the position, she accepted two years later and held the post for a decade. Hewitt was "the only woman they ever employed in this capacity, before or since". She was paid between $50 and $62.50 per quarter during her tenure with the society. During this same time, Sophia Hewitt also took on the role of organist for Boston's Catholic Cathedral and Chauncy Place Church.

She also continued to perform in recitals and in concert in Boston, including with that city's Philharmonic Society throughout the late 1810s and early 1820s. On February 27, 1819, she became the second musician ever to perform the music of Beethoven in Boston when she played his Piano Sonata in A-flat, op. 26. (Note: The first person to play Beethoven's music in Boston – the violinist Paul Louis Ostinelli – later married Hewitt. Both also performed in concert in Boston on April 13, 1820. Posting advertisements in the April 1 and 8 editions of the music publication Euterpiad, she increased the number of students taking harp, piano and voice lessons from her.)

== Family life and later career ==
On August 25, 1822, Hewitt wed Paul Louis Ostinelli in Boston. A graduate of the Paris Conservatory, he was a second violinist with the Handel and Haydn Society in Boston in 1817 and made his debut as a solo violinist in 1818. He also became the first musician to perform the music of Beethoven in Boston.

Hewitt and her husband performed in recitals and concerts across New England, including at a concert dedication of the new organ at the First Parish Church of Portland, Maine. In 1823, she helped the South Parish Church in Augusta, Maine, debut its new English organ.

In 1824, she gave birth to a daughter, Eliza.

Hewitt performed at another concert for the Handel and Haydn Society in Boston on April 20, 1828. By 1830, however, at least one member of the society criticized her playing and judged her music education inferior to the organization's new standards. As a result, she was removed from her position as the society's organist and accompanist. Despite this setback, she continued to operate her own musical academy in Boston, teaching harp, piano and voice to her students; she also continued to perform in concerts and recitals in and beyond Boston, participating in brief tours of Maine and Canada.

By 1833, she had separated from her husband. She placed an advertisement in the Eastern Argus offering piano and voice lessons at her residence in Portland.

On August 5, 1834, she appeared in Boston in a benefit for Mr. Walton, her last known performance. She became the organist at the First Parish Church in Portland and taught to support herself and her daughter. In May 1845, the First Parish Church paid her $31.25 as organist.

She died in Portland August 31, 1845, at the age of forty-six. She was laid to rest in Tomb 48, Section A at the Eastern Cemetery in Portland, Cumberland County, Maine.

== Family ==
Hewitt's brother John Hill Hewitt (1801-1890) also had a distinguished career in the arts, becoming a respected American playwright, poet and songwriter while their brothers, James Lang Hewitt (1800-1853) and George Washington Hewitt (1811-1893) became, respectively, a music publisher and a music educator and composer. James was married to the poet, Mary E. Hewitt.

Hewitt's daughter, Eliza, became a singer. A Boston patron provided her with enough money to travel to Europe to pursue her education. She sailed with her father for Naples, Italy, on November 26, 1843, and studied under several well-known teachers. In 1847, a year after her mother's death, she married an Italian cellist, Count Alessandro Biscaccianti.
