= Eliza Biscaccianti =

American actress

Eliza (Ostinelli) Biscaccianti
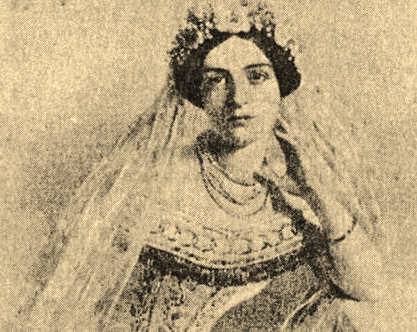
- Born: Eliza Ostinelli; 1824; Boston, Massachusetts
- Died: July 1896 (aged 71–72); Paris, France
- Occupation: Operatic soprano
- Spouse: Count Alessandro Biscaccianti
- Parent(s): Paul Louis Ostinelli, violinist, and Sophia (Hewitt) Ostinelli (1799-1845), concert pianist and organist

Eliza Biscaccianti (1824 – July 1896) was an American operatic soprano from Boston, Massachusetts. Born Eliza Ostinelli, she was the daughter of pianist Sophia Hewitt Ostinelli, the only woman to have ever been employed as an organist and accompanist by Boston's Handel and Haydn Society and the second musician ever to perform the work of Beethoven in Boston, and Louis Ostinelli, a native of Italy who became a second violinist with, and later a conductor of, the Handel and Haydn Society. Her uncle was composer John Hill Hewitt and her grandfather was conductor, composer and music publisher James Hewitt.

She was nicknamed "The American Thrush".

== Musical training, marriage and singing career ==
From 1842 to 1847 Biscaccianti studied singing in Italy, most notably with Giuditta Pasta. She made her professional opera debut at Teatro Lirico in Milan in May 1847 as Elvira in Ernani. While in Italy she married the Italian cellist Count Alessandro Biscaccianti. They returned to the United States in late 1847 when Biscaccianti was offered a contract at the Astor Opera House in New York City. She made her debut at the Astor opera house as Amina in La sonnambula. She was later heard that season in the title role of Lucia di Lammermoor.

After the Astor Place Riot in 1849, she returned to her native city of Boston where she was lauded for her opera performances. She then toured to San Francisco in 1852 where she was one of the star performers in the fledgling opera scene in that city during.

Madame Biscaccianti received from a large and highly intelligent audience, on the occasion of her re-appearance, last evening, one of the most flattering welcomes that we have ever seen bestowed upon a public favorite. It was her first concert in several weeks, and she had barely recovered from an illness which still left its enfeebling effects upon her frame; but her voice was strong, pure and exquisitely flexible, and her spirits buoyant and animated. She sang with a degree of fervor and expression that called for the most enthusiastic testimonials, in the forms of plaudits, "bravos" and bouquets, from a delighted auditory. Her execution, too, was brilliant and artistic; and we see no reason to change the opinion we expressed many months since, after one of the fair Signora's 'Benevolent Concerts'; that the strength and purity of her tones and her brilliancy of style and execution continually increase, and her increasing success is manifest at every concert given by Madam B. in this city.

According to Verdi historian, George Martin:

Because she had been born in Boston of a New England mother, Biscaccianti was known popularly as "The American Thrush," but she had studied in Europe and sung in Paris, Milan, St. Petersburg, and London, founding a claim to be the first American to sing opera in Europe. In the ten months that she remained in California she sang at least seventy recitals, thirty-five in San Francisco, thirteen in Sacramento, seven in Stockton, and the balance in smaller towns.

In 1853 Biscaccianti performed in operas in South America, including in Lima, Peru. After retiring from the stage she taught singing in Milan. In her elder years she lived in a home for artists in Paris that was supported by a foundation in memory of Rossini.

== Death ==
By the time of her death in 1896, according to Ammer, Biscaccianti was impoverished. She died, aged 72, at the Rossini Foundation Home for Musicians in Paris.

== External resources ==
- “Madame Elisa Biscaccianti,” in “Very Important Passengers.” The Maritime Heritage Project: Retrieved online June 14, 2018.
