= Worcester Music Festival (Massachusetts) =

Classical music festival held in Worcester, Massachusetts

- Genre: Classical
- Location: Mechanics Hall (Worcester, Massachusetts)
- Years active: 1858–present
- Founders: Edward Hamilton; Benjamin F. Baker
- Website: www.musicworcester.org

Worcester Music Festival is a classical music festival held in Worcester, Massachusetts, since 1858, and it is claimed to be the oldest music festival in the United States.

== History ==
The inaugural edition in 1858 was a four-day music convention organized by Edward Hamilton and Benjamin F. Baker. In the same year, the Worcester Chorus was founded to sing at the festival, and it continues to perform every year. Although the convention lasted four days, only one concert was held. The Worcester County Musical Convention was formed in 1863, and Carl Zerrahn became its director in 1866. It changed its name to Worcester County Musical Association in 1877, and decided to call the events festivals instead of conventions. Victor Herbert was affiliated with the festival as assistant conductor and soloist for three years starting in 1889. Antonín Dvořák performed at the festival in 1893. Wallace Goodrich was the conductor from 1902 to 1907. Van Cliburn performed in 1958. Arthur Fiedler, Peter Nero, Birgit Nilsson, Itzhak Perlman, Beverly Sills, Roberta Peters, Isaac Stern, Leontyne Price, Anna Moffo, Joan Sutherland, André Watts, Duke Ellington, and André Previn also performed at the festival. The Philadelphia Orchestra was associated with the festival for thirteen years beginning in 1944, and the Detroit Symphony Orchestra was the resident orchestra from 1958 to 1974. In 1976, the festival changed from a week-long series of performances to a season-long series.

In 1996, the Worcester County Music Association merged with the International Artists Series to form Music Worcester, Inc., which has organized the festival since then, incorporating the International Artists Series and the Mass Jazz Festival into the festival.
