= World's Peace Jubilee and International Musical Festival =

1872 music festival

Coordinates: 42°20′47.89″N 71°4′34.17″W

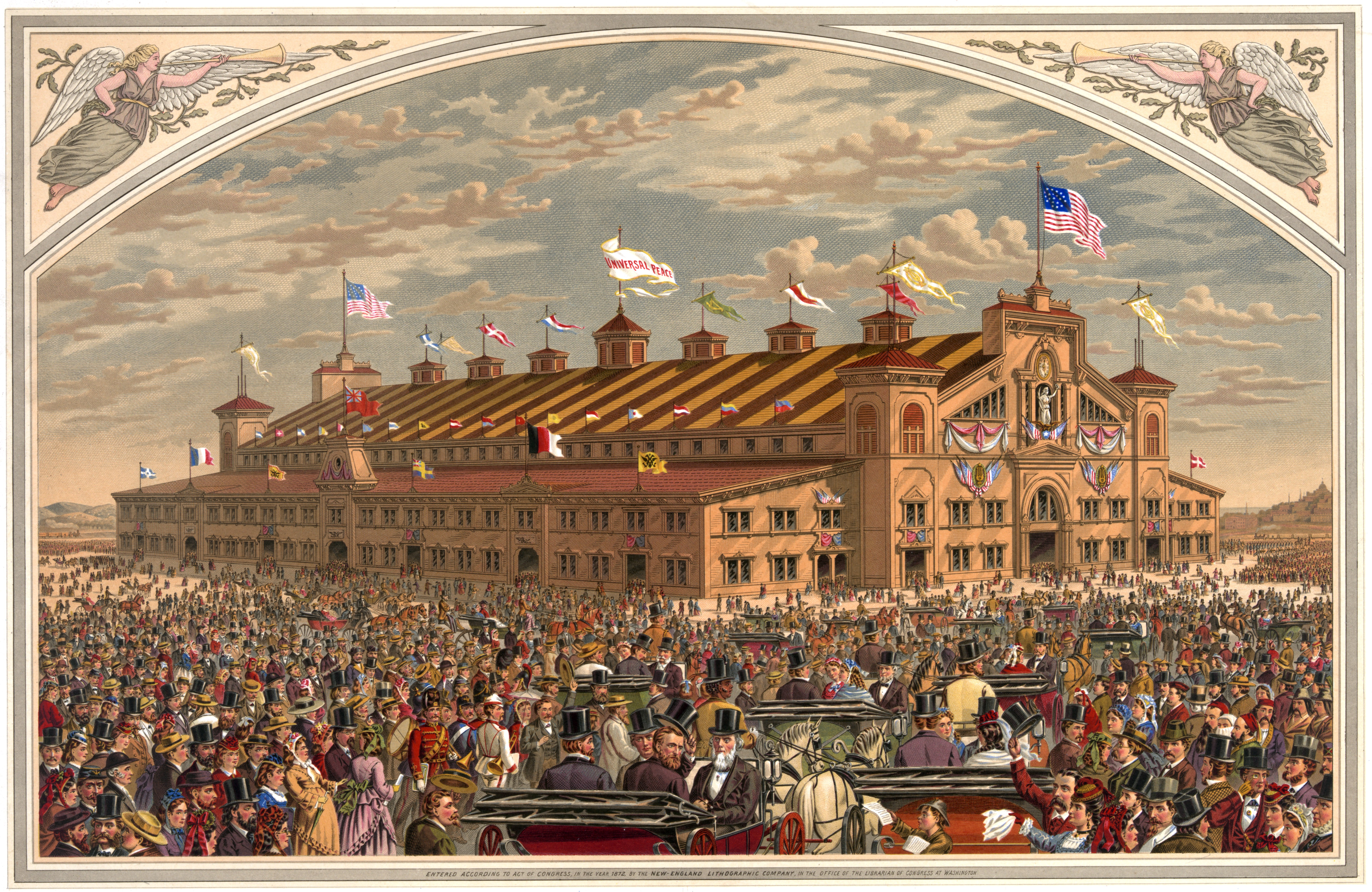
World's Peace Jubilee coliseum, Back Bay, Boston, 1872

The World's Peace Jubilee and International Musical Festival of 1872 took place in the Back Bay area of Boston, Massachusetts. Patrick Sarsfield Gilmore directed the festival, which lasted some 18 days. The jubilee honored the ending of the Franco-Prussian War.

== Brief history ==
For this well-publicized, high-profile, widely anticipated event, architect William G. Preston designed the "colosseum, with a seating capacity of 100,000, ...erected at a cost of half a million dollars." J.H. Wilcox & Co. designed the 43-foot high pipe organ. At opening ceremonies on June 17, 1872, before some 15,000 spectators, Phillips Brooks presented a prayer and Boston mayor William Gaston and Nathaniel Prentice Banks gave speeches. "Unfortunately the size of the building and the din of the workmen caused passages of the prayer and speeches to be inaudible."

Many musicians performed at the jubilee. During the festival "the bands of the Grenadier guards, from London, of the Garde republicaine, from Paris, of the Kaiser Franz regiment, from Berlin, and a band from Dublin, Ireland: with Johann Strauss, the waltz-king, Franz Abt, the German song-writer, and many famous soloists, vocal and instrumental, were among the foreign attractions." One concert featured a "performance of Verdi's Il Trovatore by a 2,000-member orchestra, conducted by Johann Strauss, Jr., and 100 assistants, accompanied by a 20,000-voice chorus." The members of the chorus came "from all parts of the Union," and were directed by Carl Zerrahn. A new piece, titled Festival Hymn: Peace and Music, was composed for this Jubilee by American composer, Dudley Buck. Other works on the program included the "Federal Street" hymn tune by local politician and composer Henry K. Oliver.

The Fisk University Jubilee Singers also gave a concert, the first time African American "singers [were] included in a big musical production" in the country. An original performance by black female players, the Hyers Sisters, was also well-received. Johann Strauss performed on violin: "All eyes were riveted upon the expressive face and the almost eloquent arm of Herr Strauss. Every ear was strained to catch a sound from the violin on which he ever and anon laid the bow with a passion and surety unexcelled. A storm of applause marked the conclusion of the waltz, which was at once re-demanded and heard anew." Other performers included pianist Franz Bendel; vocalist Madame Rudersdorff; the United States Marine Band; Arabella Goddard; and Madame Peschka-Leutner.

The jubilee provided au courant "Press and Telegraph Rooms ...furnished with all desirable accommodations for the members of the press, while the telegraphic facilities are ample for communicating with all parts of the world."

Despite enthusiastic audiences, the festival suffered financially, partly from lower-than-expected attendance, and partly from setbacks during construction of the building. Some attendees responded negatively to the experience overall. John Dwight wrote in his influential periodical Dwight's Journal of Music: "The great, usurping, tyrannizing, noisy and pretentious thing is over, and there is a general feeling of relief, as if a heavy, brooding nightmare had been lifted from us all." However, the enormousness of the 1872 international jubilee in terms of audience, publicity, and programming created a precedent which served to inspire similar festivals in later years.

== Music associated with the festival ==
- Franz Abt. Hymn of Peace. Boston: Oliver Ditson & Co., 1872.
- Dudley Buck. Festival Hymn. Boston: Oliver Ditson & Co., 1872.
- Alberto Randegger. 150th Psalm. Boston: Oliver Ditson & Co., 1872.
- Johann Strauss II. Jubilee Waltz. Springfield, Mass.: Fay Hoadly, 1872.
- Julius Benedict. Our victorious banner. Boston: Ditson & Co., ca.1872.
- Alfred E Warren. Inman Line march. Boston: Louis P. Goullaud, 1872.
- Music to be performed at the World's Peace Jubilee and International Musical Festival: in Boston, June, 1872. Boston: O. Ditson, 1872.
- Supplement, containing music written expressly for (but not received in time to be performed at the) World's Peace Jubilee. Boston: Oliver Ditson & Co., 1872.

== Images ==
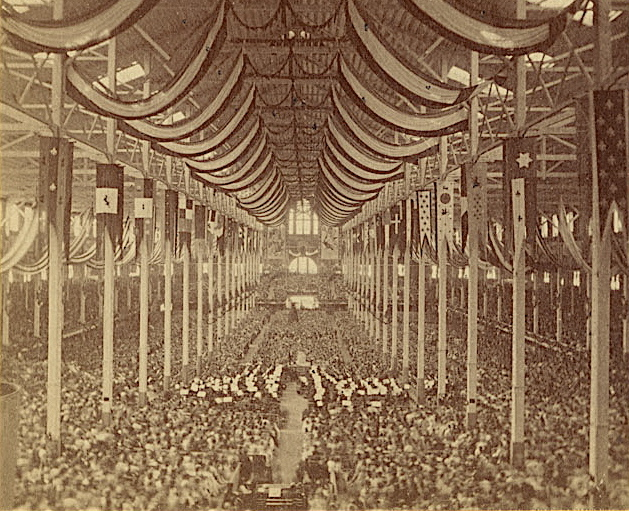
World's Peace Jubilee, Boston, 1872

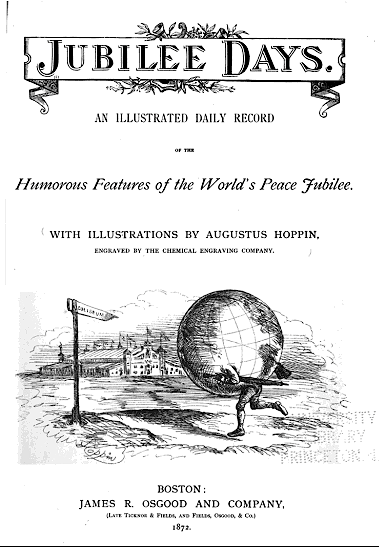
Jubilee Days, June 1872

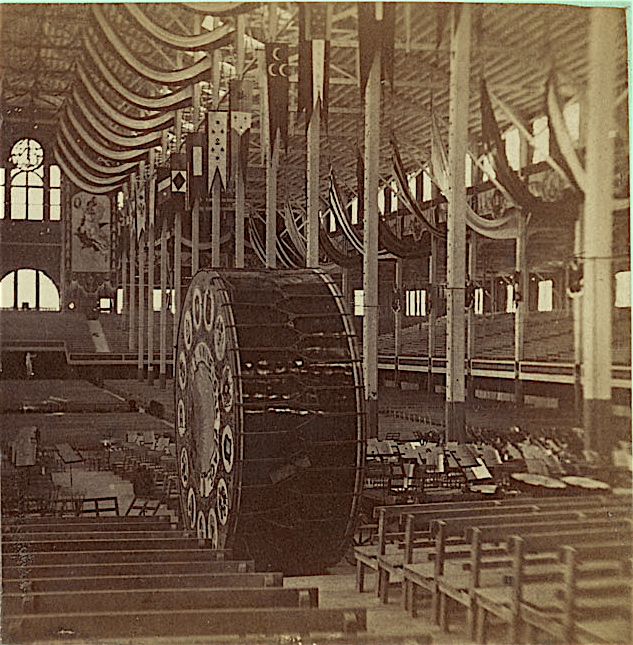
World's Peace Jubilee, Boston, 1872

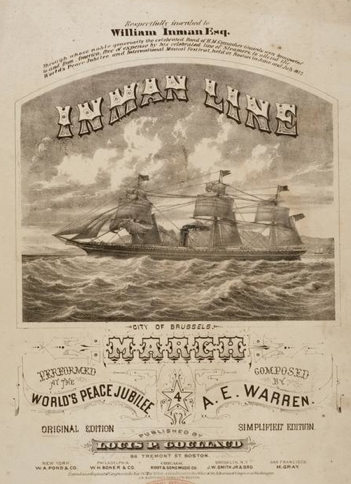
Cover of sheet music for Inman Line March, performed at the jubilee

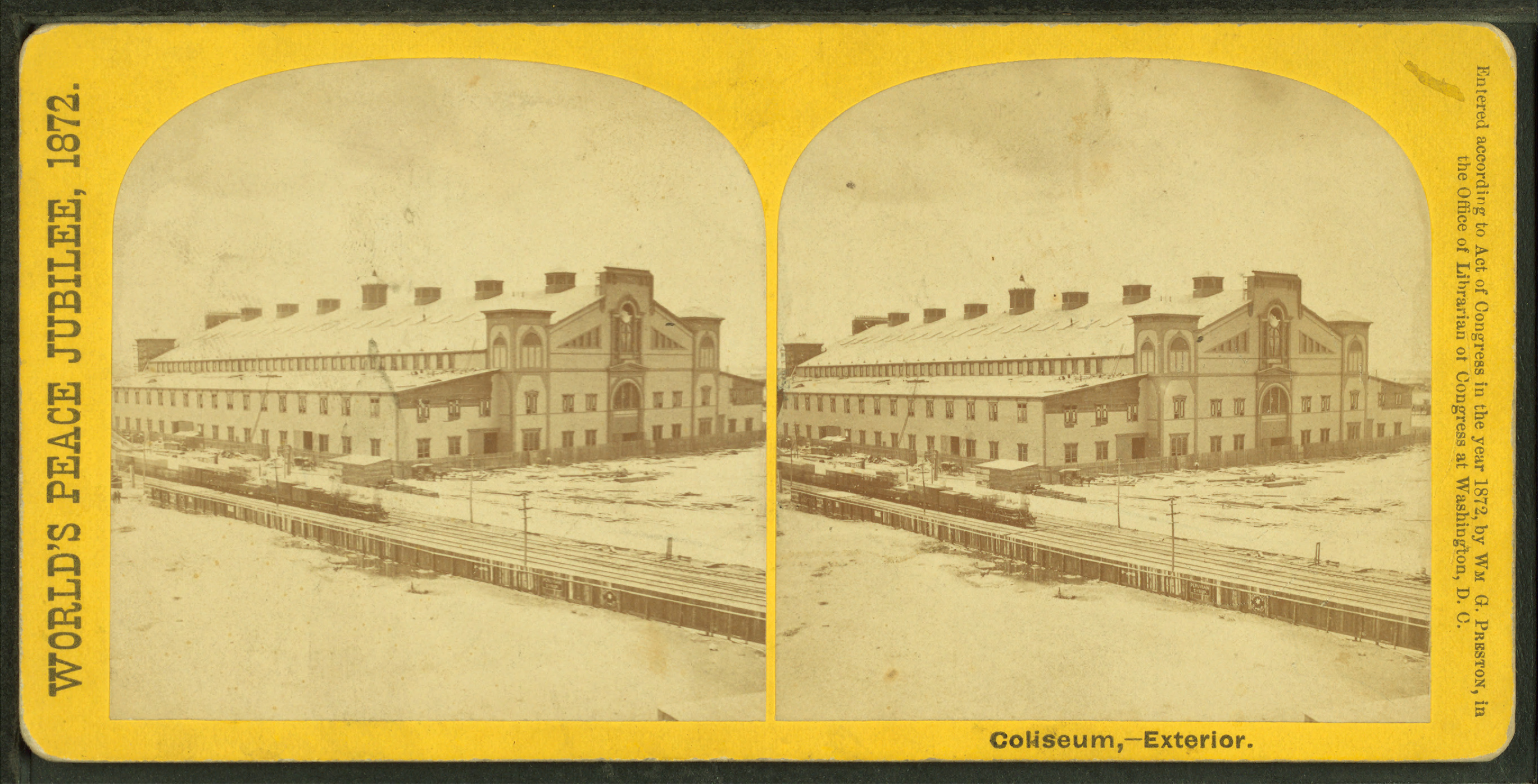
Coliseum

== See also ==
- National Peace Jubilee
