= Samuel Stillman Osgood =

American painter (1808–1885)

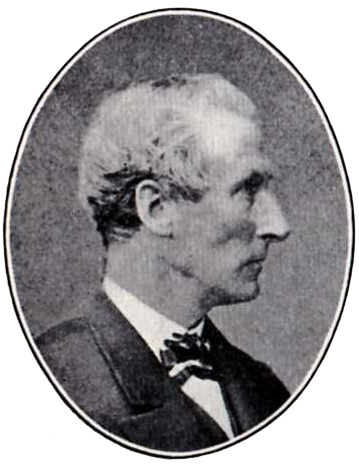
Samuel Stillman Osgood

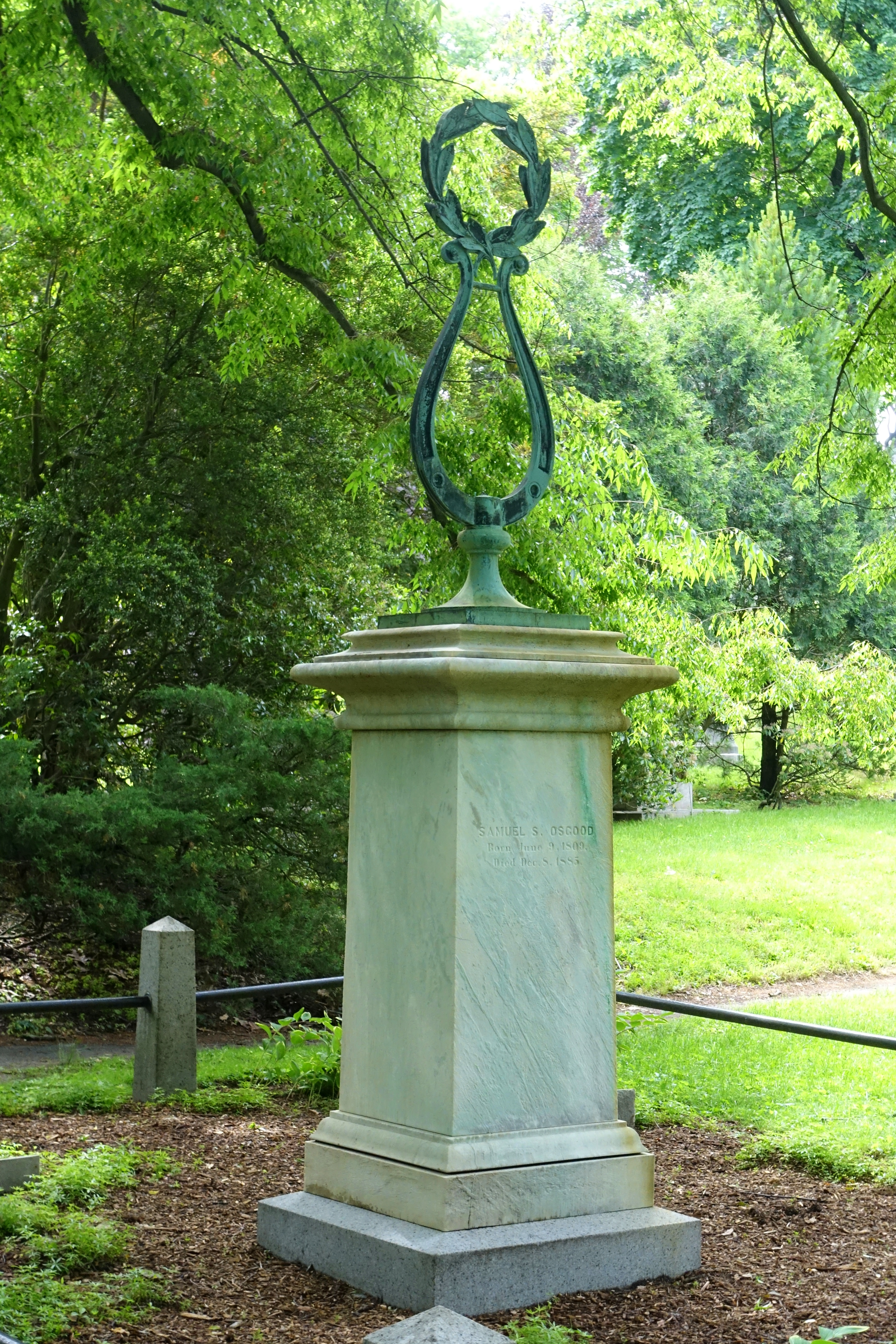
Osgood memorial

Samuel Stillman Osgood (June 9, 1808 – 1885) was a 19th-century American portrait painter.

== Biography ==
Osgood was born in New Haven, Connecticut, to James Osgood and Elizabeth Badger. He studied painting in Boston, Massachusetts. After his marriage to poet Frances Sargent Locke, he continued his art education at the Royal Academy in London. Upon returning to America, he settled in New York, New York, where he was made an associate of the National Academy of Design. In 1849, he went to California where he stayed nearly a year, prospecting for gold and painting portraits in San Francisco.

His wife died of tuberculosis in 1850. Osgood designed her memorial at Mount Auburn Cemetery in Cambridge, Massachusetts, where she was buried. Inspired by her poem "The Hand That Swept the Sounding Lyre", Osgood designed a 15-foot memorial: a white marble base topped by a bronze lyre crowned by a laurel wreath. Four of the five strings of the lyre were designed as cut (symbolizing his wife and three daughters, who were all dead by 1851). On his death, he asked his second wife, Sarah Rodman (Howland) Osgood, to cut the fifth string.

His portrait sitters included his wife, Edgar Allan Poe, Davy Crockett, John Sutter, Henry Clay, Alice Cary, Mary Boykin Chesnut, Thomas Campbell, Mary E. Hewitt and Caroline E. S. Norton.

== Gallery ==
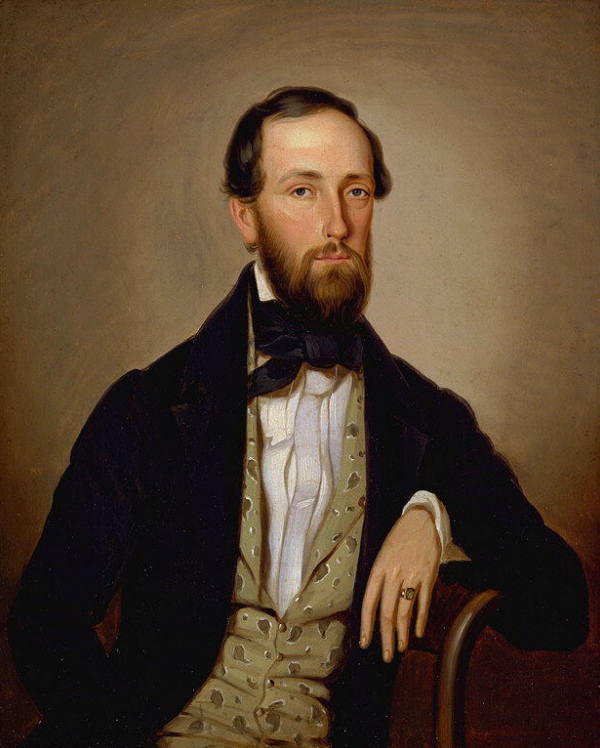
Rodman McCamley Price

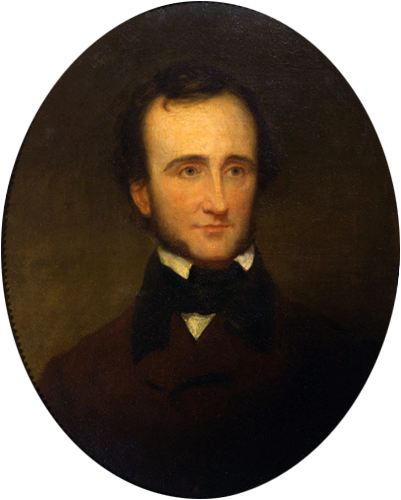
Edgar Allan Poe

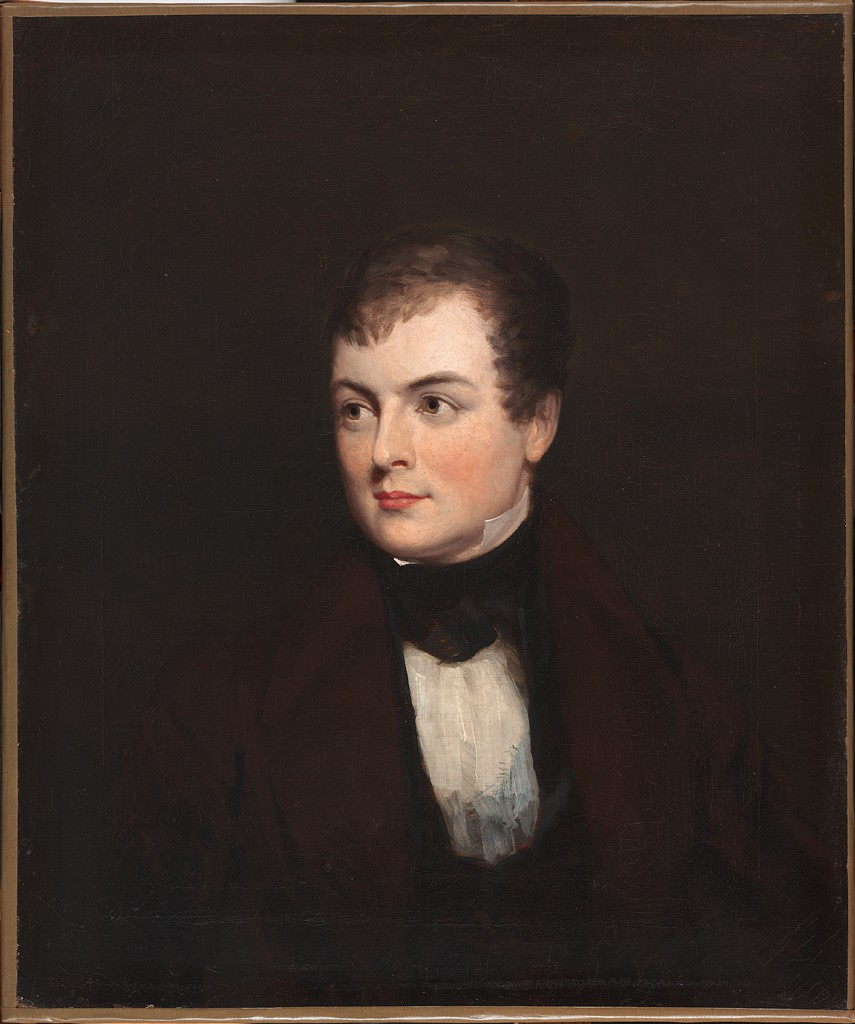
Epes Sargent

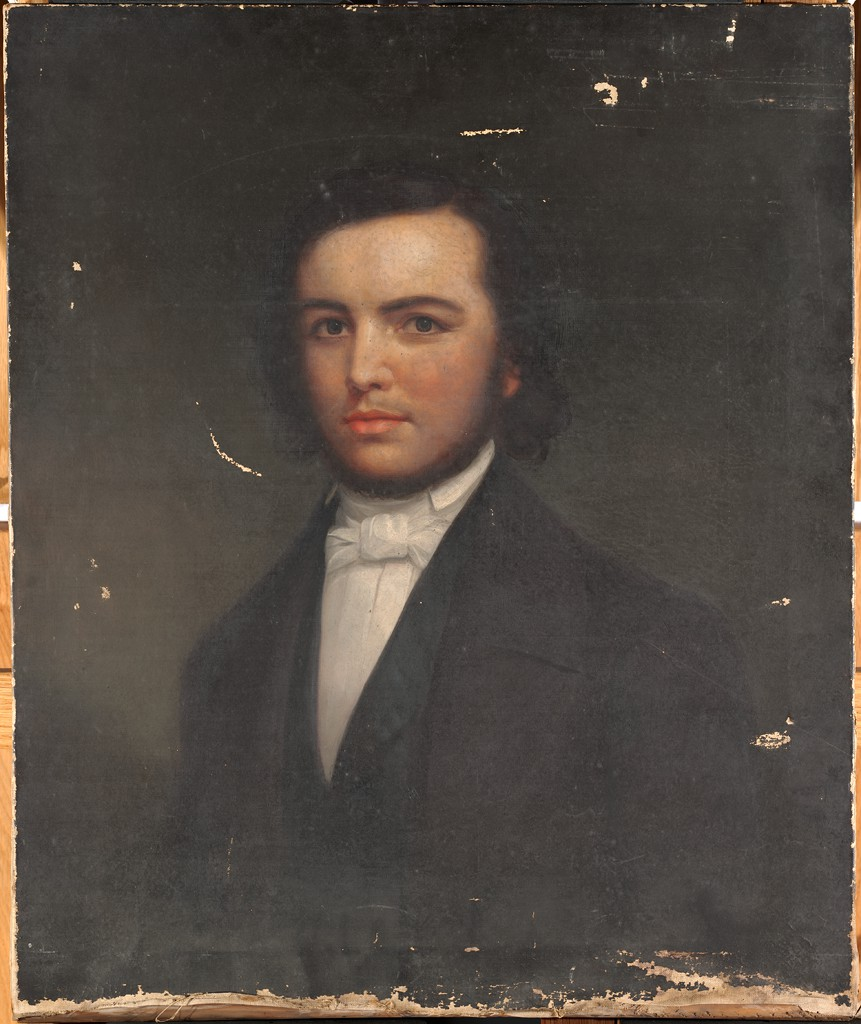
Robert Troupe Paine
