= Frances Sargent Osgood =

American poet (1811–1850)

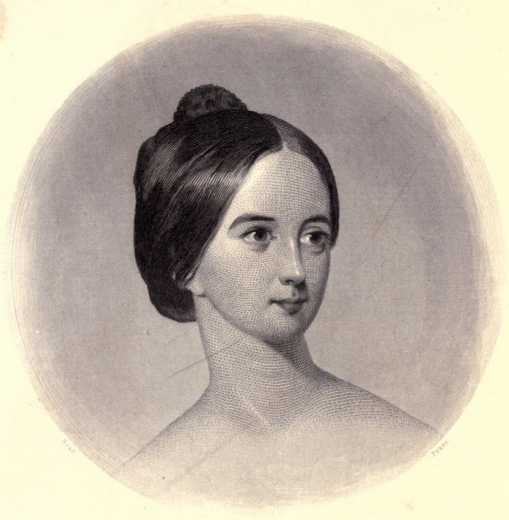
- A portrait of Osgood from an 1849 anthology
- Born: Frances Sargent Locke; June 18, 1811; Boston, Massachusetts, U.S.
- Died: May 12, 1850 (aged 38); New York City, U.S.
- Occupation: Poet
- Spouse: Samuel Stillman Osgood (m. 1835)
- Children: 3

Frances Sargent Osgood (née Locke; June 18, 1811 – May 12, 1850) was an American poet and one of the most popular women writers during her time. Nicknamed "Fanny", she was also famous for her exchange of romantic poems with Edgar Allan Poe.

== Life ==
=== Early life ===
Frances Sargent Locke was born in Boston, Massachusetts to Joseph Locke, a wealthy merchant, and his second wife, Mary Ingersoll Foster. Her father's first wife, Martha Ingersoll, was the sister of Mary, his second wife. Mary was also the widow of Benjamin Foster, by whom she had two children: William Vincent Foster and Anna Maria Wells, who would also become a published poet and close associate of Frances. Joseph and Mary had seven children, including another writer, Andrew Aitchison Locke. She grew up in Hingham, Massachusetts and as a young woman she attended the prestigious Boston Lyceum for Young Ladies. Her poetry was first published when she was fourteen in a bimonthly periodical of children's poetry called Juvenile Miscellany by editor Lydia Maria Child.

=== Marriage ===
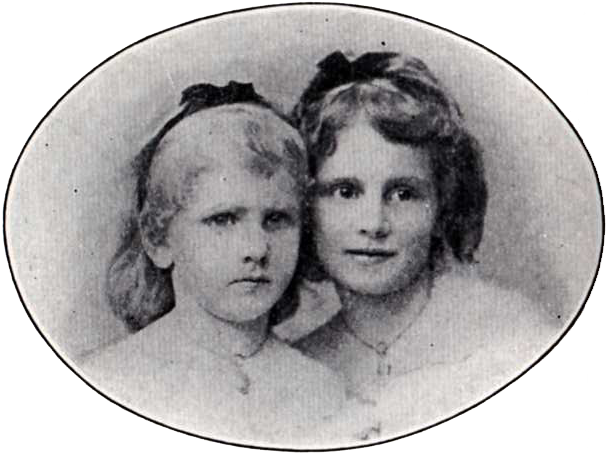
Osgood's daughters

In 1834, while composing poems inspired by paintings, Frances met Samuel Stillman Osgood, a young portrait artist at the Boston Athenæum. He asked her to sit for a portrait. They were engaged before the portrait was finished and married on October 7, 1835.

After their marriage, the couple moved to England. On July 15, 1836, their first daughter, Ellen Frances, was born. In 1838, while in England, she published her collection of poems A Wreath of Flowers from New England which included Elfrida, a dramatic poem in five acts. She then published another volume of poetry, The Casket of Fate.

Due to her father's death, the Osgoods returned to Boston in 1839. After the birth of their second daughter, May Vincent, on July 21, 1839, they moved to New York City. Osgood became a popular member of the New York literary society and a prolific writer. Many of her writings were published in the widely popular literary magazines of the time. She sometimes wrote under the pseudonyms "Kate Carol" or "Violet Vane". Her book, The Poetry of Flowers and the Flowers of Poetry was published in 1841. Some of her other published works were The Snowdrop, a New Year Gift for Children (1842), Rose, Sketches in Verse (1842), Puss in Boots (1842), The Marquis of Carabas (1844) and Cries in New York (1846).

Although she was successful in her professional life, her personal life suffered. It is speculated that the Osgoods separated by 1843. Frances Osgood's third daughter, Fanny Fay Osgood, was born in June 1846.

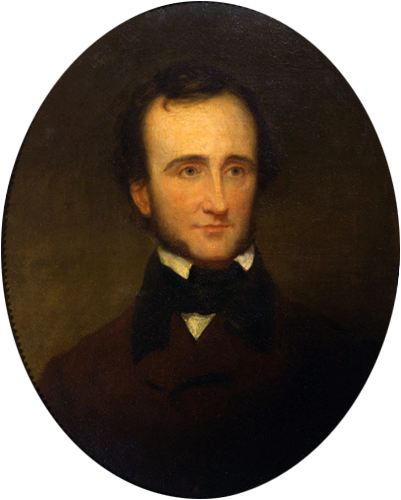
Portrait of Poe by Samuel Stillman Osgood, Frances's husband

=== Relationship with Poe ===
In February 1845, Poe gave a lecture in New York in which he criticized American poetry, especially that of Henry Wadsworth Longfellow. He made special mention, however, of Osgood, saying she had "a rosy future" in literature. Though she missed the lecture, she wrote to a friend, saying Poe was "called the severest critic of the day", making his compliment that much more impressive.

It is believed Poe and Osgood first met in person when introduced by Nathaniel Parker Willis in March 1845 when Osgood had been separated from (but not divorced from) her husband. Poe's wife, Virginia, was still alive, but in ill health. Poe may have been attracted to Osgood because they were both born in Boston and possibly due to her childlike qualities which were similar to Virginia's. She may have already been in an early stage of tuberculosis, just like Virginia.

In 1845, Poe used his role as one-third owner of the Broadway Journal to print some of Osgood's poems, including some flirtatious ones: "The Rivulet's Dream" (1845), "So Let It Be. To--" (1845), "Love's Reply" (1845), "Spring" (1845), "Slander" (1845), "Echo-Song" (1845), "To--" (1845), "A Shipwreck" (1845) and "To 'The Lady Geraldine" (1845). Poe responded with published poems of his own, occasionally under his pseudonym of Edgar T. S. Grey. Most notable is his poem "A Valentine". The poem is actually a riddle that conceals Osgood's name, found by taking letter 1 from line 1, letter 2 from line 2, and so on. Despite these passionate interchanges, the relationship between Poe and Osgood is often considered purely platonic.

Oddly, Poe's wife Virginia approved of the relationship and often invited Osgood to visit their home. Virginia believed their friendship had a "restraining" effect on her husband. Poe had given up alcohol to impress Osgood, for example. Virginia may also have been aware of her own impending death and was looking for someone who would take care of Poe. Osgood's husband, Samuel, also did not object, apparently used to his wife's impetuous behavior; he himself had a reputation as a philanderer.

Fellow poet Elizabeth F. Ellet, whose affection Poe had scorned, spread rumors about Poe and Osgood's friendship, even contacting Virginia about alleged improprieties. Ellet even suggested that Osgood's third child, Fanny Fay, was not her husband's, but Poe's. Fanny Fay was born in June 1846, but died in October. Poe biographer Kenneth Silverman says that Poe being Fanny Fay's father is "possible but most unlikely". Osgood, in an attempt to protect her public character, sent Margaret Fuller and Anne Lynch to request Poe return her personal letters to him to be destroyed. In July 1846, Osgood's husband, Samuel, demanded Ellet apologize to his wife, lest he sue her for defamation. Ellet responded in a letter, retracted her statements, and put the blame on Poe and his wife, Virginia. Osgood and Poe did not interact after 1847.

Poe was not the only man to engage in literary flirtation with Osgood. Several men wrote of their affection for her, including Rufus Wilmot Griswold, to whom Osgood dedicated a book of poetry. She also wrote a Valentine poem that mingled her own name with Griswold's. The competition between Griswold and Poe for Osgood may have led to their infamous rivalry, best exemplified in Griswold's character assassination of Poe after Poe's death.

=== Death ===
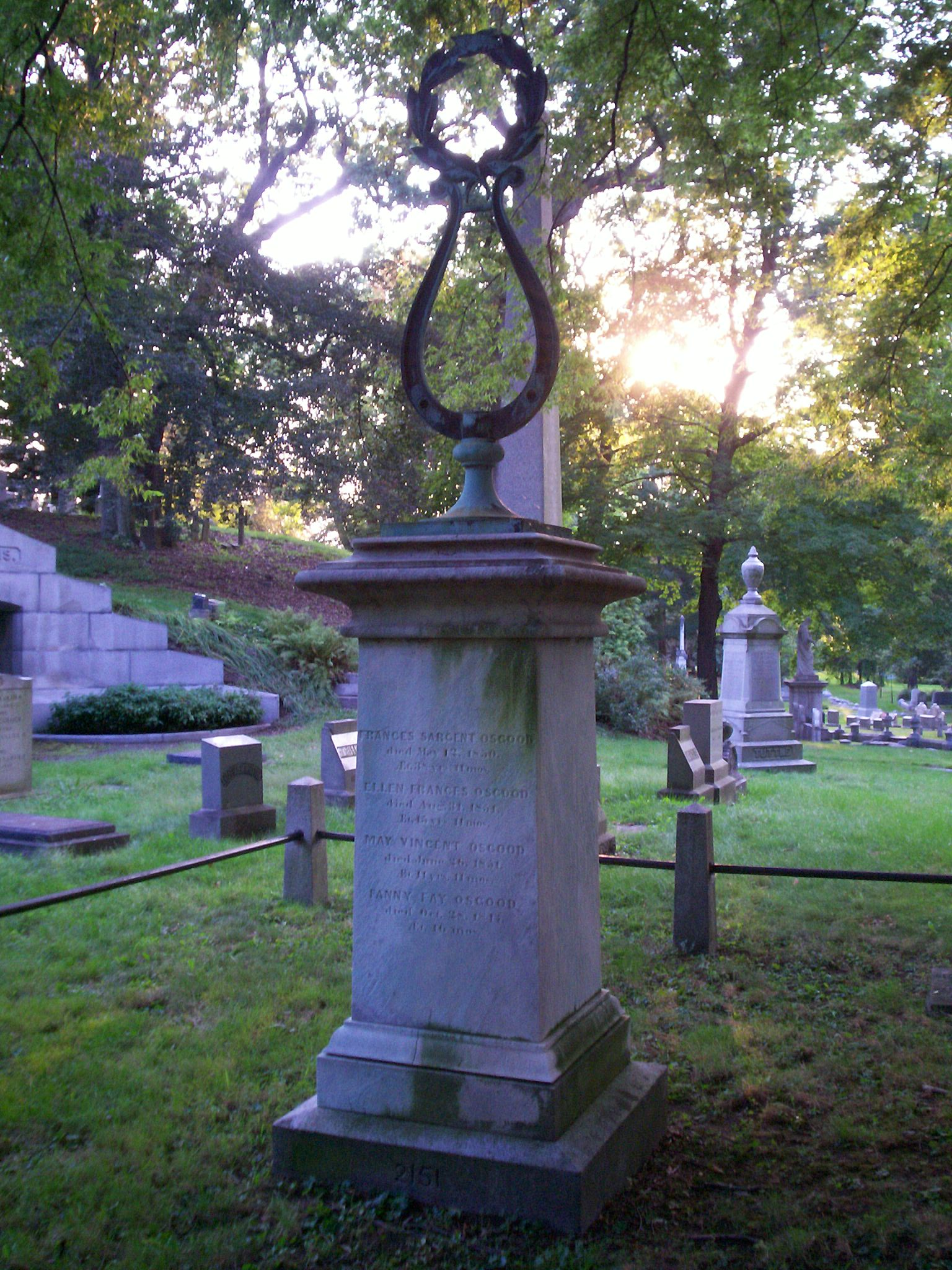
Grave of Frances Sargent Osgood and her family in Mount Auburn Cemetery

Osgood and her husband reconciled in 1846, and moved to Philadelphia for a short time to get away from the scandal. Although she was ill, she continued to write. She was confined to her room because of her illness by 1847, when her daughters were eleven and eight years old; much of her poetry from this period reflects her concern for them. Her husband, having difficulty making money as a painter, left her again in 1849 to join the California Gold Rush. He returned shortly before her death.

Osgood died of tuberculosis in 1850 at her home in New York. By then, she had lost her ability to speak; her last word, "angel", was written on a slate to her husband. She was buried in her parents' lot at Mount Auburn Cemetery in Cambridge, Massachusetts. In 1851, a collection of her writings was published by her friends and titled The Memorial, Written by Friends of the Late Mrs. Frances Sargent Locke Osgood. It was reissued as Laurel Leaves in 1854 and was edited with a biographical introduction by Griswold. The volume was meant to raise money for her memorial headstone. However, Fanny Fern noted that, by 1854, the plot remained unmarked and criticized Samuel Osgood in her book Fern Leaves from Fanny's Port-Folio. Samuel Osgood noted in the New York Evening Post that he had already designed a monument, inspired by her poem "The Hand That Swept the Sounding Lyre", which was soon installed.

Osgood's two daughters died the year after their mother; May Vincent Osgood died on June 26, 1851, and Ellen Frances died August 31.

== Writing ==
Osgood was a prolific writer and contributed to most of the leading periodicals of the time. She was one of the most admired women poets during the mid-1840s. Osgood was very open and personal in her writings, often discussing the relationships she had with others, despite her shy personality. A large portion of her body of work is love poetry but she also addresses poems to her mother, her sister, her husband, and several friends. The poems written to her children are not sentimental, but literary historian Emily Stipes Watts wrote that they "are honest attempts to express thoughts and emotions never so fully expressed before by women in poetry" depicting a sincere concern for their development and well-being.

Griswold once said that she created poems "with almost the fluency of conversation". Poe, in a review of her work, wrote that she was "absolutely without rival, we think, either in our own country or in England". He reviewed her poetry collection A Wreath of Flowers from New England in the September 1846 issue of Godey's Lady's Book, saying that its author exhibits "deep feeling and exquisite taste" and her work deserved wider circulation.

== Selected list of works ==
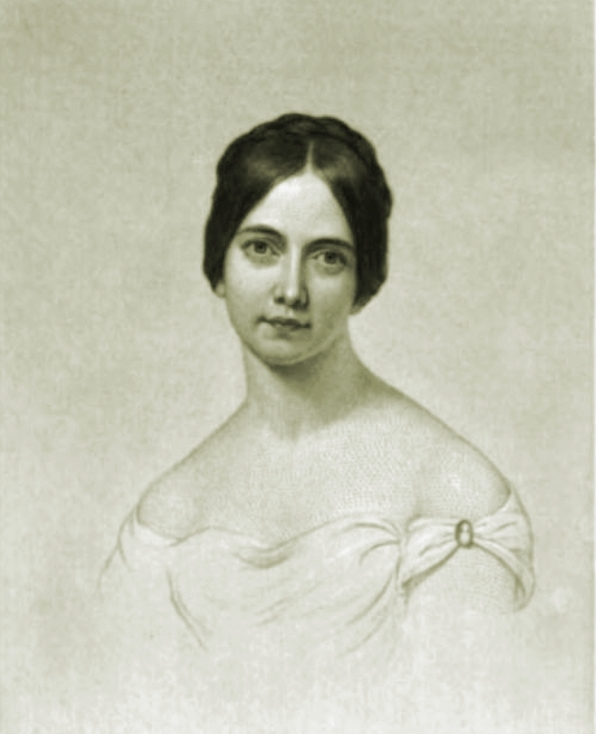
Engraving of Frances Osgood from her 1850 collection of poetry

- A Wreath of Flowers from New England (1838)
- The Casket of Fate (1839)
- The Poetry of Flowers and the Flowers of Poetry (1841)
- The Snowdrop, a New Year Gift for Children (1842)
- Rose, Sketches in Verse (1842)
- Puss in Boots (1842)
- The Marquis of Carabas (1844)
- Cries in New York (1846)
- The Memorial, Written by Friends of the Late Mrs. Frances Sargent Locke Osgood (published posthumously in 1851)
- Laurel Leaves (published posthumously in 1854)

== See also ==
- "To Frances" poem by Edgar Allan Poe
- "To F——s S. O——d" poem by Edgar Allan Poe
- Sarah Elmira Royster – A childhood sweetheart of Poe
- Sarah Helen Whitman – Had a similar relationship with Poe
- Impromptu. To Kate Carol by Edgar Allan Poe
- Anna Maria Wells

== Sources ==
- Child, Lydia Maria Francis. The Juvenile Miscellany. Boston, Mass: Printed and published by John Putnam, 1826. worldcat.org Accessed January 27, 2008
- Locke, John G. Book of the Lockes. A Genealogical and Historical Record of the Descendants of William Locke, of Woburn. Boston: J. Munroe and co, 1853. (p. 139) (Google Books). Accessed January 30, 2008
- Meyers, Jeffrey. Edgar Allan Poe: His Life and Legacy. Cooper Square Press, 1992. ISBN 0-8154-1038-7.
- Moss, Sidney P. Poe's Literary Battles: The Critic in the Context of His Literary Milieu. Southern Illinois University Press, 1969.
- Quinn, Arthur Hobson. Edgar Allan Poe: A Critical Biography. Baltimore: The Johns Hopkins University Press, 1998. ISBN 0-8018-5730-9
- Silverman, Kenneth. Edgar A. Poe: Mournful and Never-ending Remembrance. Harper Perennial, 1991. ISBN 0-06-092331-8.
- Sova, Dawn B. Edgar Allan Poe: A to Z. New York: Checkmark Books, 2001. ISBN 0-8160-4161-X.
- Watts, Emily Stipes. The Poetry of American Women from 1632 to 1945. Austin, Texas: University of Texas Press, 1978. ISBN 0-292-76450-2
