= Mina =

Mina or variants may refer to:

== Arts and entertainment ==
- Mina (1964 album), by Italian singer Mina
- Mina (1971 album), by Italian singer Mina
- Mina®, by Italian singer Mina, 1974
- Mina (TV series), a South Korean drama, 2001

== Languages and ethnic groups ==
- Mina language (disambiguation), several uses
- Gen-Mina people, or Mina, from Togo and Benin
- Mina (historical ethnic term), various communities in Western Africa and the Americas
  - Mina (Louisiana)
- Meena, a tribe from northern and western India

== People ==
- Mina (given name), including a list of people and characters with the name
- Mina (surname), including a list of people with the name
- Minà, a surname, including a list of people with the name
- Mina (Iranian singer) (born 18th century; died 19th century)
- Mina (Italian singer) (Mina Anna Mazzini, born 1940)
- Mina (German singer) (born 1993)
- Mina (Japanese singer) (Mina Sharon Myoi, born 1997), member of South Korean girl group Twice
- Mina (voice actress) (Mina Kasai, born 1984)

== Places ==
=== Iran ===
- Mina, Fars
- Mineh, Lorestan Province
- Mina, Razavi Khorasan
- Mehneh, Razavi Khorasan Province

=== United States ===
- Mina, Nevada
- Mina, New York
- Mina, Ohio
- Mina, South Dakota

=== Elsewhere ===
- Mina, Burkina Faso
- Mina, Nuevo León, Mexico
- Mina, Iloilo, Philippines
- Mina, Saudi Arabia
- Al-Mina, a modern name given to an ancient coast settlement in Syria
- El Mina, Lebanon, the original site of the harbor of the Phoenician city of Tripoli
- Costa da Mina, Portuguese name for a historical West African region
- Elmina, Ghana
- Mina 3, Santa Cruz Province, Argentina
- Mina River (Algeria)
- Mina River (Indonesia)
- Abu Dhabi Vegetable Market, or Al Mina Fruit & Vegetable Market, Abu Dhabi, United Arab Emirates

== Other uses ==
- Mina (drum), a Venezuelan drum
- MINA (gene), which encodes RIOX2, formerly known as MYC-induced nuclear antigen
- Mina (month), in the Indian solar calendar
- Mina, a month in the Darian calendar for Mars
- Mina (Sikhism), a heretical sect of Sikhs
- Mina (unit), an ancient Near Eastern unit of weight and currency
- Mina, a station on Mexico City Metrobús Line 3
- Montenegrin News Agency, or MINA
- Apache MINA, an open source Java network application framework

== See also ==
- Meena (disambiguation)
- Mena (disambiguation)
- Menas (disambiguation)
- Mene (disambiguation)
- Menes (fl. c. 3100 BC), Egyptian pharaoh
- Minas (disambiguation)
- Myna (disambiguation)
- Min (disambiguation)
- Minaq, a village in East Azerbaijan, Iran
