= Meme (disambiguation) =

A meme is a term referring to a unit of cultural information transferable from one mind to another.

Meme, or MEME, may also refer to:

== Places ==
- Meme (department), a division of the Southwest province in Cameroon
- Meme, Mingin, Myanmar (Burma)

== People ==
- Meme McDonald, Australian writer and theatre director
- David Meme, English musician
- Mihai Stoica (also known as Meme Stoica), Romanian Football Club manager
- Belén Barenys, Spanish actress and singer, sometimes known by the stage name MEMÉ

== Arts, entertainment, and media ==
=== Film and television ===
- Mīmu Iro Iro Yume no Tabi (The Many Dream Journeys of Meme), a 1983 science-themed educational anime television series starring a "meme" who inhabits computer networks
- Meme (film), an American independent drama
- Meme Bashame (馬車芽 めめ), a character in the anime and manga series My Deer Friend Nokotan

=== Games ===
- "Meme", the second expansion pack for the Metal Gear series of games

=== Internet and social media ===
- Internet meme, a meme or fad that spreads quickly through the Internet
- Yahoo! Meme, a microblogging site launched by Yahoo! Inc. in August 2009, similar to Twitter

=== Music ===
- Meme (band), an American indie pop group
- Meme (album), a 2005 album by Rurutia
- Meme, a 2006 album by Milosh
- "Meme" a 2026 song by Baby Dolls

== Technology and measurement ==
- Multiple EM for Motif Elicitation (MEME), a motif discovery and search system in bioinformatics
- Teme (philosophy), technological-meme

== Mythology ==
- Gborogboro and Meme, the first man and woman in Lugbara mythology
- Meme (Mesopotamian goddess), a minor Mesopotamian goddess

== Other ==
- Mem (also spelled Meme), the thirteenth letter of the Semitic abjads

== See also ==
- Image macro, a type of Internet meme commonly referred to as a "meme"
- MEMZ
- MeMZ
- Mneme (disambiguation)
- Mene (disambiguation)
- Meem (disambiguation)
