= Mena =

Mena or MENA may refer to:

== Arts, entertainment, and media ==
- Mena (album), a 2010 album by Javiera Mena
- MENA (news), an Egyptian publicly funded news agency
- Mena Report, a business news source
- Mena, the original title of the 2017 film American Made, about the life of drug smuggler Barry Seal starring Tom Cruise

== People ==
- Mena (surname), list of people with the surname
- Mena (given name), list of people with the given name

== Places ==
- MENA, acronym for Middle East and North Africa

=== Americas ===
- Francisco Z. Mena Municipality in Puebla, Mexico
- Juan de Mena, Paraguay, a district of Cordillera Department
- Mena, Arkansas, United States
  - Mena School District

=== Africa ===
- Abu Mena, pilgrimage center in Late Antique Egypt
- Mena House Hotel, a resort near Cairo, Egypt
- Mena River, in eastern Ethiopia
- Mena, Koulikoro, Mali
- Mena, Sikasso, Mali

=== Asia ===
- Mena Station, railway station in Rankoshi, Isoya District, Hokkaidō, Japan
- Mena, Badin, a village in Sindh, Pakistan

=== Europe ===
- Mena, Cornwall, hamlet in England
- Valle de Mena (Valley of Mena), a municipality in Burgos, Spain
- Mena Raion, abolished district of Chernihiv Oblast, Ukraine
  - Mena, Ukraine, city in Chernihiv Oblast
- Mena River, a river in Ukraine, a tributary of Desna River

=== In Space ===
- Mena (Mercurian crater), on Mercury
- Mena (Martian crater), on Mars

== Science and technology ==
- MENA (cable system), a planned submarine telecommunications link between Italy and India
- Mena, one of three members of the Ena/Vasp homology proteins in mice
- Mena, a genus of sea anemone

== Mythological uses ==
- Mena or Dea Mena, a Roman goddess of menstruation; see List of Roman birth and childhood deities
- Latin rendering of Mene (goddess)
- Mena, or Menavati or Mainavati, a Hindu goddess, wife of the mountain king Himalaya-personified as Himavan

== See also ==
- Luis Mena (disambiguation)
- Menas (disambiguation)
- Meena (disambiguation)
- Mene (disambiguation)
- Menna (disambiguation)
- Mina (disambiguation)
