= Station days =

Christian days of fasting

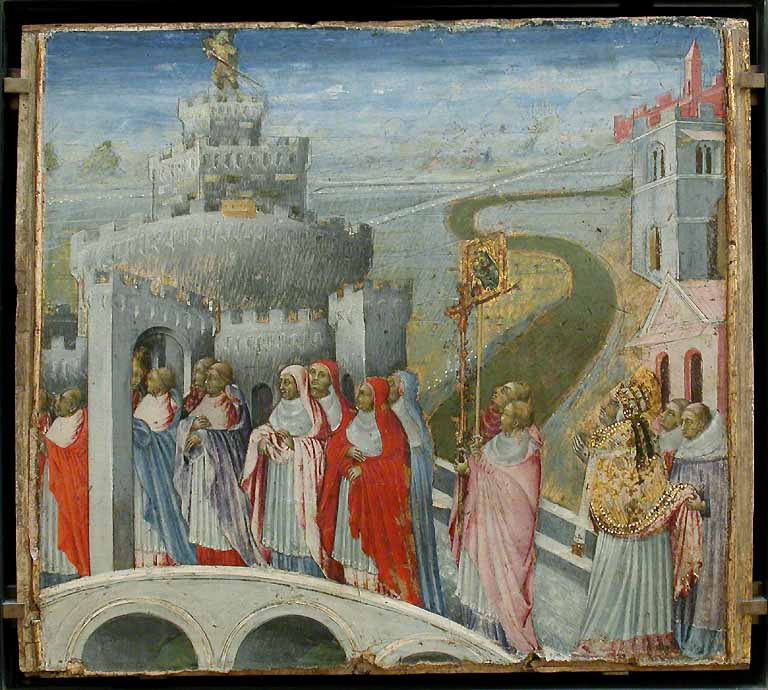
Gregory the Great set the classic order of churches for the Lenten station days in the sixth century. (The Procession of Saint Gregory to the Castle Sant'Angelo, c. 1465.)

Station days were days of fasting in the early Christian Church, associated with a procession to certain prescribed churches in Rome, where the Mass and Vespers would be celebrated to mark important days of the liturgical year. Although other cities also had similar practices, and the fasting is no longer prescribed, the Roman churches associated with the various station days are still the object of pilgrimage and ritual, especially in the season of Lent.

== Ancient practice ==
Station days grew out of the early Christian practice of visiting the tombs of the martyrs and celebrating the Eucharist at those sites. By the fourth century, the practice of carrying out an itinerary to various churches of the city began to develop during the days of Lent. In those days it became a tradition for the pope to visit a church in each part of the city and celebrate Mass with the congregation.

In the early centuries, the Lenten fast lasted all day, and so towards the evening, the Christians of Rome would begin to gather at a church known as the collecta ("gathering place"), where they would be joined by the assembled clergy of the city and the pope. The procession would then move through the streets to the station church, not far away. (Note: There was no collect church for Sunday stations. Eventually, the practice of meeting at the collect churches became obsolete. In fact, many of the ancient collect churches have been destroyed.) Having gathered at the daily statio ("standing place"), the pope would then celebrate a solemn Mass, and fragments of the Host were sent to the other stationes of the city in order to symbolize the unity of the city around its bishop. After the conclusion of Vespers, the day's fast was broken with a communal meal.

In the earliest form of the Lenten itinerary, only about twenty-five churches were assigned as stationes. More precisely, the statio was defined not as the church building, but the relics of the martyr whose relics were housed within. (For example, rather than "Station at the Basilica of St. Anastasia", the station was considered to be "at St. Anastasia" herself.)

In the sixth century, Pope Gregory the Great fixed the classic order of these stations, and confirmed the tradition that the more solemn festivals of the liturgical year should be marked with the standard practices: assembling at Sext, continuing in procession to the statio, celebrating the Eucharistic liturgy, and finishing with Vespers.

The practice of keeping stations continued beyond Lent into Eastertide. The stations for the Easter season proceeded in order of sanctity: from St. John Lateran, which is dedicated to Christ, the Savior, for the Easter Vigil, to St. Mary Major on Easter day, to the shrines of principal patrons of the city over the next three days: St. Peter, St. Paul, and St. Lawrence.

=== Liturgical influence ===
The stational liturgy of the early Roman Church had an important part in determining the various readings for strong liturgical seasons, such as Lent. For example, in the pre-1970 Missal, the Gospel for the Thursday after Ash Wednesday was always Matthew 8:5–13, the healing of the centurion's servant. This reading was almost certainly chosen because the station of that day was San Giorgio in Velabro, where the relics of the soldier-saint George are kept. Likewise, the station at Sant'Eusebio on Friday of the Fourth Week of Lent recalls the Gospel of that day, the raising of Lazarus, given the proximity of that church to the cemetery on the Esquiline.

In addition to their influence on the lectionary, the station churches also left traces in the other texts of the Mass. A prominent example is the petition for "the protection of the Doctor of the Gentiles" (i.e. Saint Paul) in the collect of Sexagesima. This petition reflects the gathering of the Roman faithful at the Basilica of Saint Paul outside the Walls on Sexagesima Sunday.

It should also be noted that for the early centuries of the Roman Church, Mass was never celebrated on Thursdays. Therefore, when the liturgy began to be celebrated on that day in the eighth century, new stations were added to the list which are later than the original stations as defined by Gregory the Great.

== Modern revival ==
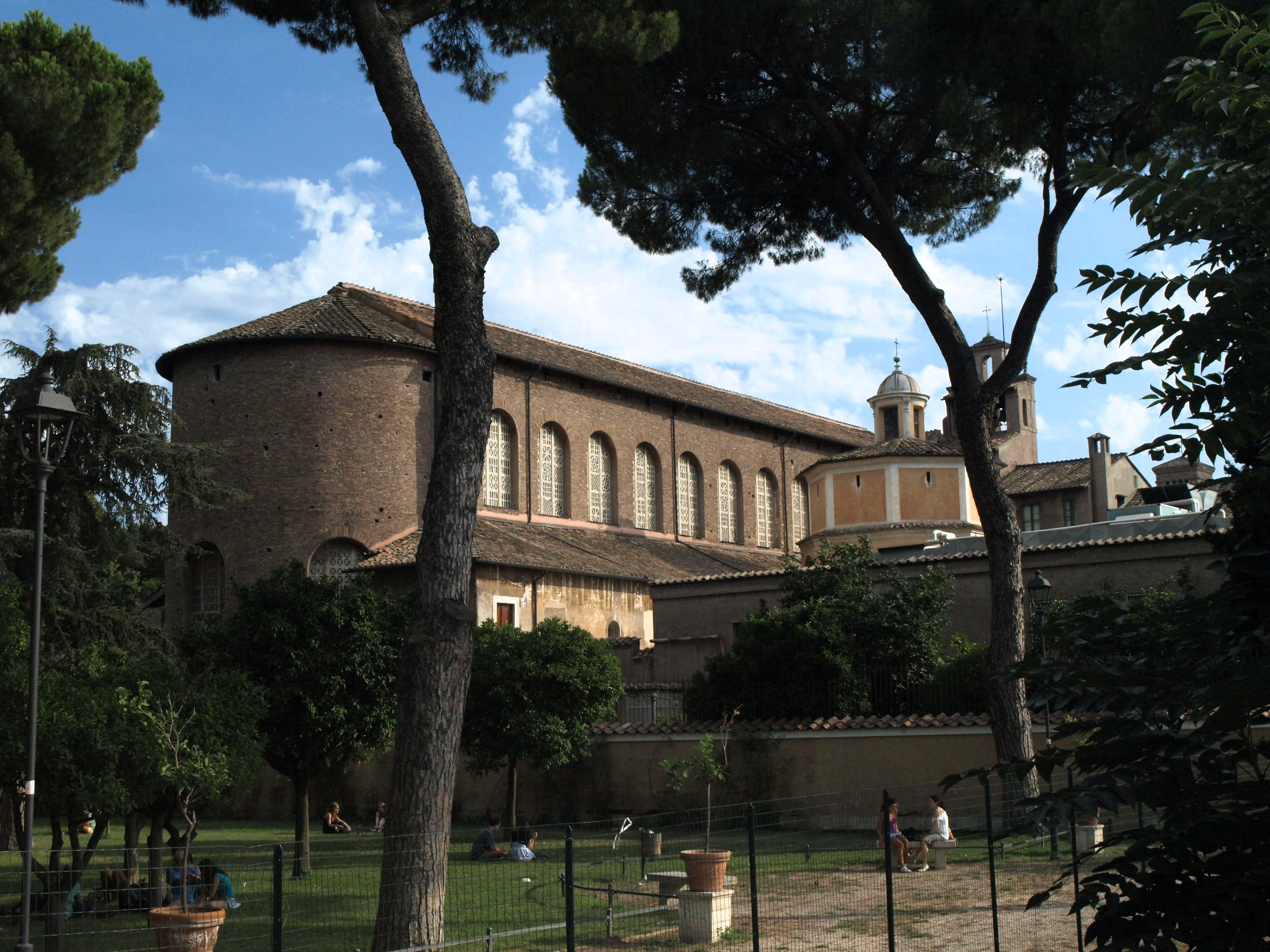
Popes since John XXIII have revived the practice of visiting the station for Ash Wednesday, Santa Sabina all'Aventino.

The practice of keeping stations gradually waned in Rome, starting after the Gregorian reforms of the eleventh century began to place more emphasis on the pope as administrator, and papal liturgies began to be celebrated in private, rather than among the people of the city. The keeping of stations ceased entirely during the Avignon papacy, and left their trace only as notations in the Roman Missal.

After the Lateran Treaty of 1929 solved the Roman Question, Pope Pius XI and Pius XII encouraged a return to the ancient tradition by attaching indulgences for visiting the station churches of Lent and Easter. Concrete gestures on the part of Pope John XXIII and Paul VI also began a revival, as John XXIII was the first pope in modern times to celebrate Ash Wednesday at Santa Sabina, and Paul VI visited Sant'Eusebio on its station day in 1967.

The greatest impetus towards the recovery of the ancient tradition, however, has been the student-organized station church program put on by the Pontifical North American College. The North American College has coordinated a public station Mass in English at all the station churches of Lent, from Monday to Saturday, every year since 1975. (Note: For more information on this annual pilgrimage, consult the website of the North American College.) In recent years, the Diocese of Rome too hosts Italian-language Lenten station Masses at the traditional evening hour.

=== Seven Church Walk ===
In addition to the station churches, a long-standing Roman custom is to visit the four major basilicas and the three of the more important minor basilicas, in what is commonly called the Seven Church Walk. This is traditionally done on Wednesday of Holy Week. Outside of that day, the Church allows for the following indulgence:

A plenary indulgence is granted the Christian faithful who devoutly visit one of the four patriarchal basilicas in Rome and there recite the Our Father and the Creed: 1) on the basilica's titular feast; 2) on Sundays and the other 10 holy days of obligation; 3) once a year or on any other day chosen by the individual Christian faithful.

=== Indulgences ===
The fourth edition of the Enchiridion Indulgentiarum (1999) lists the following as an opportunity for the faithful to obtain a plenary indulgence:

33. Visiting Sacred Places (Visitationes locorum sacrorum) §2. ...[A] plenary indulgence is granted to the faithful who assist in the sacred functions held in any stational church on its designated day; if they merely visit the church devoutly, the indulgence will be partial.

== Station churches of Lent and the Easter Octave ==
On some days, the list of stations has more than one church. The original reason was simply that the crowds would be too large to handle if only one church was used, so an alternate was also designated. In such cases, the most important (i.e., the original traditional station) is listed first, but indulgences can still be gained by attending the alternate. In a few cases the original station has been destroyed (for example, when the station at San Trifone was transferred to Sant'Agostino). Also in the 1930s two churches were raised to stational status by the Pope, as "alternates", by reason of their importance.

The following list of collect and station churches for Lent is taken from Mabillon's Ordo Romanus XVI, which for the most part, is still current. If changes have occurred, such as in cases when the original church is destroyed, the current station is provided. The stations for the Easter Octave are taken from what is provided in the Roman Missal.

	Sunday	Monday	Tuesday	Wednesday	Thursday	Friday	Saturday
AW				S. Anastasia; **S. Sabina**	S. Nicola in Carcere; **S. Giorgio in Velabro**	S. Lucia in Septizonio (Note: Santa Lucia in Septizonio stood under the slope of the Palatine, just north of the junction of Via di San Gregorio and Via dei Cerci. It was titular, but fell into ruins and vanished at the end of the sixteenth century. It is also known as in Septisolio, in Septem Soliis, or in Septem Viis in the sources.); **Ss. Giovanni e Paolo**	S. Lorenzo in Lucina; **S. Agostino** (Note: The Ordo Romanus names San Trifone as the station, but that small church was subsumed into the complex around Sant'Agostino and demolished in the eighteenth century.)
I	**S. Giovanni in Laterano**	Ss. Cosma e Damiano; **S. Pietro in Vincoli**	S. Nicola in Carcere; **S. Anastasia**	S. Pietro in Vincoli; **S. Maria Maggiore**; Ember Wednesday of Lent	S. Agata dei Goti; **S. Lorenzo in Panisp.**	S. Marco; **Ss. Apostoli**; Ember Friday of Lent	S. Maria in Traspontina; **S. Pietro in Vaticano**; Ember Saturday of Lent
II	**S. Maria in Domnica**	Ss. Cosma e Damiano; **S. Clemente**	None; **S. Balbina**	S. Giorgio in Velabro; **S. Cecilia in Trastevere**	S. Giorgio in Velabro; **S. Maria in Trastevere**	S. Agata dei Goti; **S. Vitale in Fovea**	S. Clemente; **Ss. Marcellino e Pietro**
III	**S. Lorenzo fuori le mura**	S. Adriano (Note: The church of Sant'Adriano is now deconsecrated, as it was restored to its original condition as the Curia Julia in the 1930s.); **S. Marco**	Ss. Sergio e Bacco (Note: This church in the Roman Forum was destroyed in the mid-to-late 1500s.); **S. Pudenziana**	S. Balbina; **S. Sisto Vecchio** (Note: San Sisto has been closed since 2013 for major repairs, so recent stational Masses have been held at the nearby Santi Nereo e Achilleo.)	S. Marco; **Ss. Cosma e Damiano**	S. Maria ad Martyres; **S. Lorenzo in Lucina**	S. Vitale in Fovea; **S. Susanna** (Note: The original station was San Caio, but it was demolished.)
IV	**S. Croce in Gerusalemme**	S. Stefano Rotondo; **Ss. Quattro Coronati**	S. Caterina dei Funari (Note: The original station as listed in the Ordo Romanus was S. Maria Dominae Rosae, a monastic church that was reconstructed in 1564 with a different name (S. Caterina dei Funari).); **S. Lorenzo in Damaso**	S. Menna (Note: This church was located nella vicinanza immediata della porta, "in the immediate vicinity of [Porta San Paolo]". The church vanished at some point after the tenth century.); **S. Paolo fuori le mura**	Ss. Quirico e Giulitta; **Ss. Silvestro e Martino**	Ss. Vito e Modesto; **S. Eusebio**	S. Angelo in Pescheria; **S. Nicola in Carcere**
V	**S. Pietro in Vaticano**	S. Giorgio in Velabro; **S. Crisogono**	None; **S. Maria in Via Lata** (Note: The Ordo Romanus provides San Ciriaco in Thermis as the day's station, but it had fallen into ruins and was abandoned by the late fifteenth century. A new station was assigned to the day by Pope Sixtus IV (1474–1484), Santi Quirico e Giulitta, but the station at Santa Maria in Via Lata was established by Pope Sixtus V (1585–1590) in recognition of the fact that the relics of Saint Cyriacus were transferred there after the abandonment of San Ciriaco de Camiliano.)	S. Marco; **S. Marcello al Corso**	S. Maria in Via Lata; **S. Apollinare**	Ss. Giovanni e Paolo; **S. Stefano Rotondo**	S. Sisto Vecchio; **S. Giovanni a P. Latina**
HW	Palm Sunday	Holy Monday	Holy Tuesday	Holy Wednesday	Maundy Thursday	Good Friday	Easter Vigil
HW	**S. Giovanni in Laterano** (Note: There used to be a procession of sorts from the chapel of San Silvestro, an oratory that was part of the mediaeval palace of the Lateran. The palms were blessed there. In the late sixteenth century, the chapel was destroyed when the palace was rebuilt. When Palm Sunday was celebrated in St. Peter's, as was often the case in the Middle Ages, the palms were blessed in a chapel called Santa Maria in Turri, which was situated in the first storey of the bell tower of old St. Peter's, now destroyed as well.)	S. Balbina; **S. Prassede** (Note: Although the Roman Missal lists Santa Prassede as the day's station, the Ordo Romanus lists Santi Nereo e Achilleo. John Baldovin lists this discrepancy among the recognized changes of the Gregorian sacramentaries. Note that the original procession would have proceeded from Santa Balbina to Santi Nereo e Achilleo, not to Santa Prassede, which is farther away.)	S. Maria in Campitelli; **S. Prisca**	S. Pietro in Vincoli (Note: The pope also anciently gave a homily about the Triduum at S. Giovanni in Laterano on this day.); **S. Maria Maggiore**	**S. Giovanni in Laterano**	**S. Croce in Gerusalemme**	**S. Giovanni in Laterano**
EO	Easter Sunday	Easter Monday	**S. Paolo fuori le mura**	**S. Lorenzo fuori le mura**	**Ss. Apostoli**	**S. Maria ad Martyres**	**S. Giovanni in Laterano**
EO	**S. Maria Maggiore**	**S. Pietro in Vaticano**	**S. Paolo fuori le mura**	**S. Lorenzo fuori le mura**	**Ss. Apostoli**	**S. Maria ad Martyres**	**S. Giovanni in Laterano**
EII	Sunday II of Easter						
EII	**S. Pancrazio**						
N.B. – If the day is assigned a collect church, it is listed in normal text above the name of the station, which is provided in **bold** text. Churches that no longer exist are italicized.

Table notes

== Stations of other liturgical seasons ==
The station churches outside of Lent did not have collect churches.

=== Stations of Advent ===
Day	Station
First Sunday	S. Maria Maggiore
Second Sunday	S. Croce in Gerusalemme
Third Sunday	S. Pietro in Vaticano
Ember Wednesday of Advent	S. Maria Maggiore (Note: The only ecclesiæ collectæ that Cardinal Schuster notes as existing outside of Lent are for the Ember Wednesday and Friday of Advent, which are simply the same as those for the Ember Wednesday and Friday of Lent.)
Ember Friday of Advent	Ss. Apostoli
Ember Saturday of Advent	S. Pietro in Vaticano
Fourth Sunday	Ss. Apostoli

=== Stations of Christmastide ===
Day	Station
Christmas Eve	S. Maria Maggiore
Christmas at night in the morning on the day	S. Maria Maggiore, at the manger S. Anastasia; S. Maria Maggiore (Note: Originally the station was at St. Peter's, but because of the relics of the manger in St. Mary Major the station was changed in the eleventh century.)
St. Stephen	S. Stefano Rotondo
St. John Evangelist	S. Maria Maggiore
Holy Innocents	S. Paolo fuori le mura
Mary, Mother of God	S. Maria in Trastevere (Note: The pre-1970 feast day was the Feast of the Circumcision, but taking into account the choice of station and the orations of the Mass, it was already celebrated in a strongly Marian way even before the liturgical reform.)
Epiphany	S. Pietro in Vaticano

=== Stations of Ember and Rogation Days ===
Day	Station
Ember Wednesday of September	S. Maria Maggiore
Ember Friday of September	Ss. Apostoli
Ember Saturday of September	S. Pietro in Vaticano
Major Rogation Day (April 25)	S. Pietro in Vaticano (Note: The Ordo Romanus cites St. Peter's as the day's station (the only station outside of Lent that it lists), and also provides a collect church, Santa Maria in Turri, which no longer exists.)
Rogation Monday	S. Maria Maggiore
Rogation Tuesday	S. Giovanni in Laterano
Rogation Wednesday	S. Pietro in Vaticano

=== Stations of other days ===
Day	Station
Weekdays after Sunday after Epiphany	Titulus Pammachi
Septuagesima	S. Lorenzo fuori le mura
Sexagesima	S. Paolo fuori le mura
Quinquagesima	S. Pietro in Vaticano
Ascension	S. Pietro in Vaticano
Pentecost on the vigil on the day	S. Giovanni in Laterano; S. Pietro in Vaticano
Pentecost Monday	S. Pietro in Vincoli
Pentecost Tuesday	S. Anastasia
Ember Wednesday of Pentecost	S. Maria Maggiore
Pentecost Thursday	S. Lorenzo fuori le mura
Ember Friday of Pentecost	Ss. Apostoli
Ember Saturday of Pentecost	S. Pietro in Vaticano

== Notes and references ==
Notes

Works cited

- Baldovin, John (1987), "The Urban Character of Christian Worship: The Origins, Development, and Meaning of Stational Liturgy", Orientalia Christiana Analecta, 228, Rome: Pontificium Institutum Studiorum Orientalium
- Lugano, Placido (1951), Le Sacre Stazioni Romane per la Quaresima e l'Ottava di Pasqua, Vatican City: Tipografia Poliglotta Vaticana
- Weigel, George; Lev, Elizabeth (2013), Roman Pilgrimage: The Station Churches, New York: Basic Books, ISBN 978-1482930269
