= Yaho =

Yaho may refer to:

- Yaho, Burkina Faso
- Yaho Department, Burkina Faso
- Yaho Station, East Japan Railway Company station in Kunitachi, Tokyo
- Yahweh
- Yaho (archeological site), fossil site from Chad known for human remains

== See also ==
- Yahoo!
- Yahoo (disambiguation)
