= Menna (disambiguation) =

Menna was an official of the Eighteenth Dynasty of Egypt.

Menna may also refer to:

== Given name ==
- Menna Clatworthy, British immunologist
- Menna El-Tanany (born 1990), Egyptian badminton player
- Menna Elfyn (born 1952), Welsh poet and playwright
- Menna Fadali (born 1983), Egyptian actress and singer
- Menna Fitzpatrick (born 1998), British alpine skier
- Menna Gallie (1919–1990), Welsh novelist
- Menna Hamed (born 1998), Egyptian squash player
- Menna Nasser (born 1994), Egyptian squash player
- Menna Shalabi (born 1981), Egyptian actress
- Menna Rawlings (born 1967), British diplomat
- Menna Richards, Welsh journalist
- Menna Tarek (born 2000), Egyptian footballer
- Menna van Praag, English novelist

== Surname ==
- Domenico Menna (1632–1691), Italian Catholic bishop
- Filiberto Menna (1926–1989), Italian art critic and art historian
- Joseph Menna (born 1970), American sculptor and engraver
- Lia Menna Barreto (born 1959), Brazilian artist
- Lisa Menna (born 1964), American magician
- Stella Menna (born 1988), Italian tennis player and food blogger

== Other ==
- Menna, Cornwall, a hamlet in the parish of Ladock, England
- Delo Menna, a district of Oromia Region, Ethiopia
- San Menna, a church in Rome
- Neochrysops menna, a butterfly in the family Lycaenidae

== See also ==
- Di Menna
- Saint Mennas (disambiguation)
- Mena (disambiguation)
- Meena
- Manna
