= San Ciriaco de Camiliano =

Church in Rome, Italy

Coordinates: 41°53′53″N 12°28′52″E

San Ciriaco de Camiliano was an ancient church of the city of Rome, formerly located on the present site of the Piazza del Collegio Romano near the Via del Corso (the ancient Via Lata of the Romans). It was demolished in 1491 during construction on the church of Santa Maria in Via Lata.

== Name and location ==
San Ciriaco was located near the Via Lata, not far from the so-called arcus Diburi, which was afterwards called the Camilianum. Mariano Armellini describes the arcus Diburi as an ancient arch surmounted by the tower, which was believed to be an entrance to a Roman monument called the Diribitorium, a large building begun by Agrippa, and finished by Augustus. It was apparently used to count votes and distribute salaries to the Roman militias, and its name derives from the diribitores, or election officials. It burned under Titus, together with the adjacent Iseum. By the Middle Ages, the old name of the arch had been lost in common parlance, and it was called arco maggiore ("large arch") or the arco di Camillo (although according to Christian Hülsen that name was more the result of mistaken scholarship in the sixteenth century than an indication that the site was ever associated with someone named Camillus). The arch was eventually named the Camillianum, which was applied to the neighborhood, and by extension, the church of San Ciriaco.

Its dedication was to Saint Cyriacus, a Roman martyr of the Diocletianic Persecution, whose relics were kept in the church.

== History ==
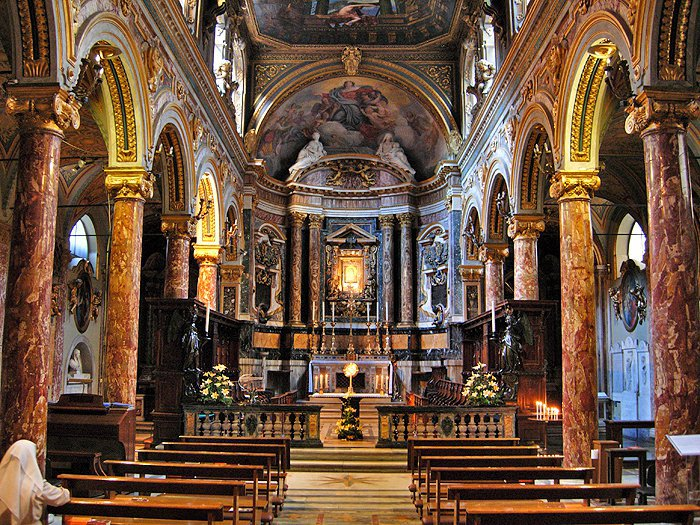
The former location of S. Ciriaco has been identified with the current high altar of S. Maria in Via Lata (shown here).

The origins of the church are underhood to be quite ancient, although Armellini notes that the tradition of it dating back to the time of Pope Sylvester is not quite worthy of belief. The church had a substantial connection to Cyriacus himself. His bodies, along with those of his two martyred companions, Largus and Smaragdus, were brought to Rome at the beginning of the fourth century. Their original resting place was near the Porta Salaria. From there they were moved to a cemetery near the Via Ostiensis, and finally, in about the tenth century to transferred — not to the church named after him, but to the church of Santa Maria in Via Lata.

In 1491, Pope Innocent VIII ordered a complete reconstruction and expansion of the church of Santa Maria in Via Lata, which required the church of San Ciriaco to be demolished. Giovanni Severano attests that San Ciriaco was located precisely where the high altar of Santa Maria in Via Lata is today. The main portal of the church would have been accessed from the modern Via Lata, which connects the Via del Corso to the Piazza del Collegio Romano.

=== Relation to the stational liturgy ===
Another church dedicated to Saint Cyriacus in the city — San Ciriaco in Thermis — was one of the stationes of the ancient Roman stational liturgy, formerly assigned to Tuesday of the fifth week of Lent. The twelfth-century Ordo Romanus XVI provides that San Ciriaco as the site of that day's liturgy. Because it had fallen into ruins, a new station at Santi Quirico e Giulitta was assigned to the day by Pope Sixtus IV (1474–1484). The station was later transferred to Santa Maria in Via Lata by Pope Sixtus V (1585–1590) in recognition of the fact that the relics of Saint Cyriacus had been transferred there from San Ciriaco de Camiliano. Santa Maria in Via Lata remains the assigned station for Tuesday of the fifth week of Lent.

== Monastery ==
The church was noted for the monastery of Ss. Ciriaco e Niccolò (Saints Cyriacus and Nicholas), which was attached to it. Hülsen traces the origin of this monastery to the tenth century, citing a document from 972 that refers to monasterium sancti Christi martyris Cyriaci atque Nicolai confessoris, quod ponitur in Via Lata. (Note: "The monastery of the holy martyr of Christ Cyriacus and Nicholas the Confessor, which is located on the Via Lata.") Armellini states that the name of Saint Nicholas was added to the monastery because there was a church dedicated to him nearby (S. Nicolaus de Pinea), which was eventually subsumed by the monastery complex. Hülsen, on the other hand, writes that the additional dedication was due to the translation of some of St. Nicholas' relics in the tenth century, while acknowledging the existence of the church that Armellini mentions.

The monastery, having fallen into decadence, was suppressed by Pope Eugene IV with a bull of March 19, 1435.

Armellini reports finding in the Vatican Archives a document attesting to the discovery of the cemetery of the ancient monastery church complex, further establishing its location on the current site of Santa Maria in Via Lata: the ruins had been found while the Pamphili family were paving part of their garden to set up a stable. (Note: Il Cemeterio (del monastero) s'è scoperto alcuni mesi sono. [...] mentre il Sig. principe Pamfilio spianava il giardino per fabricare la stalla nel Palazzo della Signora D. Olimpia Aldobrandini Prencipessa di Rossano sua consorte, per levarla dalla vicinanza dell'Oratorio di S. Paolo e della chiesa di S. Maria in Via Lata.) This was during the lifetime of Olimpia Aldobrandini (1623–1681).

In the treasury of the church of Santa Maria in Via Lata, Armellini reports having seen a parchment codex, finished with a cover of beaten silver plate, adorned with cut glass, and containing an ancient copy of the Gospel of Luke. Inside is a dedication, written by the abbess of the monastery of Ss. Ciriaco e Niccolò: Suscipe Christe et s. Cyriace atque Nicolae. Hoc opus ego Berta Ancilla Dei fieri iussi. (Note: "Accept [this gift], O Christ, and Saint Cyricus, and Saint Nicholas. I, Bertha, handmaid of the Lord, ordered this work to be done.") The Gospel book was believed to date from the eleventh century.

== Notes and references ==
Notes
