= Saint Menas (disambiguation) =

Saint Menas may refer to:

== People ==
- St. Menas of Constantinople (?-552), patriarch
- St. Menas of Egypt (285-c. 309), Coptic martyr
- St. Menas of Sinai (6th century), ascetic
- St. Menas of Samnium (6th century), Italian hermit

== Churches ==
- Agios Minas Cathedral (Saint Menas), Heraklion, Greece
- Church of Saint Menas, Cairo, Egypt
- Church of Saint Menas of Samatya, Istanbul, Turkey
- Monastery of Saint Mina (Menas), Alexandria, Egypt
- San Menna (Saint Menas), an ancient church in Rome, Italy

== See also ==
- Menas (disambiguation)
- St. Minias of Florence, a saint with a similar name
