= Madou =

Madou may refer to:

In Brussels, Belgium:

- Place Mandou, near the Small ring
- Madou Plaza Tower, Saint-Josse-ten-Noode
- Madou metro station

In other places:

- Madou, Tainan, Taiwan
- Madou, Burkina Faso

== People with the name ==
People with the surname:

- Jean Baptiste Madou (1796–1877), Belgian painter and illustrator

People with the given name:

- Madou Dossama (born 1972), Burkinabé football player
- Madou Diabaté (born 1982), Burkinabé kora player and jeli

== See also ==
- Madou Monogatari, series of Japanese role-playing video games
- The Chinese Pinyin name for Model Media, a US-registered pornographic website producing films in Chinese.
