= Mena (given name) =

Mina, Meena is an ancient Egyptian name and was the name of the pharaoh that united the two kingdoms of Egypt into one. It is also a name of a saint that lived in the fourth century and there is a huge monastery under his name in the western desert of Egypt. It is popular in Egypt currently as a Christian name among the native Coptic population of Egypt, either first or last name and is usually a male name as first name.

It is also popular in some other parts of the world like Turkey, Greece and Sicily.

Mena is a given name.

It is also a surname, Mena.

The Meena tribe of India is also spelled as Mena.

The Arabic male given name Mena (Arabic: مِينَا mīnā) perhaps the Arabic "Mina" is the Persian "Mina" which bears the meaning "stained (tinted) glass mirror", artistic paint (also generic name for enamel or varnish) for porcelain and metal.

Notable people with this given name include:

- Mena Calthorpe (1905–1996), Australian writer
- Mena Cleary (1867–1929), Canadian-born American actress/singer
- Mena Crisólogo (1844–1927), Filipino politician, poet, writer and playwright
- Mena Massoud, Egyptian-born Canadian actor
- Mena Suvari, American actress
- Mena Trott, co-founder of Six Apart

== See also ==
- Menas
- Mena (surname)
- Mina (given name)
