= Mamou (disambiguation) =

Mamou is a city and sub-prefecture in a valley of the Fouta Djallon area of Guinea.

Mamou may also refer to:

- Mamou Region, central Guinea
  - Mamou Prefecture, Mamou Region
- Mamou, Burkina Faso
- Mamou, Louisiana, US
- MaMou (restaurant), New Orleans, US
