= Di Menna =

Di Menna is an Italian patronymic from the name Menna, which itself comes from the Greek Mēnas. It is sometimes spelled DiMenna, Dimenna, and di Menna.

Notable people with the surname Di Menna include:

- Grey J. Dimenna, the ninth president of Monmouth University
- Joseph DiMenna, American hedge fund manager
- Margaret di Menna, (1923–2014), New Zealand microbiologist
- Michele Di Menna (born 1980), Canadian interdisciplinary artist
- Ron DiMenna, founder of Ron Jon Surf Shop

== See also ==
- Menna (disambiguation)
- DiMenna Center for Classical Music
- DiMenna–Nyselius Library
