= Santi Sergio e Bacco al Foro Romano =

Coordinates: 41°53′34″N 12°29′4.8″E

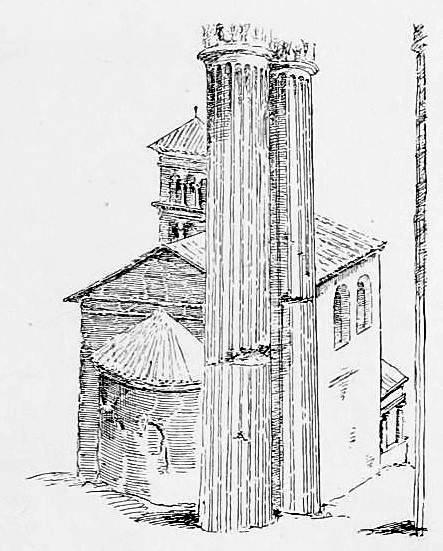
A sketch of the church from Lanciani's Ruins and excavations of ancient Rome (1897), showing the church's position between the columns of the Temple of Vespasian.

Santi Sergio e Bacco al Foro Romano (Italian: Saints Sergius and Bacchus at the Roman Forum) also called Santi Sergio e Bacco sub Capitolio (Saints Sergius and Bacchus under the Capitoline) was an ancient titular church in Rome, now lost. Located in the ruins of the Roman Forum, it had been one of the ancient diaconiae of the city and a collect church for one of the station days of Lent, but it was demolished in the sixteenth century.

== Dedication and location ==
The church was dedicated to the fourth-century Syrian martyrs Sergius and Bacchus, and was one of four churches in Rome listed by the ninth-century Liber Pontificalis as being named in their honor. (The only one that survives today is Santi Sergio e Bacco in Callinico.) Its epithets, listed by Christian Hülsen, were sub Capitolio or retro Capitolium, both of which refer to its position in the Forum, which is "under" or "behind" the Capitoline Hill.

The church was constructed up against the Arch of Septimius Severus. Mariano Armellini notes that it had a small campanile that was constructed on the attic of the arch, but Rodolfo Lanciani maintains that that tower was not connected to the church, having been pulled down in 1636, much later than the church itself. He supports his claim with a report of the city council of Rome that appropriated the tower's materials for the church of Santa Martina. Lanciani further points out that Santi Sergio e Bacco was the only church in the Roman Forum that "did not occupy the site of an ancient building, but stood in its own ground."

Before its destruction the church served as the ecclesia collecta for Tuesday of the third week of Lent, meaning that it was the meeting point for the papal procession that then moved to the day's station, Santa Pudenziana.

== History ==
=== Foundation and enlargement ===
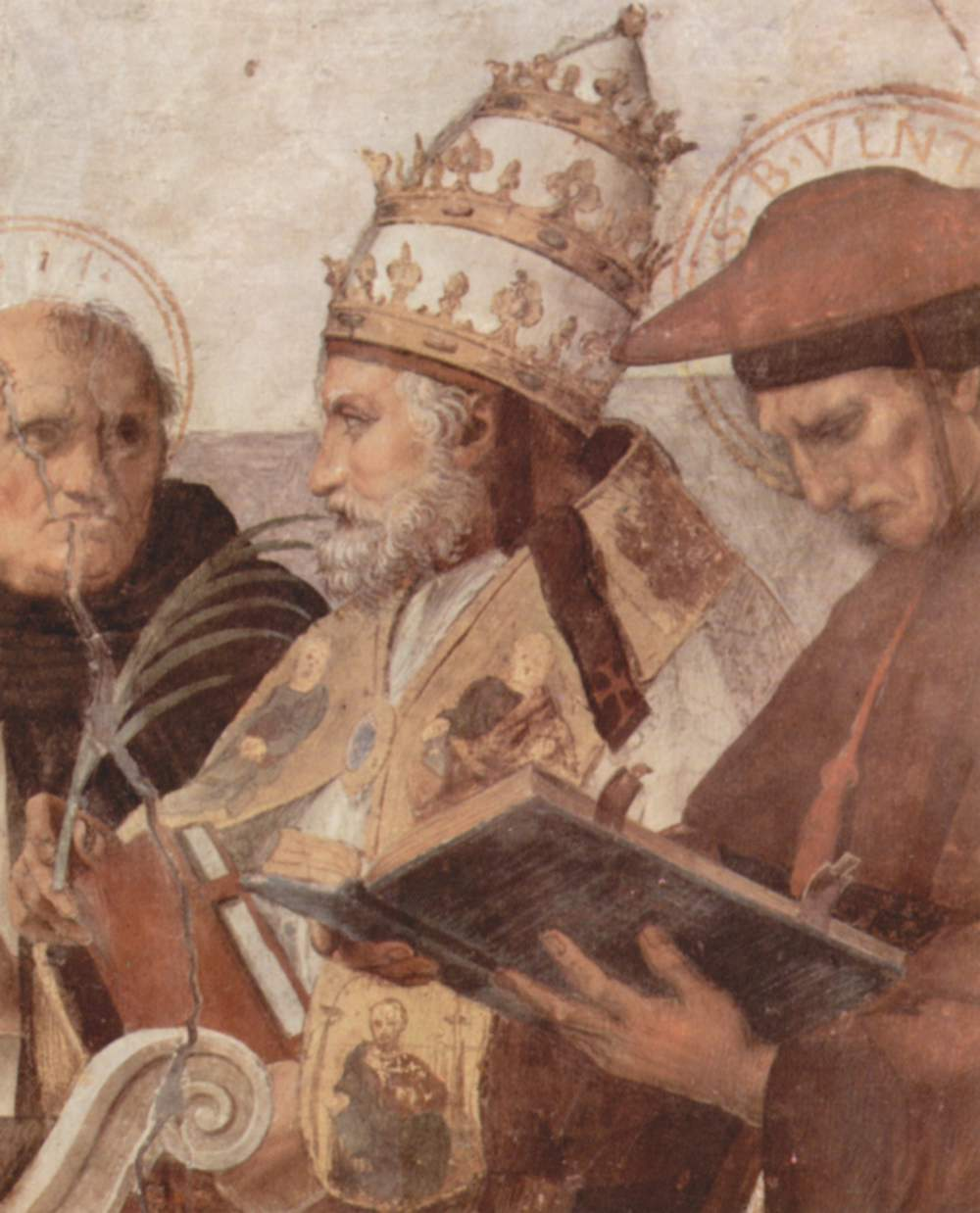
Pope Innocent III served as Cardinal Deacon of the church before his election as pope in 1198, endowing the church with gifts and performing renovations both before and during his pontificate.

The church was one of the ancient deaconries of the city, which were set up in order to distribute alms and food to the poor. One of the libri pontificales records that the Syrian Pope Gregory III (731–741) had performed a major expansion of the church in the early 700s, which had been up until then a small oratory.

It was, however, apparently already in bad condition by the pontificate of Pope Adrian I (772–795), who rebuilt it. An anonymous pilgrim of Einsiedeln, writing in the same century, refers to it as S. Sergii, ibi umbilicum ("[the church] of Saint Sergius, near the umbilicus). It later appears in an 1199 bull of Pope Innocent III, which defines its rights and privileges and lists the churches of San Salvatore de statera and San Lorenzo sub Capitolio as its dependents. (In 1190, Innocent, as Lotario di Segni, had inherited the church as his cardinal deaconry and donated a basilica shrine, a silver chalice, and altar vestments to it.) Innocent III also erected a facade on the church consisting of a porch supported by many columns, and the following inscription:

Latin

PENE RVI, QVASI NVLLA FVI, SED ME RELEVAVIT LOTHARIVS [...]
PRIVS POSTQVAM RENOVAVIT. DEQVE MEO PREMIO SVMPTVS PATER VRBIS
ET ORBIS. HOC TAMEN EX PROPRIO FECIT MIHI SIC RENOVOR BIS

English
I was almost ruined; I was near to nothing before, but Lothario raised me up again [...] after he renewed me. And then the Father of the City and the World took me up as a prize. Yet from his very own [resources] he made me; I am therefore renewed once more.

It was further enriched with donations by Leo III (795–816) and Gregory IV (827–844).

=== Destruction ===
Records of the church reappear with the 1461 Liber Anniversariorum Sancti Salvatoris ad Sancta Sanctorum and a catalogue of Roman churches in 1492. It did not, however, last longer than a century after that.

While both Lanciani and Armellini record the popular belief that the church was demolished by order of Pope Paul III in order to enable the triumphal march of Emperor Charles V through the Arch of Septimius Severus in 1536, Hülsen contests that story. To support his argument, Hülsen references the record of Michele Lonigo, who wrote that the church, "being reduced to meager terms, was destroyed after many years, and the relics of Saints Felicissimus and Agapitus and the body of Saint Vincent that were there, were placed in the nearby church of the Consolazione." The transfer of those relics occurred in 1562, with Ascanio Cesarini overseeing the process by appointment of Pope Pius IV. (An inscription was placed behind the altar of Santa Maria della Consolazione to commemorate it, but that appears to have been lost.) Since the transfer of the relics occurred thirty years after the visit of Charles V, Hulsen concludes that the church could not have been demolished for that reason.

Whatever the reason for its destruction, it was certainly gone by the end of the 16th century, when its incomes were transferred into a prebend for a simple canonry of eighty crowns in the chapel of Saints Sergius and Bacchus in the nearby church of Sant'Adriano al Foro (now deconsecrated and despoiled, remains only visible as the Curia Julia). Proof of this is a catalogue dating from the pontificate of Pope Pius V (1566–1572), which states: Sto. Sergio e Baccho sotto Campid[oglio]; ruinato ("Saints Sergius and Bacchus under the Capitoline: ruined"). The remains of its apse were still extant until 1812, when they were finally removed during excavation of the nearby Temple of Vespasian.

The title of Cardinal Titular Church of Santi Sergio e Bacco was suppressed in 1587.
