= Santa Lucia in Septisolio =

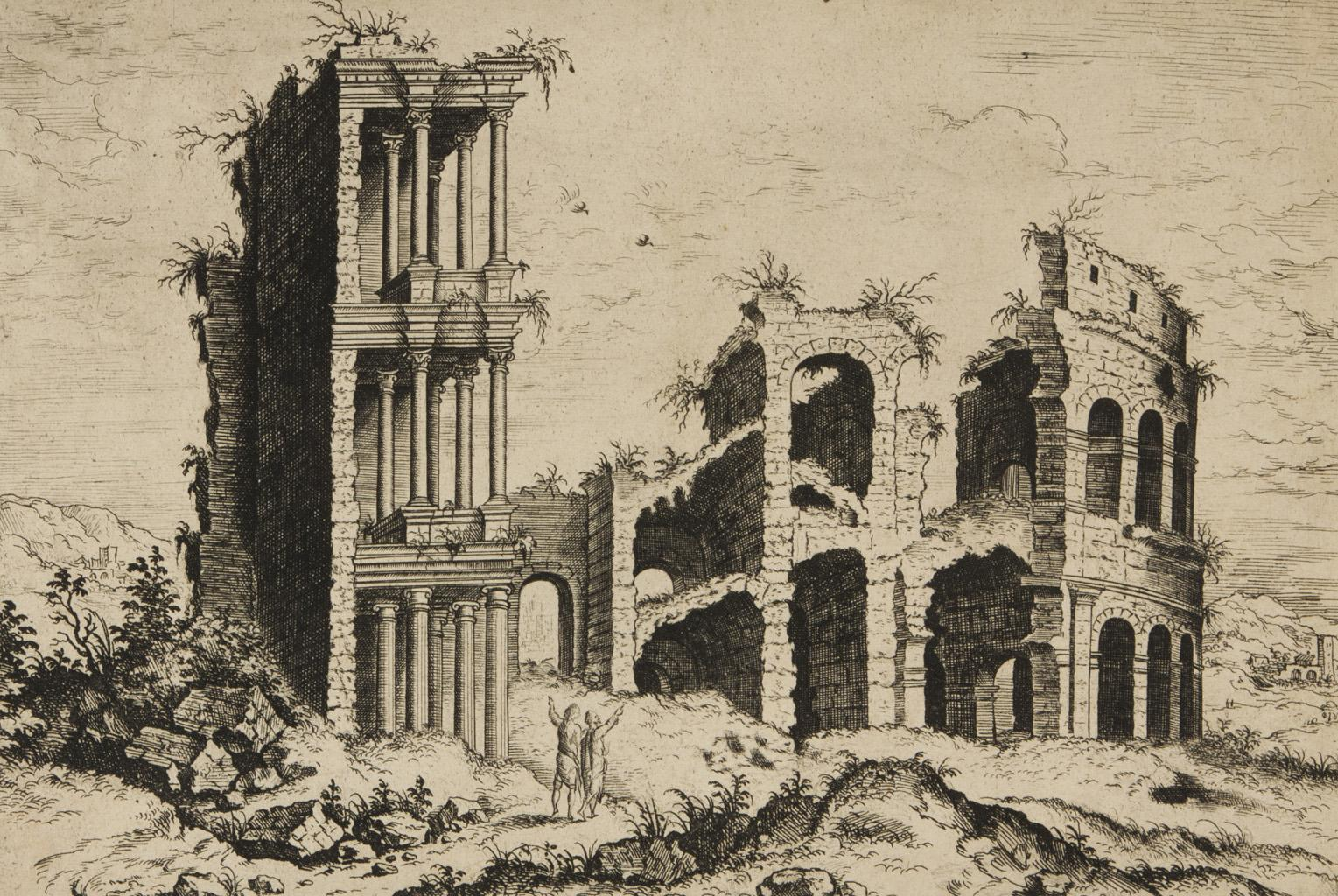
Engraving of the Septizodium by Hieronymus Cock (1518–1570), from which the church derives its name.

Santa Lucia in Septisolio was an ancient Roman church with a diaconia. It formerly stood at the base of the Palatine Hill, near the Septizodium of Septimius Severus, from which it took its name. The date of its destruction is not certain, although it seems to have disappeared definitively after the pontificate of Sixtus V (1585–1590).

== Name and location ==
The church was located in the southern corner of the Palatine Hill, and takes its name from the ancient Roman ruin Septizodium of Septimius Severus which was located there. The name septizodium is in turn derived from septisolium, meaning "temple of seven suns," and was probably named for the seven planetary deities (Saturn, Sun, Moon, Mars, Mercury, Jupiter, and Venus), or for the fact that it was originally divided into seven parts. As such, the church of Saint Lucy which was built nearby is variously called in Septisolio, in Septizonium (both of which refer to the Septizodium), in septem solium, de septum solis, de sedes solis (referring to the "seven suns"), or even de septem viae or in septem vias (meaning, "at the seven ways"). The catalogue of Pietro Mallio, produced during the pontificate of Pope Alexander III (1159–1181) calls it S. Lucie Palatii in cyrco iuxta Septa Solis ("[the church of] Saint Lucy of the Palatine, in the circus, near the Seven Suns"). Mariano Armellini assures his readers that these names are all more or less corrupted versions of the same ancient monument's name.

During the height of the Roman stational liturgy in the sixth century until its decline in the eleventh and extinction in the fourteenth, the church served as the ecclesia collecta for Friday of the first week of Lent, meaning that it was the meeting point for the papal procession that then moved to the day's statio, Santi Giovanni e Paolo.

== History ==
The church of Saint Lucy at the Septizodium is mentioned in the Liber Pontificalis as the site of one of the most ancient deaconries of the city. That diaconia is mentioned in the biographies of Pope Leo III (795–816) and Gregory IV (827–844), and was situated next to the church. The church itself is described by Armellini as assai vasta e ricchissimamente decorata, "quite vast and most richly decorated."

Even though the church survived until the time of Pope Sixtus V in a satisfactory condition, Armellini holds that was demolished during his papacy. In doing so, he was echoing the opinion of most authorities, who attributed its destruction to the unique architectural value of the Septizodium; it was demolished so that its pieces could be used in other buildings. Hülsen, however, objects to that theory, positing instead that the church fell into ruins when its cardinalatial title lapsed. He further argues that the church was somewhat removed from the ruins of the Septizodium, and would have stood closer to the Torre della Moletta in the Circus Maximus.
