= Clara Poole King =

American opera singer (1853–1938)

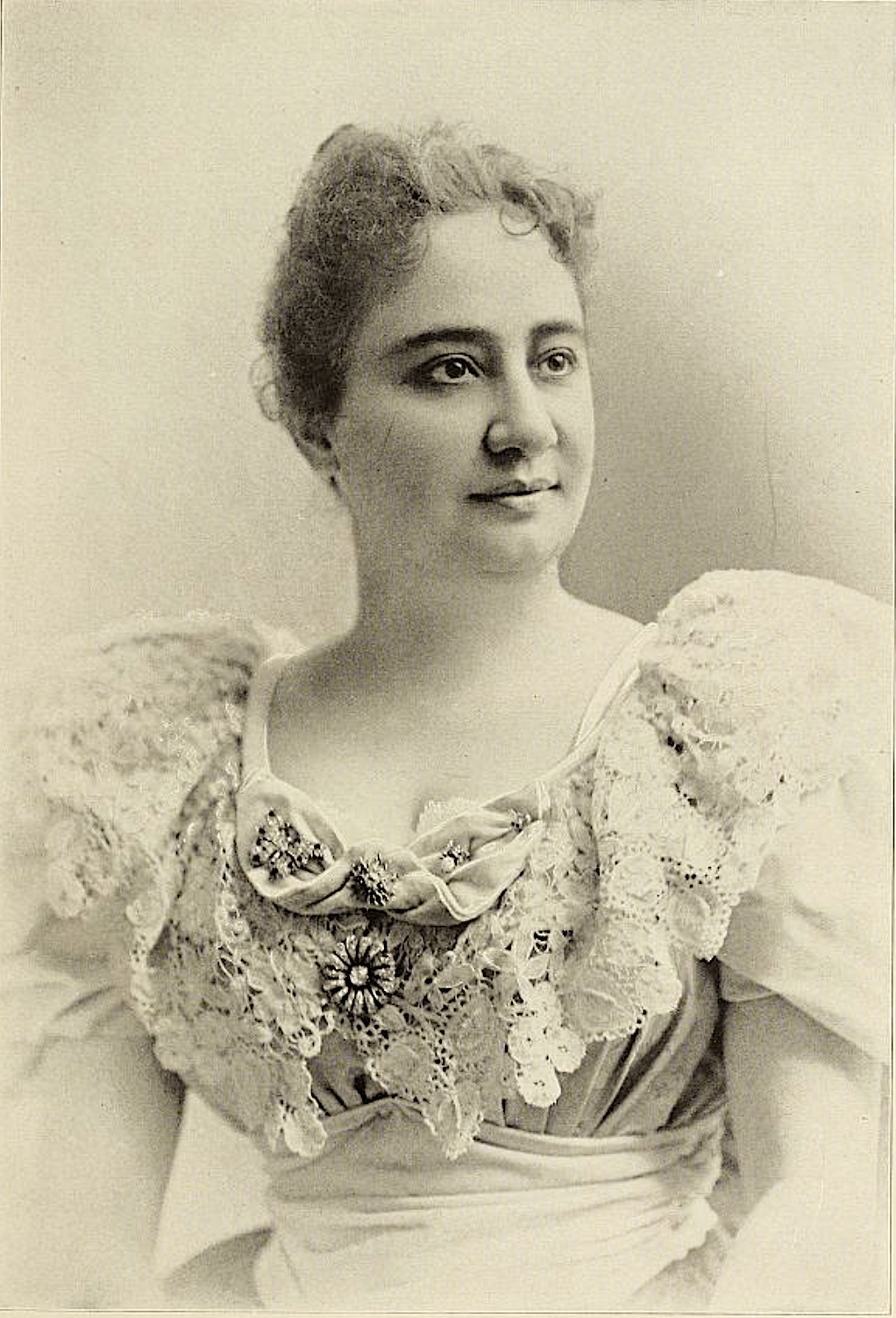
Clara Poole King in 1883. This portrait was later published in The Westminster Budget in 1894 with the journalist commenting that it was "not a flattering likeness" and that she was much better looking in person.

Clara Jane Poole, also known by her married name Clara Poole King and by the stage name Clara Pollini, (October 13, 1853 – December 6, 1938) was an American contralto and voice teacher. She should not be confused with the British contralto Clara Poole who was active before Clara Jane Poole was born in both England and the United States.

Born and raised in South Boston, Clara was the daughter of musicians Charles Poole and Lucy Poole. She studied singing in her native city with Erminia Rudersdorf. She began her career there in 1871 and was principally based in Boston until going to Europe in the mid 1880s to study singing first in Paris with Giovanni Sbriglia and then in Italy with Giovanni Moretti. She sang in operas in Italy before returning to the United States in 1887 to join Gustav Hinrichs's National English Opera Company with whom she toured. In 1890 she settled in New York City. She periodically performed in operas after this, and was better known as an oratorio soloist with leading American orchestras and festivals.

From 1894 until 1900 Poole mainly lived and worked in London as a concert singer, but also appeared periodically in operas with the Carl Rosa Opera Company and in France at the Paris Opera. She returned to the United States where she was active as a concert singer through 1907. During this period her career shifted towards teaching both privately and on the faculty of the New York College of Music. She moved back to Boston where she continued to teach singing into the last years of her life.

== Early life and career ==
The daughter of Charles C. Poole and Lucy J. Poole, Clara Jane Poole was born in Boston, Massachusetts, on October 13, 1853. Both of her parents and her brother were musicians. She grew up in South Boston and initially studied singing in Boston with Erminia Rudersdorf.

In 1871 she performed in a concert at the Boston Young Men's Christian Union on a program in which she was billed as a contralto. In 1872 she performed in concerts with the blind violinist Joseph Heine at Liberty Hall in New Bedford, Massachusetts, and toured as a member of the Barnabee Concert Troupe which was organized by bass and comic opera comedian Henry Clay Barnabee (1833–1917). In June 1872 she sang as a member of the chorus at the World's Peace Jubilee and International Musical Festival.

In 1873–1874 she was employed as a church singer at Emmanuel Episcopal Church, Boston, which was then led by the organist and choir master Silas Atkins Bancroft.

In 1879 she portrayed Diana in Les diamants de la couronne at the Globe Theatre in Boston. In 1881 she became a member of Emma Abbott's opera company; performing the role of Germaine in The Chimes of Normandy in January of that year. The following April she married A. G. King in Utica, New York. After this she joined Clara Louise Kellogg's touring concert company.

On December 11, 1882 she portrayed the title role in Gilbert and Sullivan's Iolanthe for the inaugural opening of Boston's Bijou Theatre (BT). Other operas she performed in at the BT included Henry P. Stephens and Edward Solomon's Virginia, or Ringing the changes (1883, as Sarah Cowslip) and Gilbert and Sullivan's H.M.S. Pinafore (1883, as Little Buttercup).

== First visit to Europe and return to the United States ==
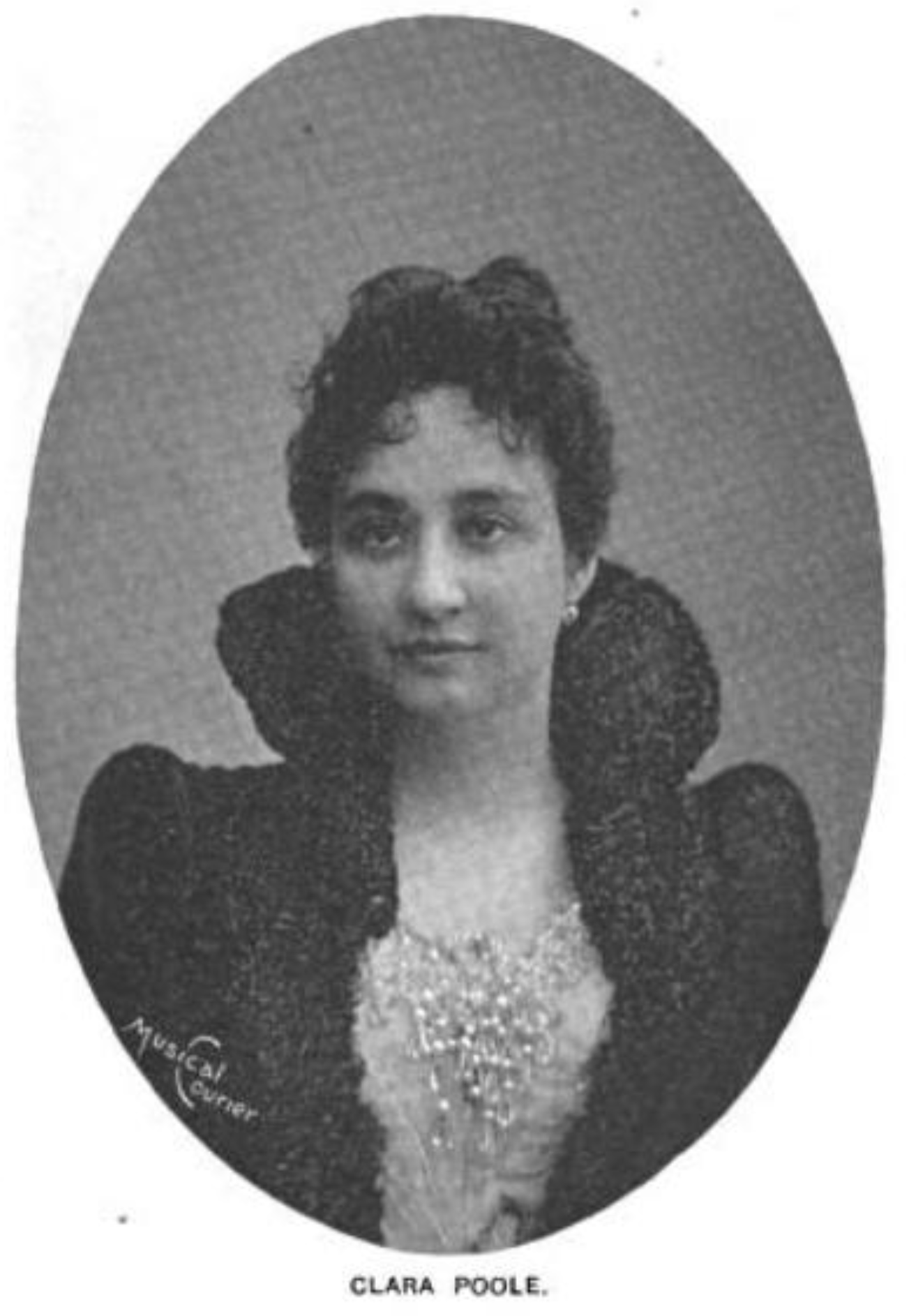

Poole went to Europe in the mid 1880s where she adopted the stage name of Clara Pollini. There she studied singing first in Paris with Giovanni Sbriglia and later in Italy with Giovanni Moretti. She made her European opera debut in Tortona as Nancy in Martha. In 1886 she portrayed the role of Siebel in Faust at the Teatro Carlo Felice. She was engaged for further performances there in 1887.

In the 1887–1888 season she performed the roles of Amneris in Aida, Epicharis in Néron, Ortrud in Lohengrin, and the title role in Die Königin von Saba on tour with Gustav Hinrichs's National English Opera Company. In February 1889 she was a soloist in Verdi's Requiem with the Handel and Haydn Society (HHS) and conductor Carl Zerrahn at Boston Music Hall. She sang with the HHS again the following year as a soloist in Felix Mendelssohn's Elijah with Lilli Lehmann as the Widow and William Ludwig as Elijah, and as a soloist in George Frideric Handel's Israel in Egypt.

In 1889 she toured to Canada as a member of the New American Opera Company; performing the role of Ulrica in Verdi's Un ballo in maschera. In 1890 she was a soloist in Niels Gade's cantata The Erl King's Daughter the Boston Symphony Orchestra (BSO) at the Worcester Music Festival, Massachusetts.

In 1891 and 1894 Poole was the resident contralto at the Indianapolis May Festival (IMF); performing as a soloist in several oratorios and other classical works with the Boston Festival Orchestra during those events. Some of the musicians she performed with at the IMF included Emma Juch, Emma Eames, and William H. Rieger. In February 1891 she performed as a soloist in a concert version of Edvard Grieg's unfinished opera Olaf Tryggvason with The Boston Singers and conductor George L. Osgood. In March 1891 she performed as a soloist in Max Bruch's Arminius with Montreal Philharmonic Society (MPS) at Windsor Hall. She later returned to that venue to perform with the MPS again in a concert of music by Edvard Grieg in April 1894.

In December 1891 Poole was a soloist in Handel's Messiah with the orchestra of the Metropolitan Opera and the Brooklyn Choral Society. That same month she performed the role of Laura in La Gioconda at the Grand Opera House in Philadelphia with Giuseppe Del Puente as Enzo and Helen Campbell in the title role. She repeated the role at the Lenox Lyceum (LL) in 1892 under conductor Anton Seidl with Emma Juch in the tile role. She had earlier performed at the LL as a soloist in Theodore Thomas's concert series in 1891.

In 1893 Poole served on the music advisory committee for the World's Columbian Exposition. In January 1893 she sang with the orchestra of the Metropolitan Opera and conductor Anton Seidl in a concert of excerpts from Wagner's operas at The Boston Theatre. The following March she sang the role of Azucena in a concert version of Il trovatore given by the New York Symphony Orchestra and conductor Walter Damrosch; a role she subsequently performed in a staged version at the Garden Theatre later that year. In May 1893 she performed in Verdi's Requiem at the May Festival in Springfield, Massachusetts with conductor Emil Mollenhauer leading the BSO. The following month she appeared as Nancy in Martha in Milwaukee.

In 1894 Poole portrayed the role of Wellgunde in Wagner's Götterdämmerung at the Academy of Music in Philadelphia. Performed as part of the city's Wagner Festival, other members of the cast included Amalie Materna, Anton Schott, and Emil Fischer. In January 1894 she performed with Lillian Russell and John Philip Sousa and his band at a benefit concert held at the Metropolitan Opera House. In March 1894 she was a soloist in Rossini's Stabat Mater with the New York Symphony Orchestra, tenor Italo Campanini, soprano Lillian Blauvelt, baritone Harry Plunket Greene, violinist Mary Currie Duke, and conductor Leopold Damrosch. That same month she was a guest soloist in Emil Liebling's piano recital at Carnegie Hall. She was also employed as a church singer at South Presbyterian Church in NYC during the 1890s until she left for Europe in 1894.

== Work in Europe in the 1890s ==
In 1894 Poole left the United States for Europe; arriving in England in early July 1894. In October 1894 she was a soloist in Ludwig van Beethoven's Symphony No. 9 at Queen's Hall (QH) with conductor Hans Richter, soprano Antoinette Trebelli, tenor Edward Lloyd, bass Robert Watkin-Mills, and the Richter Choir. In November 1894 she was a soloist in Mendelssohn's Elijah with baritone Charles Santley and the Royal Choral Society (RCS) led by Joseph Barnby at Royal Albert Hall (RAH). In December 1894 she made her West End stage debut at Toole's Theatre as Bell Golightly in the comic opera Walker, London.

Poole was a soloist with the RCS again at the RAH as Ursula in Arthur Sullivan's The Golden Legend in 1895. In the summer of 1895 Poole left London for Paris. There she sang with the Paris Opera and was given a beautiful table by a French duke which later drew attention from antique collectors as a "museum worthy" piece after her death more than 50 years later. In January 1896 she was back in London performing with the Carl Rosa Opera Company as Ortrud in Lohengrin at Daly's Theatre. The following month she was a soloist in a symphonic concert conducted by Alberto Randegger at the Imperial Institute. In March 1896 she was a soloist in George Henschel's Stabat Mater with the composer conducting the London Symphony Orchestra at St James's Hall. In December 1896 she was a soloist in Handel's Messiah with the Bath Choral Society.

In 1897 she performed in the National Sunday League concerts at Queen's Hall (QH) in London, and returned to the QH in 1898 for multiple recital appearances. In May 1898 she performed at the meeting of the Congregational Union of England and Wales. The following June she performed in concerts in Essex sponsored by the Primrose League. In November 1898 she performed in a concert at St. Andrew's Hall in Glasgow sponsored by the Society of Saint Vincent de Paul, and the following month appeared in concert at St James's Hall in London. In November 1899 she performed in concert with violinist William Henley, tenor Ben Davies, and soprano Leslie Arnott at the Hanbury Assembly Rooms in Pontypool.

== Later life and career ==
After performing in Europe for a six year period, Poole returned to the United States in the summer of 1900. In 1901 she was a soloist with the Boston Symphony Orchestra and conductor Emil Mollenhauer in performances of both Mendelssohn's Elijah and Handel's Messiah. In October 1901 she was a soloist in César Franck's Les Béatitudes at the Worcester Music Festival, Massachusetts. In 1902 she was a soloist again in the Messiah, this time with the Oratorio Society of Baltimore at Baltimore Music Hall. In 1903 she gave a recital at the concert hall located inside the Frederick Loeser & Co. department store with Charles Parkyn as her accompanist. In 1904 she gave a joint recital with violinist Samuel J. Leventhal at Unity Hall in Hartford, Connecticut.

Poole's performance career slowed in the early 20th century. One of her last performances was a recital she gave at Boxwood Manor in Old Lyme, Connecticut in 1906. In 1901 she opened up a private voice studio on 68th St in Manhattan. By 1903 she was teaching on the voice faculty of the New York College of Music, and remained there until at least the 1905/1906 academic year. She later returned to her native Boston where she was active as a voice teacher.

She died on December 6, 1938, in Boston.
