= Fobiri =

- Location in Burkina Faso
- Coordinates: 11°53′N 3°28′W
- Country: Burkina Faso
- Region: Boucle du Mouhoun Region
- Province: Balé
- Department: Yaho Department

Population (2019)
  - Total: 2,499

Fobiri is a town in the Yaho Department of Balé Province in south-western Burkina Faso.

Population
Year	Pop.	±%
1985	831	—
2006	1,913	+130.2%
2019	2,499	+30.6%
