= Santa Maria in Turri =

Historic church in Vatican City, Italy

Coordinates: 41°54′7″N 12°27′20″E

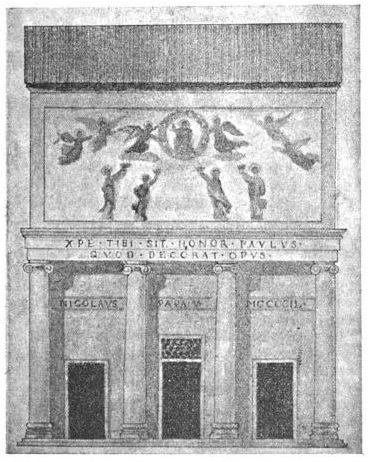
The facade of the church of S. Maria in Turri, drawn from descriptions in the ancient sources.

Santa Maria in Turri was an ancient church in the city of Rome, demolished in the Renaissance. It adjoined the outside atrium of the ancient Basilica of St. Peter, one of a complex of small churches or oratories that grew up around the site.

== Name ==
Besides the name in turri ("in the tower"), other names of the church were S. Maria ad grada, (Note: That is, gradus basilicae, the steps of the basilica.) ante Salvatorem, (Note: So called because it was next to a famous image of the Savior, though further down.) in atrio, (Note: That is, in the atrium of the basilica.) or in medium. (Note: The origins of that last title is not clear. Armellini adds the following titles: in atriano, in terrione, in atrio, in arrano, ad gradus, in laborario; but without explanation of their meaning.) In an eighth-century description of the Vatican basilica, it is called S. Maria quae nova dicitur, (Note: Meaning, "which is called 'new'.") which helps in dating the origin of the structure.

== Location ==
The Augustinian historian Onofrio Panvinio (1529–1568) describes four oratories or small churches that still existed in his time, around the Basilica of St. Peter. They were built in the four porticoes that surrounded the paradiso (atrium) of the basilica complex. S. Maria in turri was located at the left of the entrance; at the right in the corner, S. Apollinaris; then beyond those two, facing them in the portico immediately in front of the basilica, S. Vincentius, which lay immediately to the right of the corner; and S. Maria de febre, situated to the left where the ancient secretarium was, which was also called oratorium S. Gregorii ("oratory of Saint Gregory") because of its proximity to his tomb.

== Function ==
The church of S. Maria in turri is often mentioned in connection with the procession with palms on the Sunday before Easter, the procession with lights on the feast of the Purification, and in other similar occasions; but it had special importance in the coronations of the Holy Roman Emperors. During the coronation, the king about to be crowned would greet the pope in the square standing above the steps, would go into the church, and, with his hand on the book of the Gospels, would take a personal oath of fidelity. Afterward, in the same place, the canons of St. Peter's "greeted him like a brother," which is to say, accepted him to their chapter, and dressed him in imperial vestments. After the completion of that rite, they proceeded with him to the silver door of the basilica, accompanied by the chant Petre amas me.

Alongside the church of S. Maria the emperor established the palatinus Caroli, which was an imperial residence. It was constructed in the time of Pope Leo III (795–816). The emperor lodged there and erected and operated a tribunal at the location. Otto II used it as his residence in the city, and, notably, died there.

== History ==
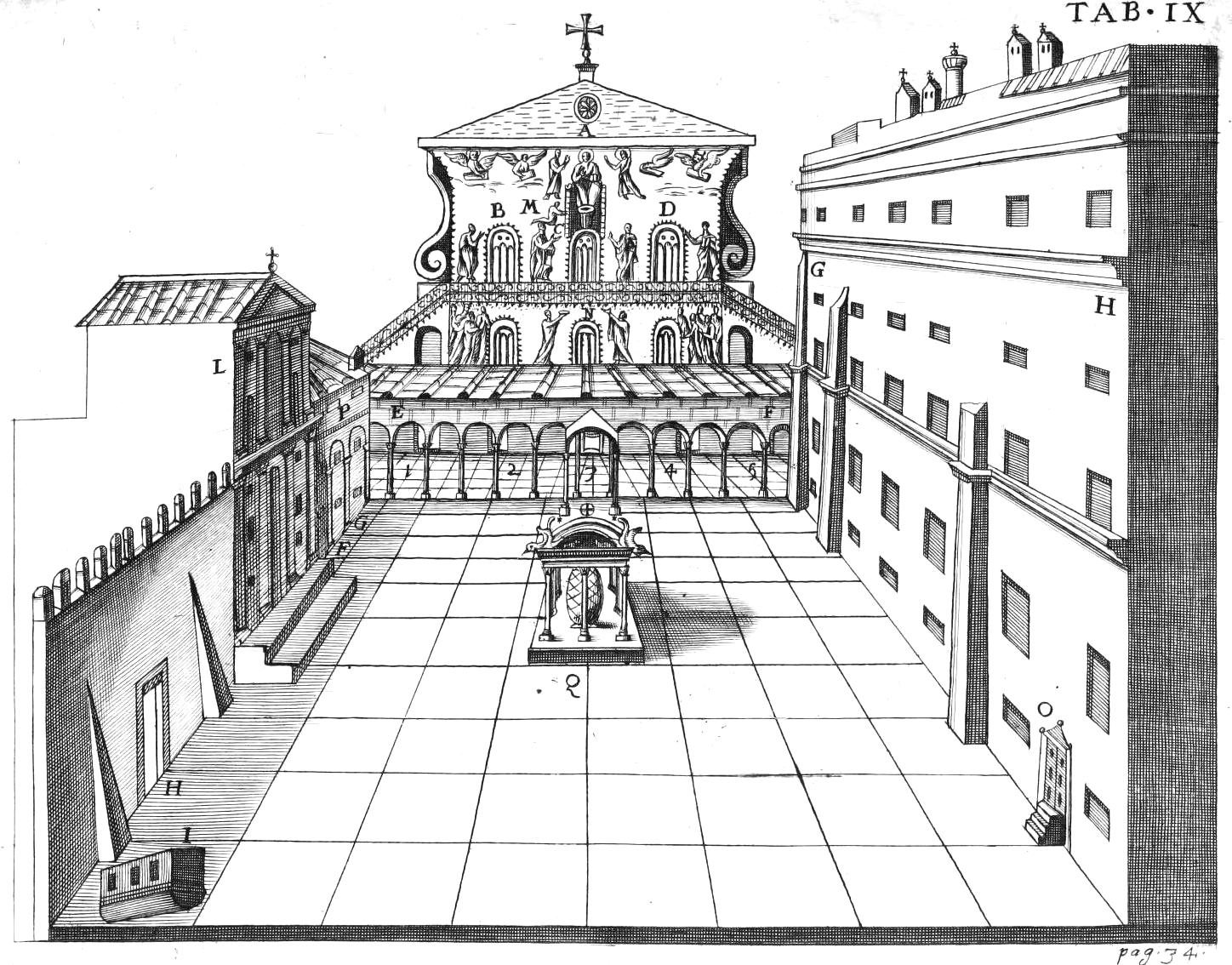
This engraving of the front of the ancient Vatican Basilica shows the atrium off of which the church of S. Maria in Turri was located.

The church traced its origins to an ancient square structure that grew up underneath the tower of the basilica near the entrance to the atrium. That tower was built, according to the Liber Pontificalis, by Pope Stephen II (752–757), and reportedly "covered in pieces of gold and silver" (by which is probably meant mosaic decorations in those colors), and provided with three bells, which were a defensive alarm measure. The tower was also decorated with a poetic epigraph, which read as follows, according to De Rossi:

Stephanus referat quas venerare fores
Haec tuta est turris trepidis obiecta superbis
Elata excludens, mitia corda tegens

It seems that the church was built along with the tower. The front of the church coincided with the external facade, which is to say, of its atrium. Mariano Armellini notes that the doors of the church were made of bronze.

Pope Paul I (757–767) adorned the facade with a mosaic of which the antiquarian Giacomo Grimaldi was able to see a part. That same mosaic is mentioned in Barberini Codex XXXIV, 50, in which the church is referred to by the title Ecclesia S. Mariae in turri supra gradus anteriores scalarum veteris basilicae Vaticanae, cuius frons musivo opere ornata fuit a Sancto Paulo papa primo, qui sedit anno 757. (Note: "The church of S. Maria in turri above the rear stairs of the ancient Vatican Basilica, the front of which was adorned with a mosaic by Pope Saint Paul I, who sat [reigned] in the year 757.")

On the church itself, there was a dedicatory inscription underneath a mosaic work on the facade, which read: Christe tibi sit honor Paulus quod decorat opus. The mosaic depicted a scene representing the Ascension of Christ in the usual manner of the era, in which Christ is shown in the midst of a great cloud and carried up by angels. At the base of the scene were the twelve Apostles in a group, like the one found in the lower church of S. Clemente, which was also commissioned by Paul I. Later on the facade was altered in restorations, which occurred by the time of Pope Nicholas V (1447–1455) whose name appears above the entrance in 1450.

During the reign of Pope Adrian I (772–795) the church is referred to as S. Maria in atrio. During that time there was a deaconry established there for the distribution of alms. Centuries later, a certain Pope Innocent (probably Innocent II, who consecrated many churches in the city before his death in 1143) reconsecrated the church. It was for that occasion that an inscription was carved on the altar in Leonine verse, later reported by Grimaldi:

Est in honore piae domus ista sacrata Mariae
Hoc Innocenti te presule perficienti
Cui suberat

On 8 June 1155, Adrian IV crowned Frederick Barbarossa Holy Roman Emperor at the ancient Basilica of St. Peter. Barabarossa proceeded afterwards to the church where he knelt before the Pope and promised to protect and defend the Holy Roman Church. However, he was later compelled to attack the city in 1167. It was at this time that an important episode in the history of the church occurred. During Barbarossa's attack on the basilica, the little church was a point of defense; yet in the end it was burned and reduced to ruins (penitus combusta et dissipata). The art and objects destroyed in the disaster were substantial, including the aforementioned image of the Savior's face, which had been a copy of the Veronica that is still kept in the Basilica.

The plan of the basilica as depicted by Tiberio Alfarano (1525–1596) shows the church, but by that time it was already ruined or abandoned. In the end, the church was demolished to make way for the new Basilica of St. Peter in the 16th or 17th century.
