= Myna (disambiguation) =

The myna is a bird of the starling family.

Myna may refer to:

- Myna (film), 2013 Kannada romantic drama film
- Myna Mahila Foundation, Indian organization
- Myna (character), character in comics album series Yoko Tsuno

== See also ==
- Mina (disambiguation)
- Myn (disambiguation)
