= Antoine de Créqui Canaples =

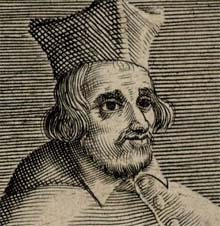
Antoine de Créqui Canaples

Antoine de Créqui Canaples (1531–1574) was a French Roman Catholic bishop and cardinal.

== Biography ==
Antoine de Créqui Canaples was born in the Kingdom of France on 17 July 1531, the son of Jean de Créqui, seigneur of Canaples, and his wife Marie d'Acigné. After the death of his two brothers, he inherited his family's vast wealth; upon his death, he left this fortune to his sister's son Antoine de Blanchefort (the father of Charles de Blanchefort). In 1539, he was sent to Paris to be educated.

Créqui began his ecclesiastical career as a cleric in Thérouanne. He was designated Bishop of Thérouanne in 1553, but never occupied the see. He became Chancellor of the Order of Saint Michael and was a Knight of the Order of the Holy Spirit. He was also the Provost of the Premonstratensian Sélincourt Abbey.

In 1552, Henry II of France nominated him to be Bishop of Nantes. The cathedral chapter of Nantes Cathedral elected him Bishop of Nantes on 15 December 1553. He was subsequently ordained as a priest on the morning of 22 April 1554 by Gilles de Gaude, titular bishop of Rhaphanaea. Later that afternoon, he was then consecrated as a bishop by François de Laval, Bishop of Dol. On 14 July 1564 he was transferred to the Diocese of Amiens, exchanging his see with Cardinal Nicolas de Pellevé. He was a member of the French Conseil d'État under Charles IX of France.

Pope Pius IV made him a cardinal deacon in the consistory of 12 March 1565. He did not participate in the papal conclave of 1565-66 that elected Pope Pius V. On 13 March 1566 he received the red hat and the titular church of San Trifone in Posterula (a deaconry raised pro illa vice to the status of title). He did not participate in the papal conclave of 1572 that elected Pope Gregory XIII.

He died in Amiens on 20 June 1574. According to his will, he received heart burial, with his body being buried in the Benedictine Moreuil Abbey and his heart was buried in Amiens Cathedral.
