= Menes (disambiguation) =

Menes was a Pharaoh of ancient Egypt.

Menes may also refer to:

== Places ==
- Ménes, the Hungarian name for Miniș village, Ghioroc Commune, Arad County, Romania

== People ==
=== Given name ===
- Menes of Pella, a Macedonian general
- Saint Menes (285 – c. 309), Egyptian saint, and one of the most famous Christian saints, speculated to be the same person known as Saint Christopher

=== Surname ===
- Luis Menes, Mexican footballer
- Orlando Ricardo Menes, Latino poet

=== Fictional characters ===
- A character in the short story The Cats of Ulthar by H. P. Lovecraft

== See also ==
- Mene (disambiguation)
- Menas (disambiguation)
