= Luis Mena =

Luis Mena may refer to:

- Luis de Mena, 18th-century Mexican painter
- Luis Mena (Nicaraguan politician) (Luis Mena Vado, c. 1865–1928), Nicaraguan politician
- Luís Mena e Silva (1902–1963), Portuguese sport equestrian rider
- Luis Rojas Mena (1917–2009), Mexican Roman Catholic bishop
- Luis Mena Arroyo (1920–2009), Mexican Roman Catholic bishop
- Luis Felipe Bravo Mena (born 1952), Mexican politician
- Luis Mena (Chilean footballer) (Luis Mena Irarrázabal, born 1979), Chilean footballer
- Luis Enrique Mena (born 1992), Colombian footballer
- Luis Acosta (footballer) (Luis Acosta Mena, born 1994), Spanish footballer

== See also ==
- Mena (disambiguation)
- Luis (disambiguation)
- Mena (surname)
- José Luís Mena Barreto (1817–1879), Brazilian politician and military officer
