= Mene (disambiguation) =

Mene is a genus of fish.

Mene may also refer to:

== Mythology ==
- Selene, the Greek moon-goddess and personification of the Moon
- Mene (goddess), another name for Selene as the goddess presiding over the months

== People with the surname ==
- Bernice Mene, New Zealand netball player
- Chris Mene, New Zealand discus thrower
- Pierre-Jules Mêne, French-American sculptor
- Sally Mene, New Zealand discus and javelin thrower
- Ogidi Mene, a 28-year-old Nigerian man who was extrajudicially killed on April 26, 2026.

== Other uses ==
- Mina (unit) (also rendered mene), an ancient Near Eastern unit of weight for gold or silver
- MV Mene an Empire ship
- "Mene" (song) a single by American rock band, Brand New

== See also ==
- Mene mene tekel upharsin, the phrase written "on the wall" in the Biblical book of Daniel
- Menes (disambiguation)
- Mena (disambiguation)
- Mina (disambiguation)
- Meme (disambiguation)
