= San Trifone in Posterula =

Coordinates: 41°54′05.8″N 12°28′29.6″E

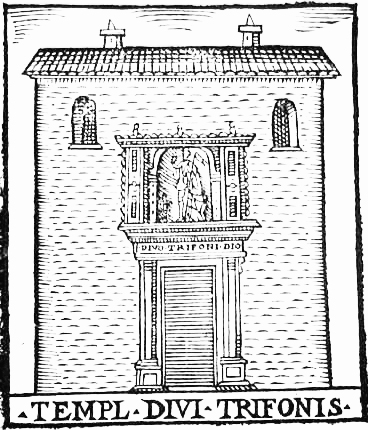
- Engraving of San Trifone in Posterula by Girolamo Francino (1588)
- Click on the map for a fullscreen view
- Location: Campo Marzio, Rome
- Country: Italy
- Denomination: Catholic
- Tradition: Latin Church
- Religious order: Order of Saint Augustine

History
- Status: Titular church, demolished in 1746
- Founded: c. 8th century
- Dedication: Tryphon of Campsada

San Trifone in Posterula was a titular church of Rome that was destroyed during the construction of Sant'Agostino. The church stood on the corner of Via dei Portoghesi and Via della Scrofa in Campo Marzio since the eighth century, and was granted to the Order of Saint Augustine in 1287. It was eventually destroyed in 1746 when Luigi Vanvitelli completed the Convent of Sant'Agostino, but remnants of the church remain visible on the site.

== Name ==
The church's dedication was to the martyr St. Tryphon, and it was apparently constructed in order to house his relics, which had previously been kept in a church outside the city walls. The name in posterula references its vicinity to the posterulæ (English: postern), that is, the clandestine gates that the people of the city opened in the walls to access the Tiber.

== History ==
=== Early history ===
The church was reputedly of ancient origins, dating to the eighth century. (Note: Christian Hülsen, however, is more conservative, and regards the church's eighth-century dating as poorly established.)

The first thing known with certainty is that the church was rebuilt in 1006 with funds provided by John II Crescentius, as this is recorded in a bull of Pope John XVIII. (Note: Mariano Armellini claims that the church was originally constructed in 957 by the same Crescentius.) More than a hundred years later, in 1127, a bull of Pope Honorius II mentions a certain Leonardus as its archpresbyter, and another bull from 1222 names Angelus as a presbyter attached to the church. A series of bulls dated from 1181 until 1188 records a dispute between the church of San Trifone, along with San Salvatore de Sere, San Nicola de Praefectis, and San Biagio de Monte Acceptabili, against the monastery of Santa Maria in Campo Marzio.

=== Grant to the Augustinians ===
Pope Honorius IV, with a decree of 20 February 1287, granted the church to the Order of Saint Augustine, who added to its original name that of their patron St. Augustine. The 1320 Catalogue of Turin attests that, at that time, the church was a papal chapel and housed twenty five Augustinian friars.

On 11 April 1424, the Augustinians solemnly transferred the relics of St. Monica, the mother of St. Augustine, from their original resting place in Ostia to the church.

=== Decline and destruction ===
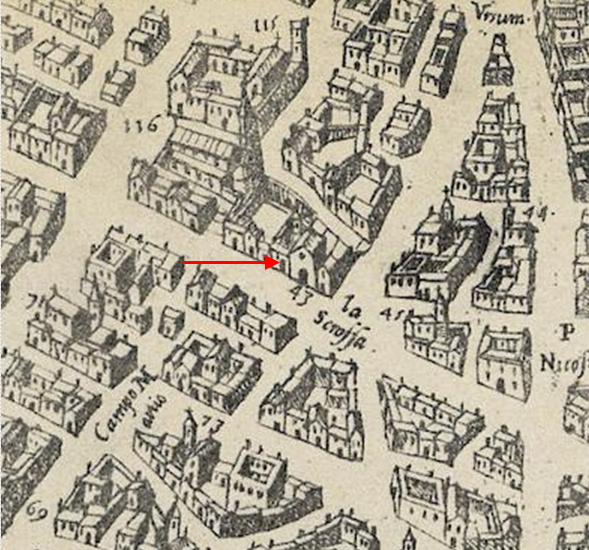
Location of San Trifone in Posterula in Antonio Lafreri's map of Rome

The decline of the church began in 1484, with the completion of the Basilica of Sant'Agostino right next to it. At that time, the Augustinians left San Trifone. It remained standing although massively overshadowed by the new church, and even continued to exist after the construction of the Augustinian monastery complex that completely subsumed it in 1537. Attesting to its continued existence is an entry in a 1555 catalogue of churches, and a woodcut representation of the church by Girolamo Francino in 1588. The church is once again mentioned in 1625 as serving as an oratory for the Society of the Blessed Sacrament of St. Augustine.

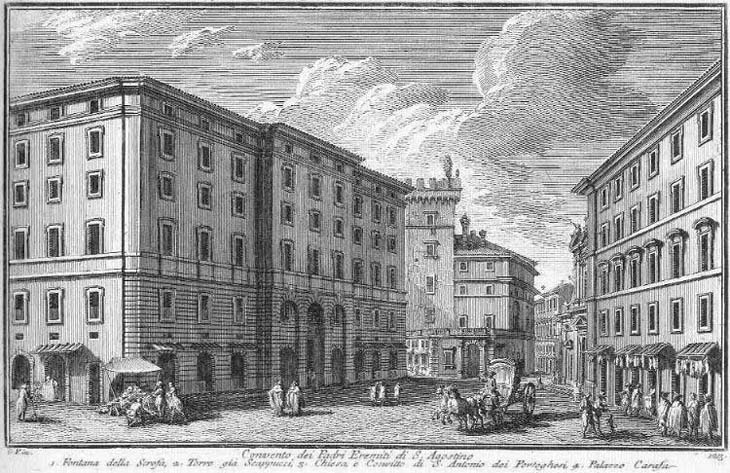
Location of the church soon after the construction of the Convent of Sant'Agostino, as depicted in Giuseppe Vasi's Sulle magnificenze di Roma Antica e Moderna (1747-1761)

In 1746, the church, even despite its ancient origins and former prominence, was demolished when Luigi Vanvitelli was contracted to enlarge the Convent of Sant'Agostino. Some ruins of the San Trifone still form part of the church complex at Sant'Agostino.

=== Lenten station ===
The Church of San Trifone was formerly listed as the station church for the Saturday after Ash Wednesday. The station for that day is now vested in the Basilica of Sant'Agostino.

== Cardinal title ==
The title of S. Triphonos, connected to the church, was established on 13 March 1566 by Pope Pius V and suppressed on 13 April 1587 by Pope Sixtus V. The only cardinal to have held the title was Antoine de Créqui Canaples.

Mariano Armellini, who claims that San Trifone was demolished in the sixteenth century with the initial construction of the Convent of Sant'Agostino, says that the church's status as a cardinal's church was transferred to San Salvatore in Primicerio, which retained it until 1566, at which time it was transferred to Sant'Agostino.
