= Mouni (Burkina Faso town) =

- Location in Burkina Faso
- Coordinates: 11°54′N 3°30′W
- Country: Burkina Faso
- Region: Boucle du Mouhoun Region
- Province: Balé
- Department: Yaho Department

Population (2019)
  - Total: 1,939

Mouni is a town in the Yaho Department of Balé Province in south-western Burkina Faso.

Population
Year	Pop.	±%
1985	796	—
2006	1,485	+86.6%
2019	1,939	+30.6%
