= Maoula =

- Location in Burkina Faso
- Coordinates: 11°51′N 3°26′W
- Country: Burkina Faso
- Region: Boucle du Mouhoun Region
- Province: Balé
- Department: Yaho Department

Population (2019)
  - Total: 965

Maoula is a village in the Yaho Department of Balé Province in southwestern Burkina Faso.

Population
| Year | Pop. | ±% |
|---|---|---|
| 1985 | 363 | — |
| 2006 | 772 | +112.7% |
| 2019 | 965 | +25.0% |
