= Bondo, Burkina Faso =

Bondo
- Location in Burkina Faso
- Coordinates: 11°46′N 3°26′W
- Country: Burkina Faso
- Region: Boucle du Mouhoun Region
- Province: Balé
- Department: Yaho Department

Population (2019)
  - Total: 2,199

Bondo is a town in the Yaho Department of Balé Province in south-western Burkina Faso.

Population
Year	Pop.	±%
1985	1,034	—
2006	1,922	+85.9%
2019	2,199	+14.4%
