= Giovanni Sbriglia =

Italian opera singer (1832–1916)

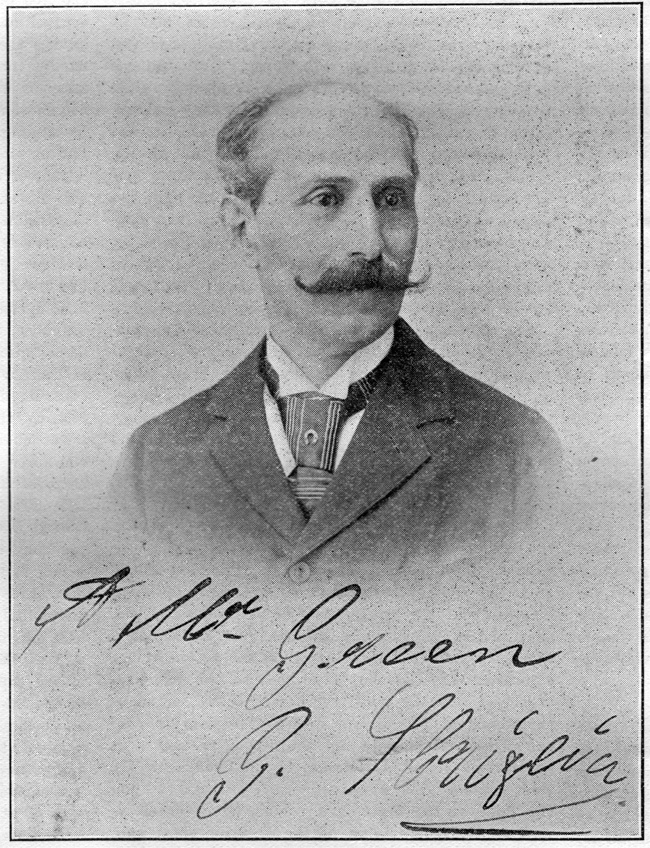
Giovanni Sbriglia between 1892 and 1902

Giovanni Sbriglia (June 23, 1832 – February 20, 1916), was an Italian tenor and prominent teacher of singing.

A native of Naples, Sbriglia attended the city's music conservatory under Emanuele De Roxas before making his debut, aged 21, at the Teatro San Carlo. He then performed throughout Italy before being engaged by Max Maretzek for New York City's Academy of Music. Sbriglia appeared, too, in Havana, Cuba and in Mexico, as well as the United States, until 1875, when he settled in Paris to teach.

During this period, he most notably transformed Jean de Reszke from a baritone into the world's foremost lyric-dramatic tenor. He also worked with Jean's soprano sister Josephine and his brother Édouard, a famous bass. Among Sbriglia's other renowned pupils were the dramatic soprano Lillian Nordica, the basso Pol Plançon, soprano Mena Cleary, contralto Clara Poole King, the lyric soprano Sybil Sanderson and the tenor Vladimir Rosing. Annie Lippincott, daughter of Grace Greenwood also studied under Sbriglia.

Sbriglia was made a member of the Royal Academy in Florence in 1890; he was also a member of the French Academy. He died in Paris at the age of 83.
