= Meem =

Meem is the letter Mem (also known as Meem / Mim), the thirteenth letter of many Semitic language abjads, including Phoenician, Aramaic, Hebrew and Arabic

Meem may also refer to:

- Gilbert S. Meem (1824–1908), Virginia politician and Confederate brigadier general
- John Gaw Meem (1894–1983), American architect
- Meem (bank), the retail banking arm of Gulf International Bank
- The commonly used phonetic pronunciation of the abbreviation for the Mechanical Engineering-Engineering Mechanics building at Michigan Technological University
- Bidya Sinha Saha Mim (born 1992), Bangladeshi actress

== See also ==
- Meme (disambiguation)
