= Mina (surname) =

Mina is a surname. Notable people with the name include:

- Antonios Aziz Mina (born 1955), Egyptian Coptic Catholic bishop
- Ara Mina, Filipina actress
- Denise Mina, Scottish crime writer
- Francisco Espoz y Mina, Spanish general, uncle of Francisco Javier Mina
- Harish Chandra Mina, an Indian MP
- Kang Mi-na (born 1999), South Korean singer known sometimes as “Mina”
- Kwon Mina (born 1993), South Korean singer, former member of South Korean girl group AOA
- Michael Mina, Egyptian-born American celebrity chef
- Shim Mina, South Korean singer performing as "Mina"
- Xavier Mina , Spanish soldier who fought in the Peninsular War and the Mexican War of Independence
- Yerry Mina, Colombian footballer,
- Zeina Mina, Lebanese athlete who represented Lebanon in the 1984 Olympic games in Los Angeles

== See also ==
- Minà, surname
- Mina (given name)
- Mena (surname)
