= Mena Cleary =

Canadian-born American actress and singer

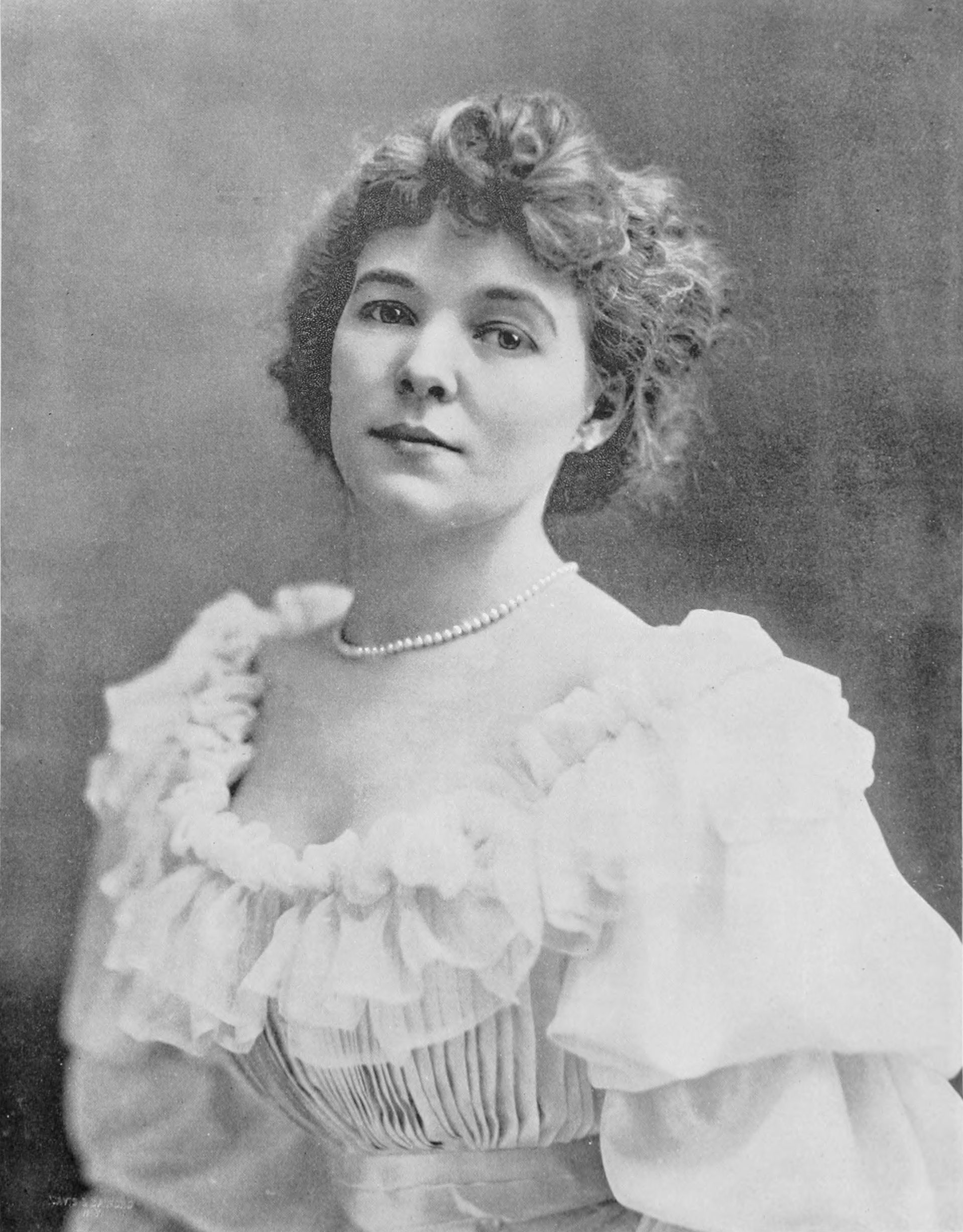
Mena Cleary

Wilhelmina Cleary Masury (1867 — June 27, 1929), known professionally as Mena Cleary, was a Canadian-born American actress and singer, a member of the original cast of Victor Herbert's Prince Ananias in 1894.

== Early life ==
Mena Cleary was the daughter of Martin Cleary and Maria Coghlan Cleary. She attended a convent school in Ottawa, Canada, then moved to Boston, where she studied music. She also studied voice in Paris with Giovanni Sbriglia.

== Career ==
Mena Cleary was a soprano, her voice "by no means powerful but...very sweet," and "managed with rare skill". Cleary was a member of The Bostonians, a performing troupe. She appeared as "Mirabel" in the original cast of the comic opera Prince Ananias by Victor Herbert, when it debuted in 1894. She also appeared in Girofle-Girofla in 1884 Fra Diavolo and The Poachers in 1888, and in Robin Hood, Fatinitza and The Maid of Plymouth in 1894, with the Bostonians.

In 1886, while performing in Fra Diavolo in New Haven, Connecticut, her hair caught fire from a lighted candle on stage. Her co-star Tom Karl quickly extinguished the flames, but his hands were badly burned instead. Members of the audience fainted and shrieked, but Cleary resumed her part "with difficulty" after the fire was out. Her 1888 turn as "Ginetta" in The Poachers drew admiration from a critic in Minnesota, who assured readers that "she is a very clever actress, with such winning ways, and a smiling pretty face, and a voice, while it is not a very great volume, is sweet in tone and as clear as the sound of a bell."

== Personal life ==
Mena Cleary married "millionaire physician, yachtsman, and globe trotter" John Miller Masury in 1897; they divorced in 1909. Mena Cleary Masury died in 1929, aged 62 years, in Brookline, Massachusetts.

Her sister Louise Cleary married a popular singer, Eugene Cowles, whom she met through Mena Cleary's work (Cowles was also in the original cast of Prince Ananias). Their sister Eleanor Cleary married Gerrit Fort. Another sister, Phillinda A. Cleary, married Harley Ellsworth Cummings.
