= Grand-balé =

Grand-balé Grand-balle
- Country: Burkina Faso
- Region: Boucle du Mouhoun Region
- Province: Balé
- Department: Yaho Department

Population (2019)
  - Total: 173

Grand-balé is a village in the Yaho Department of Balé Province in south-western Burkina Faso.

Population
Year	Pop.	±%
1985	708	—
2006	73	−89.7%
2019	173	+137.0%
