= Kongoba =

Kongoba Konkoba
- Location in Burkina Faso
- Coordinates: 11°55′N 3°29′W
- Country: Burkina Faso
- Region: Boucle du Mouhoun Region
- Province: Balé
- Department: Yaho Department

Population (2019)
  - Total: 768

Kongoba is a village in the Yaho Department of Balé Province in south-western Burkina Faso.

Population
Year	Pop.	±%
1985	322	—
2006	660	+105.0%
2019	768	+16.4%
