= Mena (surname) =

Mena (also: Spanish: de Mena, Basque: Menaca) is a Spanish surname that originates as both a Basque and Spanish Sephardic surname.

It is also a given name, Mena. The Meena tribe of India is also spelled as Mena.

== Basque meaning ==
Found in the valley of Mena (Alava, which today is Burgos), with branches in Bilbao and in Dima (Biscay) and it appears to have also moved from there into Navarre; regions now part of Spain. It appears to mean mineral or a vein of mineral deposits. However, at least one author, Lopez Mendizabal, holds that its meaning is pastoral. A variant of the surname is Menaca, with the '-ka' suffix representing "place of", as in "place of Mena", equivalent to the Spanish "de Mena".

== Notable people with the name ==
Alejandro Mena, Mexican Pro Player

- Carlos Mena, Spanish countertenor
- Cristian Mena, Dominican baseball player
- Eugenio Mena, Chilean footballer
- Gabriel Mena, Spanish poet, composer, musician and singer
- Gilberto García Mena, Mexican drug lord
- Javiera Mena, Chilean pop singer
- Juan de Mena, Spanish Renaissance poet
- Juanjo Mena, Spanish conductor
- Luis Mena (disambiguation), multiple people
  - Luis Mena, former President of Nicaragua
  - Luis Mena Irarrázabal, Chilean footballer
- Maria Mena, Norwegian pop singer
- Odlanier Mena, Chilean general
- Omar Mena, Cuban sprinter
- Pedro de Mena, Spanish sculptor in the 17th century
- Sharlett Mena, American politician; member of the Washington House of Representatives since 2023
- Yair Mena, Colombian footballer

== See also ==
- Mena (given name)
- Mina (surname)
