= Mneme (disambiguation) =

Mneme is one of the three original (Boeotian) Muses.

Mneme may also refer to one of the following:

- Mneme (moon), a moon of Jupiter
- Mneme Lake, in the South Shetland Islands, Antarctica
- Mneme, memory of an external-to-internal experience, a concept proposed by Richard Semon
