= Mamou, Burkina Faso =

Mamou
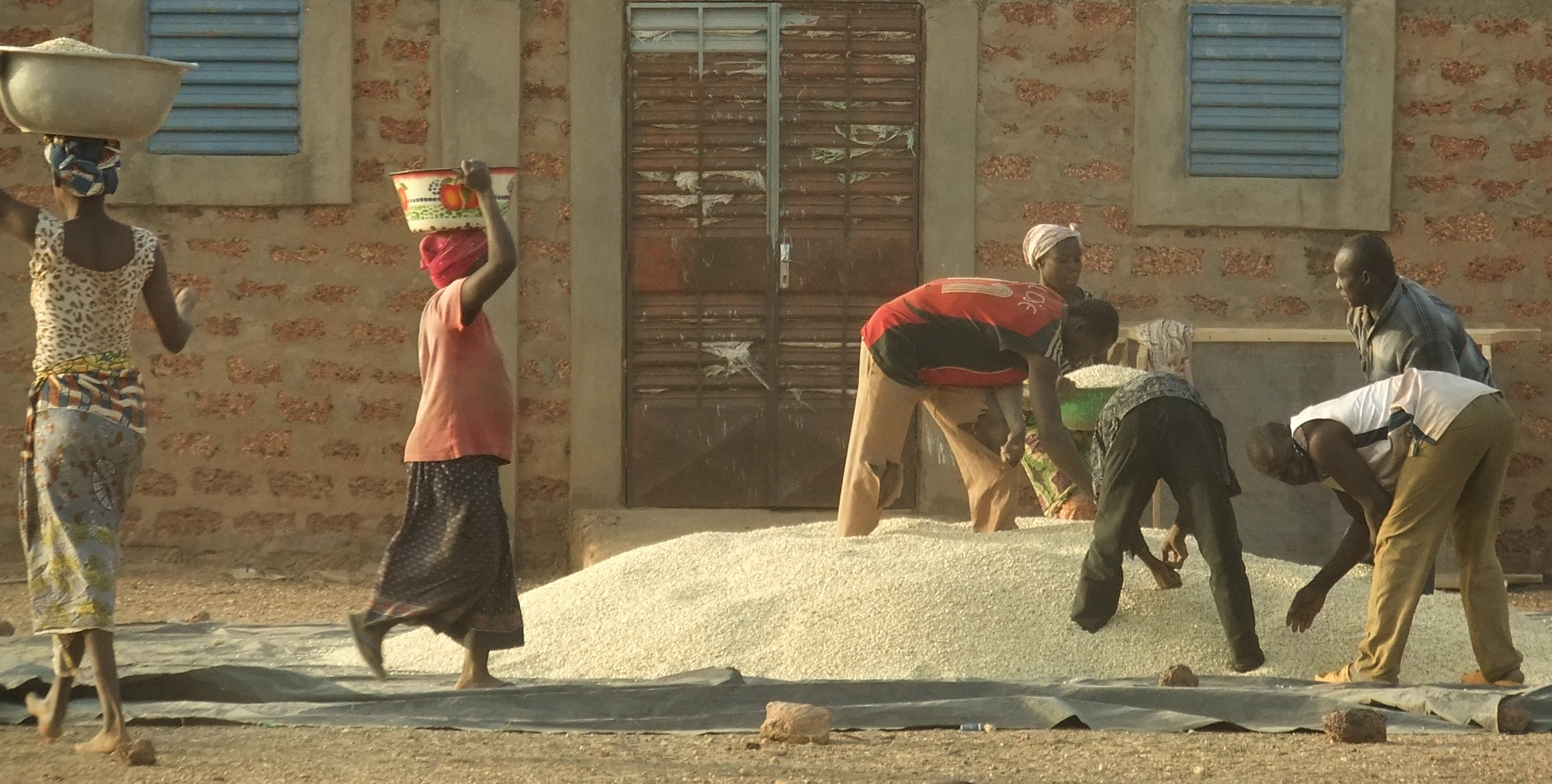

- Location in Burkina Faso
- Coordinates: 11°48′N 3°28′W
- Country: Burkina Faso
- Region: Boucle du Mouhoun Region
- Province: Balé
- Department: Yaho Department

Population (2019)
  - Total: 3,514

Mamou is a town in the Yaho Department of Balé Province in south-western Burkina Faso.

Population
Year	Pop.	±%
1985	1,888	—
2006	3,078	+63.0%
2019	3,514	+14.2%
