= Menas =

Menas, a male personal name, could refer to:

== People ==
- Menes (fl. c. 3100 BC), legendary Egyptian ruler and the first pharaoh of Egypt.
- Menas, one of the seventeen representatives for Sparta to swear an oath for the Peace of Nicias
- Menas (freedman), a Roman admiral who served under Sextus Pompeius
- Saint Menas (disambiguation)
- Menas or Minas of Aksum, Ethiopian bishop (6th century)
- Menas (Byzantine general) (d. 637), Byzantine general
- Menas (Coptic general), 7th century Coptic general
- Mina, son of Apacyrus (fl. 749 AD), leader of one of the Bashmurian revolts
- Pope Mina I of Alexandria (767–776)
- Pope Mina II of Alexandria (956–974)
- Menas of Ethiopia, Emperor of Ethiopia (1559–1563)

== Other ==
- A pirate in William Shakespeare's Antony and Cleopatra, based on the historical admiral
- Menas, Niger national football team nickname
- Menas or Meenas, a tribe of India

== See also ==
- Mena (disambiguation)
- Menes (disambiguation)
- Mina (disambiguation)
- Saint Menas (disambiguation)
