= Yaho, Burkina Faso =

Coordinates: 11°48′N 3°33′W

Yaho
- Interactive map of Yaho
- Country: Burkina Faso
- Region: Boucle du Mouhoun Region
- Province: Balé
- Department: Yaho Department

Population (2019)
  - Total: 4,306

Yaho is the capital of the Yaho Department of Balé Province in south-western Burkina Faso.

Population
Year	Pop.	±%
1985	3,146	—
2006	4,097	+30.2%
2019	4,306	+5.1%
