= Mina, Burkina Faso =

Mina
- Location in Burkina Faso
- Coordinates: 11°45′N 3°28′W
- Country: Burkina Faso
- Region: Boucle du Mouhoun Region
- Province: Balé
- Department: Yaho Department

Population (2019)
  - Total: 681

Mina is a village in the Yaho Department of Balé Province in south-western Burkina Faso.

Population
Year	Pop.	±%
1985	457	—
2006	605	+32.4%
2019	681	+12.6%
