= Dr. John Miller-Masury House =

Historic house in Virginia, United States

- U.S. National Register of Historic Places
- Virginia Landmarks Register
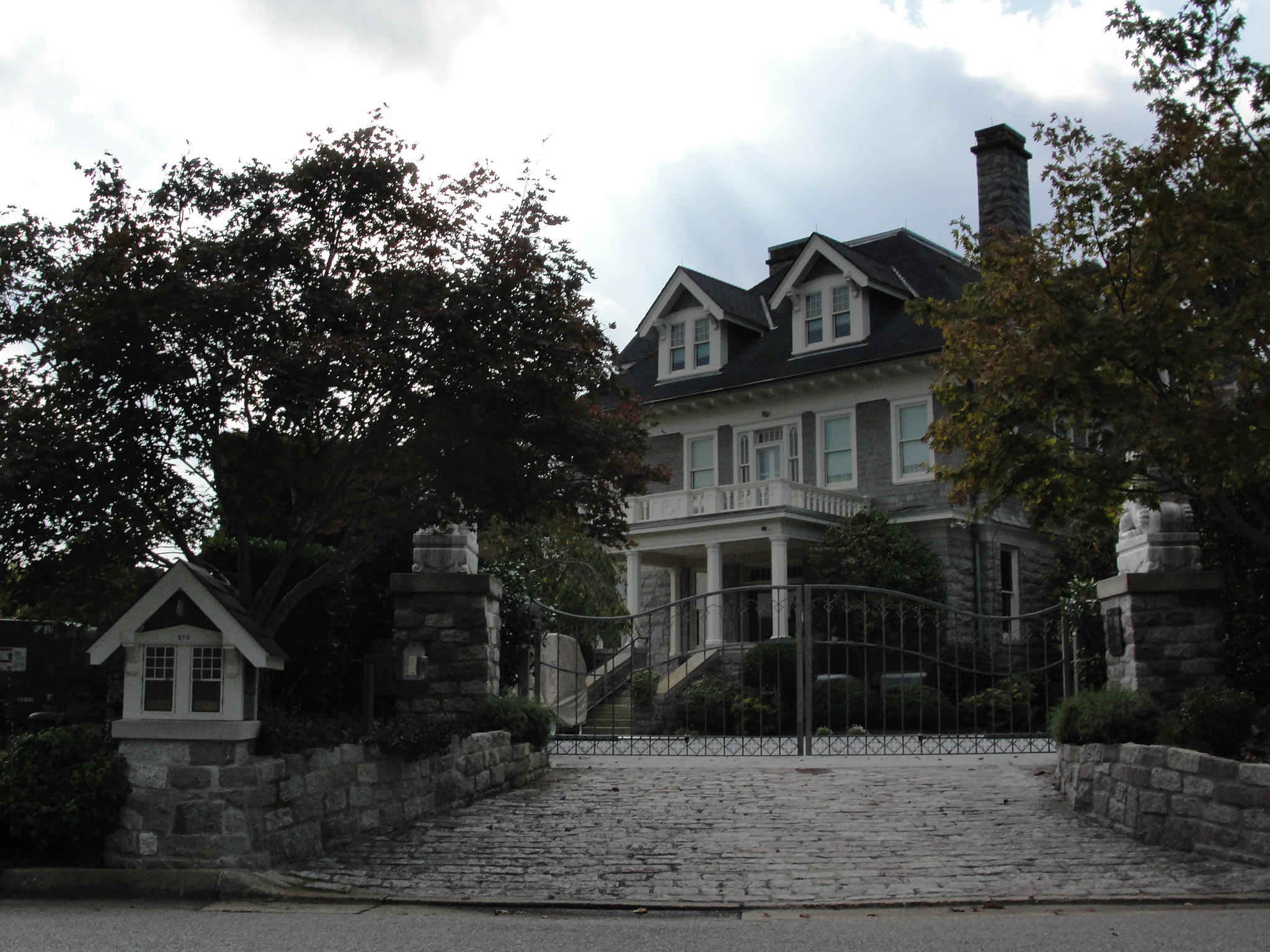
- Dr. John Miller-Masury House, September 2012

- Location within Virginia Location within the United States
- Location: 515 Wilder Point, Virginia Beach, Virginia
- Coordinates: 36°52′42″N 75°59′34″W
- Area: 1 acre (0.40 ha)
- Built: 1906-1908
- Architect: Eberhard, Arnold
- Architectural style: Late-19th- and 20th-century Revivals
- NRHP reference No.: 97000488
- VLR No.: 134-0532

Significant dates
- Added to NRHP: May 23, 1997
- Designated VLR: March 19, 1997

Dr. John Miller-Masury House, also known as Lakeside (1906–1935), Crystal Club (1935–1939), and Greystone Manor (1942-present), is a historic home located at Virginia Beach, Virginia. It was built in 1906–1908, and is a 2 1/2-story, five-bay, L-shaped stone-and-slate dwelling. It is covered by two hipped roofs with dormers, which intersect at a three-story castellated tower. It has a one-story, deep, wraparound porch. From 1936 to 1939, the building housed the Crystal Club, a gambling casino and nightclub.

It was added to the National Register of Historic Places in 1997.
