= Mina, Razavi Khorasan =

Mina مينا
- Village
- Location within Iran
- Coordinates: 37°20′03″N 59°00′58″E
- Country: Iran
- Province: Razavi Khorasan
- County: Dargaz
- Bakhsh: Chapeshlu
- Rural District: Qara Bashlu

Population (2006)
  - Total: 176
- Time zone: UTC+3:30 (IRST)
  - Summer (DST): UTC+4:30 (IRDT)

Mina (Persian: مينا, also Romanized as Mīnā; also known as Mīnā Qal‘eh) is a village in Qara Bashlu Rural District, Chapeshlu District, Dargaz County, Razavi Khorasan Province, Iran. At the 2006 census, its population was 176, in 42 families.
