= Michele Di Menna =

Canadian artist

Michele Di Menna (born 1980) is a Canadian interdisciplinary artist who works with text, performance, sculpture and collage.

== Biography ==
Michele Di Menna was born in Vancouver, British Columbia. She attended the Emily Carr Institute of Art and Design in Vancouver and later attended Staatliche Hochschule für Bildende Künste Städelschule (2005-2010), in Frankfurt Germany.

== Reception ==
Frieze.com has described Di Menna's artistic practice as "a persistently process-based approach (that) is self-referential."

== Select group exhibitions ==
- 2019: Marabu: Badischer Kunstverein, Karlsruhe, Germany
- 2018: Schmalz: Guimarães, Vienna, Austria
- 2018: Landfall and Departure: Epilogue (Listening to the Sea): Nanaimo Art Gallery, Nanaimo, British Columbia
- 2017: in awe: cur. by Melanie Ohnemus, Kunsthalle Exnergasse, Vienna, Austria
- 2016: Ein Schelm: wer Böses dabei denkt : cur. by Stephanie Siedel and Fanny Gonella, Kuenstlerhaus Bremen, Bremen, Germany
- 2016: Rage Farmer Rage Profiteer: Beautiful Gallery, Chicago, United States
- 2015: Dérive Dérivée:Fondation CAB (CAB Art Center), Brussels, Belgium
- 2015: Spielraum: Städsschen Galerie Nordhorn, Nordhorn, Germany
- 2014: Jahre Halle fuer Kunst Lueneburg, Lueneburg, Germany
- 2014: A Soft Tragedy: Kinderhook and Caracas, Berlin, Germany
- 2013: The only performances that make it all the way/ Kunstlerhaus: Halle fur Kunst and Medien, Graz
- 2012: the Avantgarde: Deep Cuts: Marres Centre for Contemporary Culture, London, England
- 2011: Beautiful Weather: Foksal Gallery Foundation, Warsaw
- 2011: based in Berlin, Berlin
- 2010: Maladresses ou la Figure de l'Idiot: Institute of Social Hypocrisy, Paris, France
- 2009: The Perpetual Dialogue: Andrea Rosen Gallery, New York City, United States
- 2009: Ginger Goodwin Way: Or Gallery, Vancouver, British Columbia, Canada
- 2008: The Great Transformation, Art and Tactical Magic: MARCO, Museo de Arte Contemporánea, Monterrey, Mexico
- 2008: The Great Transformation, Art and Tactical Magic: Frankfurter Kunstverein, Frankfurt am Main, Germany

== Solo exhibitions ==
- 2019: The bells put out their tongues: The Beach Office, Berlin, Germany
- 2016: This piece of cod passeth understanding: Ashley, Berlin, Germany
- 2010: Art Statement with Galerie Kamm at Art 41 Basel

== Residencies ==
Michele was a resident at Western Front from Oct 2- Nov 11, 2013 and later completed a residency at Fogo Island Arts in 2015.
