= Emil Mollenhauer =

American musician, orchestra violinist and conductor

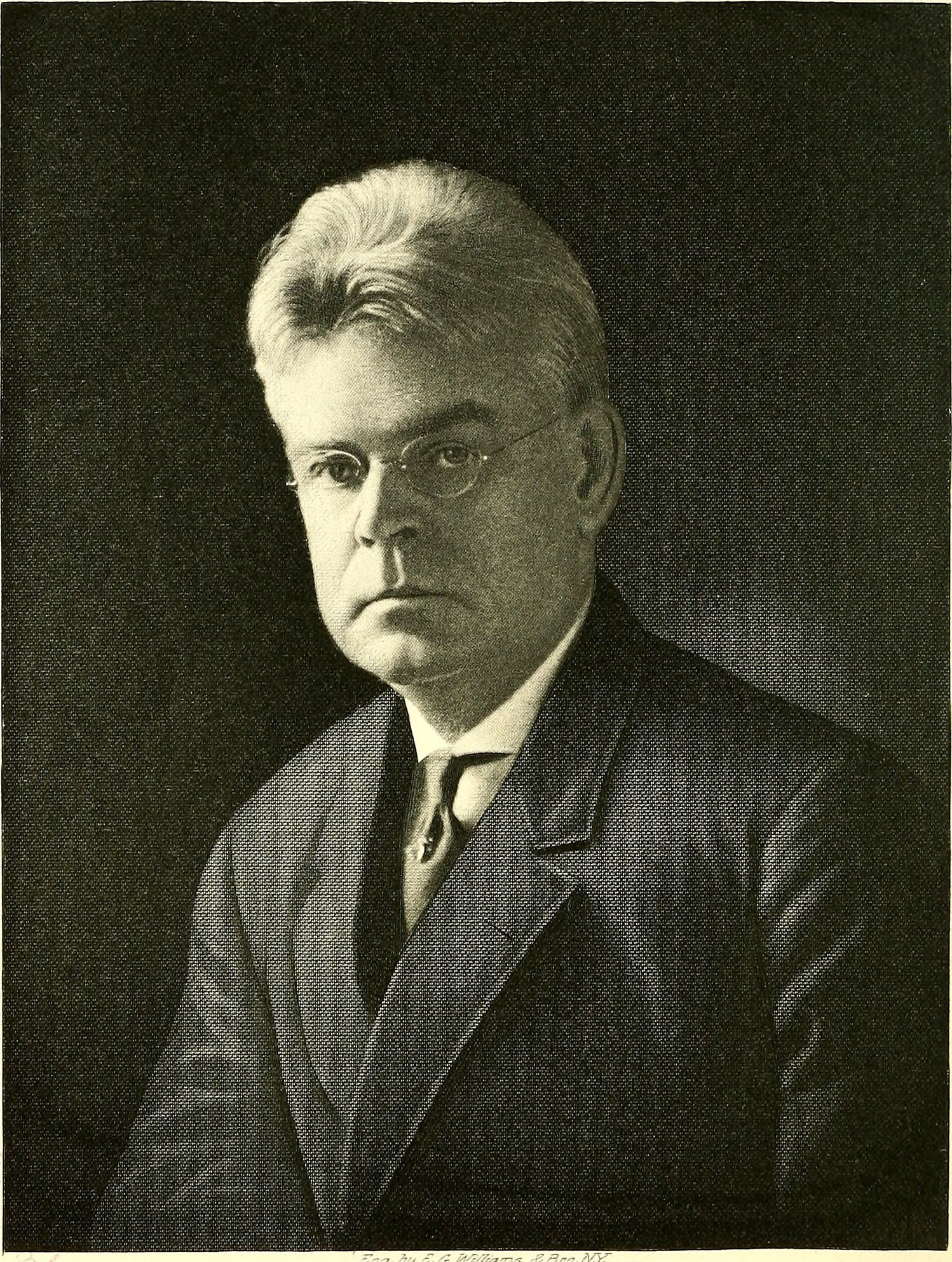
Emil Mollenhauer

Emil Mollenhauer (1855–1927) was an American musician, an orchestra violinist and conductor.

== Biography ==
Emil Mollenhauer was born in Brooklyn, New York, on August 4, 1855, to Frederick Mollenhauer of Erfurt, Germany, who was himself a violinist. He attended public school in Brooklyn. He was a musical prodigy and was playing in the orchestra of Niblo's Garden in February 1864 before he was nine years old. From the age of sixteen he played in the orchestras of the Booth Theatre, where his uncle led the orchestra, that of Theodore Thomas at Central Park Garden, and the Damrosch Orchestra, where he also played piano. He left New York City for Boston where he played at the Bijou Opera House. He played first violin in the Boston Symphony Orchestra from 1884 to 1888. He turned to conducting and led the Germania Orchestra for several years and then led several annual tours as head of the Boston Festival Orchestra, leading concerts with such notable soloists as Emma Calvé, Nellie Melba, and Eugène Ysaÿe. Mollenhauer was conductor of the Apollo Club of Boston, an acclaimed men's chorus, from November 1901 through April 1927. He became conductor of Boston's Handel and Haydn Society in 1899 and held that post until his death.

Mollenhauer married Mary Laverty, a professional singer. He died at his home in Boston, Massachusetts, on December 10, 1927. He was scheduled to conduct a concert the day following his death.
