= San Menna =

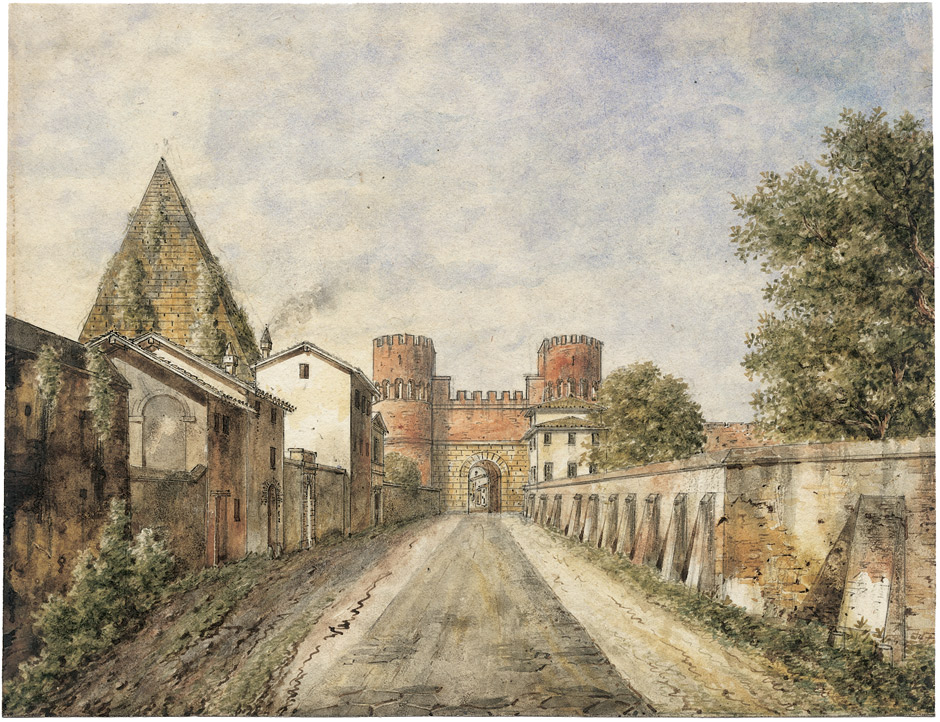
The church of San Menna fell somewhere between Porta San Paolo (pictured) and the Basilica of Saint Paul on the Ostian Way.

San Menna (Italian: Saint Menas) was an ancient church in Rome, formerly located along the Via Ostiensis which led to the Basilica of Saint Paul. It appears to have been destroyed at some point after the tenth century.

== Location ==
In the eighth century, the anonymous pilgrim of Einsiedeln pointed out that there existed a church dedicated to the Egyptian martyr Saint Menas on the Ostian Way, a little before reaching the Basilica of Saint Paul. The church was connected to the famous portico that led from Porta San Paolo into the Ostian Basilica, as is evidenced from the pilgrimage itineraries of the seventh century: inde per porticum usque ad ecclesiam Mennae, et de Menna usque ad s. Paulum Apostolum. (Note: "Thence through the portico, up to the church of Menna, and from Menna up to Saint Paul the Apostle." Mariano Armellini notes that he located a document in the Vatican Archives from the pontificate of Pope Urban VIII (1623–1644) recording that even at that late date, some remnants of that portico still existed (adhuc vestigia et parietes supersunt — "still some remnants and walls of it remain").) A precise location for the church may be next to a small bridge (ponticello) along the porticus that spanned the Almone, a small river that used to flow into the Tiber from the east, but is today diverted.

The church was one of a series of auxiliary structures that were built along the porticus on the Via Ostiensis. These included an oratory to Saint Euplius, which had been founded by Pope Theodore I (642–649) next to the gates, and a chapel dedicated to Saints Peter and Paul built by Pope Donus (678–678), which was later connected to the legendary meeting between the two saints before their martyrdom.

On the Wednesday after the fourth Sunday of Lent, when the station is held at the Basilica of Saint Paul, the collecta was held at this church of San Menna, meaning that the people and ministers of the city would meet there and prepare for the procession into the principal church for the day's liturgy. Armellini notes that documents of the sixteenth century make no mention of the church's status as a collect church.

== History ==
The church of San Menna was very ancient, being first mentioned in an inscription from the year 589. At around that time, it is recorded that Gregory the Great (590–604) offered one of his Homilies on the Gospels (XXXVI) there. In his introduction to the homily, he gives a hint as to the relative location of the church: quia longius ab urbe digressi sumus, ne ad revertendum tardior hora praepediat. (Note: "Since we have come a longer way out of the city, let us not be impeded by a later hour for returning.")

The church was enriched with gifts by Pope Paschal I (817–824) and restored by Pope Leo IV (847–855), as is recorded in the biographies of those popes. Shortly after the tenth century, however, no further mention is made of it.

== Bibliography ==
- Spera, Lucrezia (2005). "S. Mennae basilica". Lexicon Topographicum Urbis Romae. III. Rome: 63–64.

== References and notes ==
Notes
