= Yaho Department =

Coordinates: 11°48′N 3°33′W

Yaho
- Department
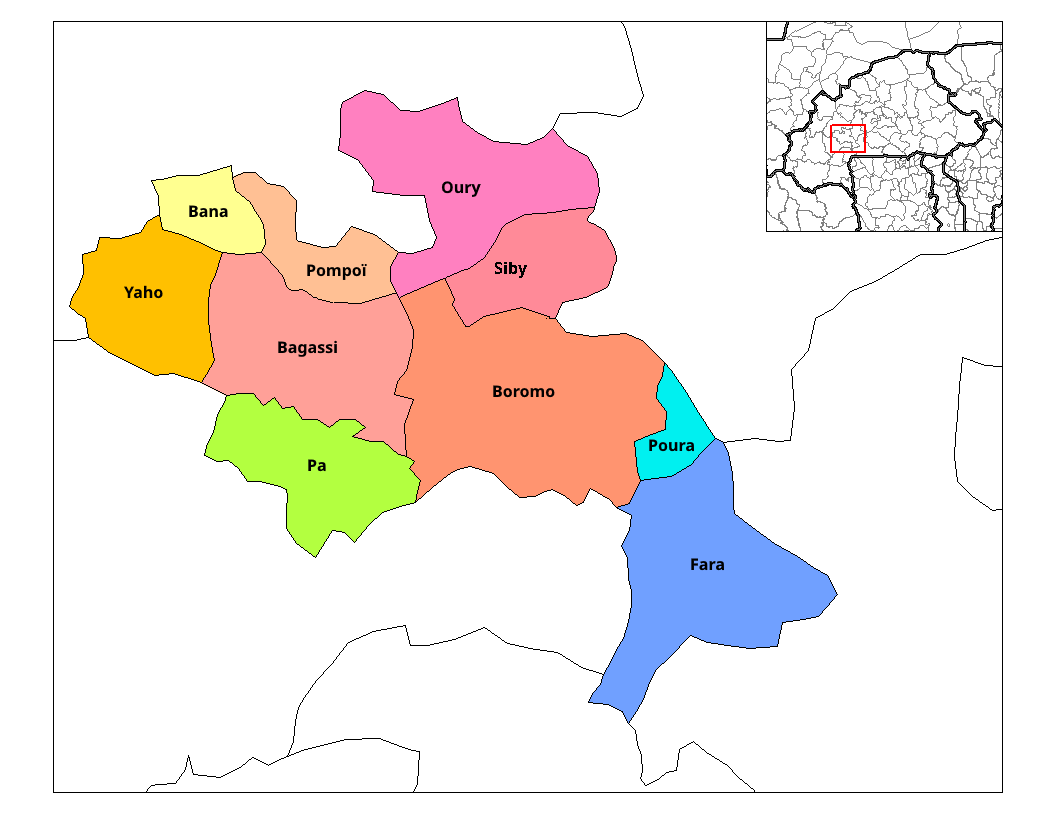
- Yaho Department location in the province
- Country: Burkina Faso
- Province: Balé

Population (2009)
  - Total: 16,424
- Time zone: UTC+0 (GMT 0)

Yaho is a department in the Balé Province in southern Burkina Faso. Its capital lies at the town of Yaho. According to the 1996 census the department had a total population of 14,257. As of August 2009 the department's population has increased to 16,424.

Yaho is a rural commune consisting of 10 villages and the area is approximately 400 km^{2}. The mayor of Yaho Commune since 2006 is Zounkata Tuina, an architect educated in Chalmers University of Technology at Gothenburg, Sweden. Currently, the Yaho population is working to meet the UN Millennium Development Goals (MDGs). One project the people hope to initiate in the near future is a dam on a river along the western border, which could provide the region with irrigation to large farming areas and a big lake with fish.

== Towns and villages ==
Largest towns and villages and populations in the commune are as follows (August 2009):

- Yaho (4 500 inhabitants) (capital)
- Bondo (1 625 inhabitants)
- Fobiri (1 818 inhabitants)
- Grand-balé (90 inhabitants)
- Kongoba (624 inhabitants)
- Madou (1 823 inhabitants)
- Mamou (3 526 inhabitants)
- Maoula (638 inhabitants)
- Mina (650 inhabitants)
- Mouni (1 130 inhabitants)
