= Saint Mennas =

Saint Mennas may refer to:

- Ecumenical Patriarch Mennas of Constantinople, 6th-century patriarch of Constantinople
- Saint Menas, 3rd-century Egyptian martyr
