= Meme (band) =

Indie-pop band from Minneapolis

Meme is an indie-pop music project created by producer Danny Burke and singer/lyricist Lizzie Brown based in Minneapolis, Minnesota.

== Career ==
The couple began making music together after-hours at In the Groove Music's studio where Danny Burke works as a producer and songwriter. The group's sound combines Lizzie Brown's ethereal pop voice and sense of melody with Danny Burke's ambient electro-acoustic songs. The group has been featured on multiple television shows and movies including Jersey Shore, Gossip Girl, From Prada to Nada, and The Real L Word.

=== Albums ===
Meme's first self-titled disc was released in the summer of 2010. Their second disc, Primary Colours, was scheduled to release in the summer of 2011.
