= Mina language =

Mina language may refer to:

- Mina language (Togo), also known as Gen
- Hina language, also known as Mina and Besleri, a Chadic language spoken in Northern Cameroon
- Meena language, a spurious language attributed to the Meena tribe in India
