= RIOX2 =

Protein-coding gene in humans

Identifiers
- Aliases: RIOX2, MDIG, MINA53, NO52, ROX, MINA, MYC-induced nuclear antigen, MYC induced nuclear antigen, ribosomal oxygenase 2, JMJD10
- External IDs: OMIM: 612049; MGI: 1914264; GeneCards: RIOX2
Available structures
PDB	Ortholog search: PDBe RCSB
PDB	List of PDB id codes 2XDV, 4BU2, 4BXF
Enzyme activity
EC #	BRENDA	ExPASy	KEGG	MetaCyc
1.14.11.79	↗	↗	↗	↗

Gene location (Human)
Chr.	Chromosome 3 (human)
Band	3q11.2	Start	97,941,818 bp
Band	3q11.2	End	97,972,457 bp

Gene location (Mouse)
Chr.	Chromosome 16 (mouse)
Band	16|16 C1.3	Start	59,292,138 bp
Band	16|16 C1.3	End	59,312,824 bp
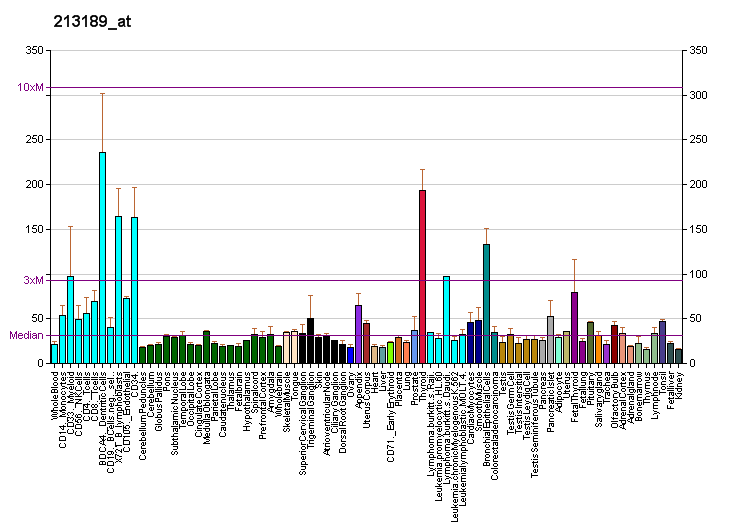

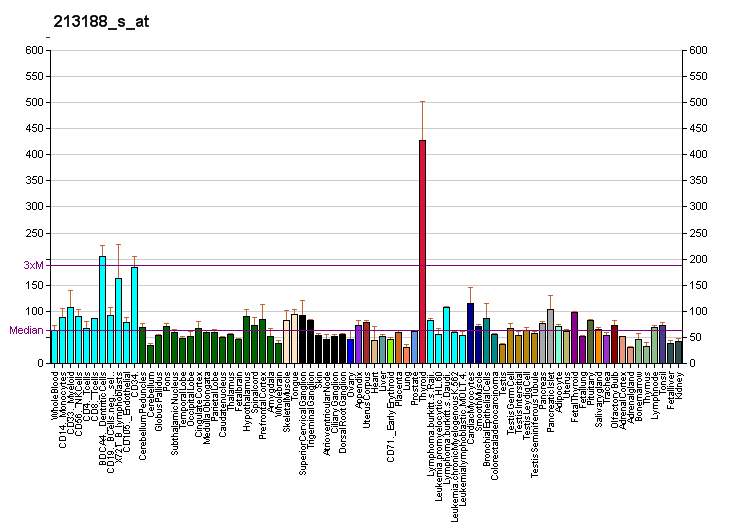
RNA expression pattern
Bgee	Human / Mouse (ortholog); Top expressed in: secondary oocyte; right lobe of thyroid gland; left lobe of thyroid gland; oral cavity; buccal mucosa cell; internal globus pallidus; parotid gland; body of pancreas; tendon of biceps brachii; Skeletal muscle tissue of rectus abdominis / Top expressed in: otic placode; saccule; otic vesicle; primitive streak; epiblast; sternocleidomastoid muscle; temporal muscle; digastric muscle; embryo; right kidney; More reference expression data
BioGPS	More reference expression data
Gene ontology
Molecular function	oxidoreductase activity; dioxygenase activity; metal ion binding; histone demethylase activity; identical protein binding; histone H3-methyl-lysine-4 demethylase activity; histone H3-methyl-lysine-36 demethylase activity; transcription corepressor activity
Cellular component	nucleolus; transcription regulator complex; nucleus; nucleoplasm; cytosol
Biological process	regulation of transcription, DNA-templated; negative regulation of transcription by RNA polymerase II; transcription, DNA-templated; negative regulation of transcription, DNA-templated; histone demethylation; chromatin remodeling; peptidyl-arginine hydroxylation; histone H3-K4 demethylation; ribosome biogenesis; histone H3-K36 demethylation; negative regulation of nucleic acid-templated transcription
Sources:Amigo / QuickGO
Orthologs
Databases	NCBI: entry; OMA: entry
Species	Human	Mouse
Entrez	84864	67014
Ensembl	ENSG00000170854	ENSMUSG00000022724
UniProt	Q8IUF8	Q8CD15
RefSeq (mRNA)	NM_001042533; NM_001261829; NM_032778; NM_153182	NM_025910
RefSeq (protein)	NP_001035998; NP_001248758; NP_116167; NP_694822	NP_080186
Location (UCSC)	Chr 3: 97.94 – 97.97 Mb	Chr 16: 59.29 – 59.31 Mb
PubMed search
- Wikidata
View/Edit Human	View/Edit Mouse

Ribosomal oxygenase 2 is a protein that in humans is encoded by the RIOX2 gene.
