= Madou, Burkina Faso =

Madou
- Location in Burkina Faso
- Coordinates: 11°50′N 3°26′W
- Country: Burkina Faso
- Region: Boucle du Mouhoun Region
- Province: Balé
- Department: Yaho Department

Population (2019)
  - Total: 2,326

Madou is a town in the Yaho Department of Balé Province in south-western Burkina Faso.

Population
Year	Pop.	±%
1985	1,156	—
2006	1,828	+58.1%
2019	2,326	+27.2%
