= Minà =

Minà is a surname. Notable people with the surname include:

- Francesco Minà Palumbo (1814–1899), Italian naturalist
- Gianni Minà (1938–2023), Italian journalist and writer
