= Mariano Armellini =

Italian archaeologist and historian (1852–1896)

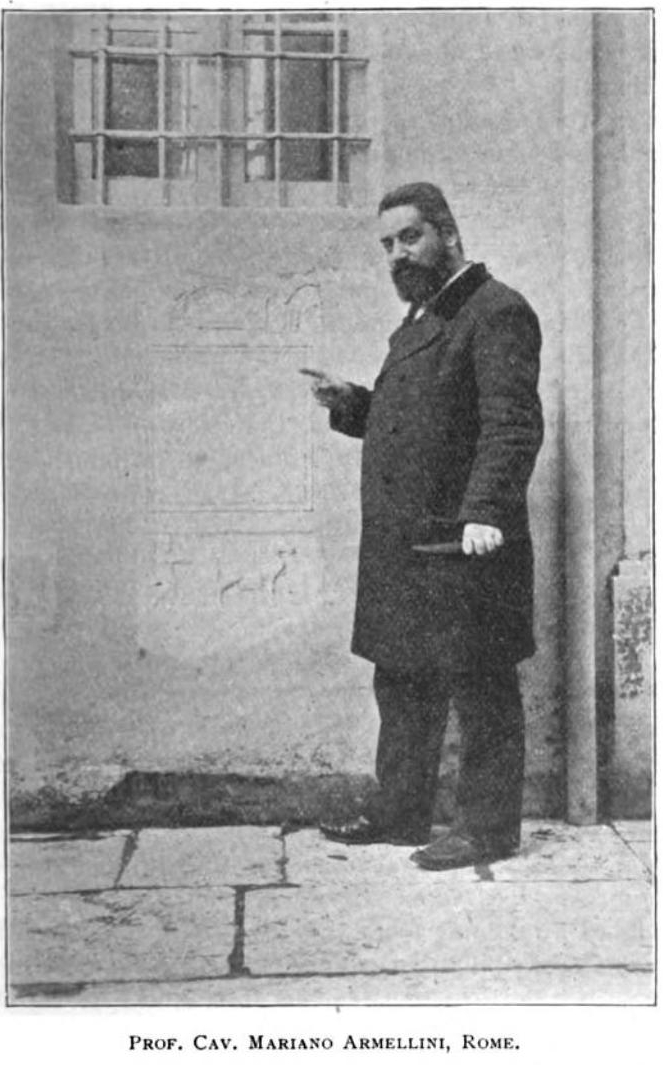
Mariano Armellini

Mariano Armellini (7 February 1852 – 24 February 1896) was an Italian archaeologist and historian. Born in Rome, he was one of the founders of the Pontifical Academy of Martyrs, and was named a Knight of Order of St. Gregory the Great by Pope Leo XIII.

His father died when he was eighteen, and his mother soon after, leaving him to care for his two brothers and seven sisters. He received a degree of Doctor of Divinity from Pontifical Gregorian University, and was a disciple of archaeologist Giovanni Battista de Rossi. He enjoyed exploring the catacombs of Rome, where he discovered the crypt of Saint Emerentiana.

He is the author of Gli antichi cimiteri cristiani di Roma e d'Italia (The Ancient Christian Cemeteries of Rome and Italy) and Le catacombe romane (The Roman Catacombs), but became famous chiefly for Le chiese di Roma dal secolo IV al XIX (The Churches of Rome from the 4th to the 19th Centuries), a major work in which he recorded many of the city's churches, including those no longer extant. For twenty years he published the periodical Armellini's Monthly Chronicle of Archaeology and History.
