= Caroline M. Bell =

American female artist (1874–1970)

Caroline Martha Bell
- Born: September 1, 1874; New York City, New York, U.S.
- Died: October 25, 1970; Cutchogue, New York, U.S.
- Burial place: New Bethany Cemetery, Mattituck, New York, United States
- Other names: Dolly M. Bell
- Occupation(s): Visual artist, educator
- Known for: Paintings of coastal landscapes
- Movement: Peconic Bay Impressionism

Caroline "Dolly" Martha Bell (1874–1970) was an American artist and educator, who painted water and landscape scenes mostly around the Peconic region of Long Island, New York. She, along with other local female artists would often paint impressionist type paintings together.

== Early life ==
Caroline Martha Bell was born on September 1, 1874, in New York City, to Jackson Wood Bell and Letitia Vandervoort Bell, though her parents divorced when Bell was young. Bell began to spend her summers out in Southold with her mother, as her mother's family are descendants of the original settlers of Southold.

In 1907 Bell made a more permanent settlement in Mattituck, but continued to travel around for her art.

== Career ==
While known for her scenes of the Peconic region, Bell spent some of her early years painting in Woodstock, New York while visiting with her cousin George Reeve and his family. Some of her early works are considered to be tonalist in style and later transitioned into more impressionist. Bell studied with artists Edward Bell (no relation) and Whitney Hubbard both in Woodstock and on Long Island. When she settled on the eastern end of Long Island, she set up her studio on Love Lane in Mattituck. This area of the North Fork had many other artists working and living here during this time including Edith and Henry Prellwitz and Irving Wiles.

While residing on the eastern end of Long Island, Bell along with other female artists formed what would later be referred to as the Peconic Bay Impressionists by a local gallery owner from the area. This group included artists such as, Julia Wickham, Maurgerite Moore Hawkins, Clara Moore Howard as well as a few others. They would often paint together around the North Fork as well as travel to other parts of New York and the New England region visiting inlets and fishing villages. Bell and her group would often participate in plein-air painting when they traveled around these areas. Though most of Bell's work primarily revolves around the New England area, she has also made trips to Europe as well.

Bell started to train aspiring painters in the 1920s both at her Mattituck studio as well as on site at some of her painting spots she frequently traveled to. She then adopted the nicknames "Mama" and more well known, "Dolly" from other artists in her circle. Both Clara Moore Howard and her cousin Marguerite Moore Hawkins were students of Bell's early on and continued to travel and paint together. Hawkins and Bell even continued to grow as artists together and take classes with Emile Gruppe and Anthony Thieme in Gloucester, Massachusetts.

Around the 1930s and 1940s, Bell started to get more recognition and fame for her work.

== Notable exhibitions ==
Throughout Bell's career she participated in approximately 75 exhibitions across Long Island, New York City, upstate New York, and Massachusetts where she had strong ties to the art communities in these areas. In 1941 Bell won first prize at an exhibition held by the Long Island Federation of Women's Club. Today, Bell's paintings are still used in exhibitions in many Long Island museums and Galleries.

A few of the artist clubs that Bell belonged too were:

- Allied Artists of Long Island
- Gloucester Society of Artists
- Guild Hall Museum
- National Association of Women Painters and Sculptors
- North Fork Art Club
- North Shore Arts Association
- Parrish Art Museum
- Suffolk Museum at Stony Brook (Now the Long Island Museum of American Art, History, and Carriages)
- Woodstock Art Association

== Later life ==
Bell died at the age of 96 on October 25, 1970, while living in a nursing home in Cutchogue.
