= Prellwitz =

Prellwitz is a surname of Prussian origin. Notable people with the surname include:

- Edith Mitchill Prellwitz (1865–1944), American artist
- Henry Prellwitz (1865–1940), American artist
- Karin von Prellwitz, cofounder of Eulama literary agency

== See also ==
- Przelewice, Wałcz County, a village in northwestern Poland whose German name is Prellwitz
- Prillwitz, a village in Germany
