= Elizabeth Scott =

Elizabeth Scott may refer to:

- Elisabeth Scott (1898–1972), British architect
- Elisabeth Scott Bocock (1901–1985), American philanthropist
- Elizabeth Scott (author) (born 1972), American novelist
- Elizabeth Scott (hymnwriter) (1708-1776), English, American hymnwriter
- Elizabeth Scott (mathematician) (1917–1988), American mathematician
- Elizabeth Scott (swimmer) (fl. 1990s), American Paralympic swimmer
- Elizabeth Scott (poet) (17 July 1729 – 1789), Scottish poet
- Elizabeth Scott (politician) (born 1966), member of the Washington House of Representatives, 2013–2017
- Elizabeth Scott Flood (c. 1828–1867), American educator and activist
- Elizabeth Talford Scott (1916–2011), American folk artist
- Elizabeth Scott (textile manufacturer), (died 1795) Scottish organiser of weaving
- Elizabeth Scott, Duchess of Buccleuch (1743–1827)
- Elizabeth Scott, Duchess of Buccleuch (1954–2023), Scottish peeress and philanthropist
- Elizabeth Scott, Countess of Eldon (c. 1754–1831)

== See also ==
- Lizabeth Scott (1922–2015), American actress
- Lizzie Scott (born 2004), English cricketer
- Elisabeth Alden Stam (née Scott), missionary murdered in 1934, see Murder of John and Betty Stam
