= Meen =

Meen may refer to:

== People with the name ==
- Meen (surname)
- Méen, a Breton saint

== Arts, entertainment, and media ==
- Meen (band), a Lebanese Rock band founded by Fouad and Toni Yammine
- I.M. Meen, a DOS game made by Animation Magic

== See also ==
- The Me'en language, a Surmic language of Ethiopia
- The Me'en people, a Surma people of southwestern Ethiopia
- Mean (disambiguation)
- Means (disambiguation)
- Meme (disambiguation)
- Min (disambiguation)
- Meena (disambiguation)
