= In the Meantime =

In the Meantime or In The Mean Time, may refer to:

== Literature ==
- In the Meantime, a 2000 self-help book by Iyanla Vanzant
- In the Mean Time, a volume of the I Hate Fairyland comic book serial from Image Comics
- In the Mean Time: The Other Ends of the World Cartoons and Dark Light Verse, a 2010 comics volume by Anthony Haden-Guest

== Music ==
=== Songs and singles ===
- "In the Meantime" (Badfinger song), a 1974 Badfinger off the album Wish You Were Here
- "In the Meantime" (Helmet song), 1992 single by Helmet off the album Meantime
- "In the Meantime" (Spacehog song), 1996 debut single by Spacehog off their 1995 debut album Resident Alien
- "In the Meantime", a 2001 single by Sherrié Austin off the album Followin' a Feelin'
- "In The Meantime", a 2003 song by Gloria Estefan off the album Unwrapped (album)
- "In the Meantime", a 2010 song by Sarah Marince
- "In the Mean Time", a 2024 single by Lacuna Coil
- "In the Mean Time", a 2012 single by Chris Knight (singer) off the album Little Victories
- "In The Mean Time", a 2001 song by The Waltons off the album Liv (Waltons album)

=== Albums and records ===
- In the Meantime (Joe Pug EP), a 2010 EP by Joe Pug
- In the Meantime, a 2018 EP by Spacey Jane
- In the Meantime, a 2018 record single by Spacey Jane
- In the Meantime (Alessia Cara album), 2021
- In the Meantime (Christine McVie album), 2004
- In the Meantime (Watershed album), by Watershed, 2002
- In The Mean Time, a 1998 album by Hugh Fraser (musician)
- In The Mean Time, a 2004 album by Gretchen (band)

== See also ==
- In the Mean Time & in Between Time a 2010 album by Michael Marshall (singer)
- In the Meantime, In Between Time, a 1991 album by The Party
- In the Meantime and In Between Time, a 2004 album by SNFU
- In the Meantime, Darling, a 1944 American drama film
- Mean time (disambiguation)
- Meanwhile (disambiguation)
- In time (disambiguation)
- Mean (disambiguation)
- Time (disambiguation)
