= Wiles =

Wiles is a surname. Notable people with the surname include:

- Adam Wiles (born 1984), real name of Scottish singer, songwriter, DJ, and producer Calvin Harris
- Andrew Wiles (born 1953), British mathematician who proved Fermat's Last Theorem
- Archie Wiles (1892–1957), cricketer from Trinidad
- Billy Wiles (born 1971), American wrestler
- Collin Wiles (born 1994), American baseball player
- Darrell D. Wiles (1914–2001), judge of the United States Tax Court
- Irving Ramsey Wiles (1861–1948), United States artist
- Jacqueline Wiles (born 1992), American alpine skier
- Jason Wiles (born 1970), actor, director and producer
- John Wiles (1925–1999), British television producer
- Lemuel M. Wiles (1826–1905), American landscape painter
- Margaret Jones Wiles (1911–2000), American composer, conductor, and teacher
- Maurice Wiles (1923–2005), British theologian, father of Andrew Wiles
- Mary Kate Wiles (born 1987), American film, TV and YouTube actor
- Michael E. Wiles, American judge
- Michele Wiles (born 1980), principal dancer at American Ballet Theatre
- Simon Wiles (born 1985), English footballer
- Siouxsie Wiles, microbiologist and science communicator
- Susie Wiles (born 1957), American political consultant

== See also ==
- 9999 Wiles, an asteroid
- Cape Wiles, a headland in South Australia
- Wile (disambiguation)
