= Meanwhile =

Meanwhile may refer to:

== Music ==
=== Albums ===
- Meanwhile (Camouflage album), 1991
- Meanwhile (Eric Clapton album), 2024
- ...Meanwhile, a 1992 album by British pop band 10cc
- Meanwhile..., a 1995 album by world fusion ensemble Trance Mission
- Meanwhile EP, a 2021 EP by the animated band Gorillaz

=== Songs ===
- "Meanwhile" (George Strait song), 1999
- "Meanwhile" (The Moody Blues song), 1981
- "Meanwhile", by Caroline Polachek on the 2024 album Desire, I Want To Turn Into You: Everasking Edition
- "Meanwhile", by Gorillaz on the 2021 EP Meanwhile
- "Meanwhile", by Little River Band on the 1975 album Little River Band

== Other uses ==
- Meanwhile (novel), a 1927 novel by H.G. Wells
- Meanwhile (1998 film), a Canadian short suspense film
- Meanwhile, a 2010 interactive graphic novel by Jason Shiga (and Meanwhile..., a 2001 minicomic by the same author)
- Meanwhile (2011 film), a film written and directed by Hal Hartley
- "Meanwhile" (Futurama), the final episode in the seventh season of the American animated television series Futurama

== See also ==
- Meantime (disambiguation)
- Mean (disambiguation)
- While (disambiguation)
