= Meen (surname) =

Meen is a surname. Notable people with the surname include:

- Arthur Meen (1924–2008), Canadian politician
- Henry Meen (1744–1817), English cleric and classicist
- Margaret Meen (1751–1824), English watercolour painter
- Reggie Meen (1907–1984), British boxer

== See also ==
- Ignatius Mortimer Meen, antagonist of the 1995 fantasy educational DOS video game I. M. Meen
- McMeen, similar surname
