= Ordine (disambiguation) =

Nuccio Ordine (1958–2023) was an Italian literary critic and professor of Italian literature

Ordine may also refer to:

- Ordine Nero, Italian fascist organization founded in 1974
- Ordine Nuovo, Italian far right cultural, political and paramilitary organization founded in 1956

== See also ==
- Orders, decorations, and medals of Italy
- Orders, decorations, and medals of the Holy See
- Religious order (Catholic)
