= Meantime =

Meantime or mean time may refer to:

== Time ==
- Greenwich Mean Time, the mean solar time at the Royal Observatory, Greenwich in England: often used to refer to Coordinated Universal Time
- Local mean time, a form of solar time that corrects the variations of local apparent time
- Washington Mean Time, the time at the meridian through the center of the old dome atop the main building at the old US Naval Observatory at Washington, D.C., U.S.A.

== Entertainment ==
- Meantime (film), the 1983 film by Mike Leigh
- Meantime (video game), a cancelled video game
- Meantime (album), the second album and major-label debut by Helmet, released in 1992
- "Meantime", a 2007 song by Beatsteaks
- "Meantime", a song by The Futureheads from their album The Futureheads
- "Mean Time", a prize-winning poetry collection by British poet laureate Carol Ann Duffy
- Meantime (EP), a 2012 EP by Kwes

== Literature ==
- Meantime (novel), a 2022 novel by Frankie Boyle

== Engineering and mechanics ==
- Mean time between failure, the "average" time between failures, the reciprocal of the failure rate in the special case when failure rate is constant
- Mean time between outages, the mean time between equipment failures that result in loss of system continuity or unacceptable degradation
- Mean time to recovery, the average time that a device will take to recover from a non-terminal failure
- Mean free time, the average time between collisions between interacting particles

== Business ==
- Meantime Brewing, a craft brewer of speciality beers

== See also ==
- In the Meantime (disambiguation)
- Meanwhile (disambiguation)
- Mean (disambiguation)
- Time (disambiguation)
