= Meena Kumari (disambiguation) =

Meena Kumari (1933–1972) was an Indian actress.

Meena Kumari may also refer to:

- Meena Kumari (sport shooter) (born 1983), an Indian sport shooter
- Meena Kumari (weightlifter) (born 1994), an Indian weightlifter
- Meena Kumari (book), biography of actress Meena Kumari written by Vinod Mehta
