= Means (surname) =

Means is a surname. Notable people with the surname include:

- Amanda Means (born 1945), American artist
- Bub Means (born 2001), American football player
- Carey Means (born 1966), American voice actor
- Dave Means (born 1952), American football player
- David Means (born 1961), American writer
- Eldred Kurtz Means (1878–1957), American clergyman
- Elizabeth Means (born 2002), Filipino American basketball player
- Gardiner Means (1896–1988), American economist
- Gaston Means (1879–1938), American private detective, bootlegger, and con artist
- Jessica Means, American politician
- Jimmy Means (born 1950), American race car driver and owner
- John Means (disambiguation), multiple people
- Marianne Means (1934–2017), American political journalist
- Natrone Means (born 1972), American football player
- Philip Ainsworth Means (1892–1944), American-born anthropologist and historian
- Rice W. Means (1877–1949), Republican United States Senator from Colorado
- Russell Means (1939–2012), American activist
- Samuel C. Means (1828–1891) Virginian partisan in the American Civil War and lead the Loudoun Rangers
- Tim Means (environmentalist) (1944–2019), American Mexican Environmentalist

== See also ==
- Means (disambiguation)
