= Meena (disambiguation) =

Meena is a tribe mainly found in Rajasthan, India.

Meena may also refer to:

== People ==
=== As a given name ===
- Meena (actress) (born 1976), South Indian actress known as Meena Durairaj
- Meena (Malayalam actress) (1941–1997), Indian actress in Malayalam movies
- Meena Ganesh (1942–2024), Indian actress who acted mostly in Malayalam movies
- Meena Harris (born 1984), American lawyer and children's book author, niece of U.S. Vice President Kamala Harris
- Meena Kandasamy (born 1984), emerging poet, fiction writer, and translator and activist with the Dalit Panthers of India
- Meena Kapoor (1930–2017), Indian singer of the 1940s
- Meena Keshwar Kamal (1956–1987), Afghan feminist
- Meena Khadikar, Indian composer and daughter of Deenanath Mangeshkar
- Meena Kumari (1933–1972), Indian-Hindi film actress
- Meena Kumari (sport shooter) (born 1983), Indian sport shooter
- Meena Kumari (weightlifter) (born 1994), Indian weightlifter
- Meena Lee (born 1981), South Korean professional golfer
- Meena Rana, Indian singer
- Meena Shah (1937–2015), Indian badminton player

=== As a surname ===
- Arjunlal Meena, Indian politician
- C. K. Meena, Indian journalist and novelist
- Chhuttan Lal Meena, Indian Politician
- Golma Devi Meena, Indian politician
- Gopal Meena, Indian politician
- Gopi Chand Meena, Indian politician
- Harish Meena, Indian politician
- James Meena (born 1951), American conductor and opera administrator
- Jaskaur Meena (born 1947), Indian politician
- Kanwar Lal Meena, Indian politician
- Kirodi Lal Meena, Indian politician
- Mamta Meena, Indian politician
- Mool Chand Meena, Indian politician
- Murari Lal Meena, Indian politician
- Namo Narain Meena (born 1943), Indian politician
- Nand Lal Meena (born 1936), Indian politician from Baran district, Rajasthan
- Nand Lal Meena (born 1946), Indian politician, former cabinet minister in the Government of Rajasthan
- Phool Singh Meena, Indian politician
- Raghuveer Meena (born 1959), Indian politician
- Ramesh Chand Meena (born 1963), Indian politician
- Samrath Lal Meena, Indian politician
- Shyam Lal Meena (1965–2026), Indian archer
- Ramkesh Meena, Indian politician

== Fictional characters ==
- Meena (character), from the South Asian television series Meena
- Meena, one of the main characters of the film Sing
- Meena Jutla, from the British soap opera Emmerdale
- Arjun Meena, a fictional Indian Customs Service officer in the TV series Taskaree: The Smuggler's Web, portrayed by Emraan Hashmi

== Other ==
- Meena (film), a 2014 American documentary film
- "Meena" (song), a 2014 single by Saif Samejo
- Meena (1993 TV series), a South Asian children's animated television series
- Meena (2023 TV series), an Indian Tamil-language television series
- Meena Bazaar

== See also ==
- Mena (disambiguation)
- Mina (disambiguation)
- Meen (disambiguation)
- Myna, bird
- Meenavar, fishing castes of Tamil Nadu, India
