= Patty Prather Thum =

Painter and art critic (1853–1926)

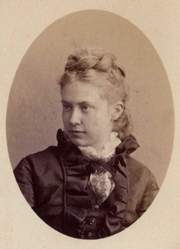
- Born: October 1, 1853; Louisville, Kentucky, U.S.
- Died: September 28, 1926 (aged 72); Louisville, Kentucky, U.S.
- Education: Vassar College; Art Students League of New York; William Merritt Chase; Henry Mobray; Lemuel Wiles; Thomas Eakins
- Known for: Painting

Patty Prather Thum (October 1, 1853 – September 28, 1926) was an American artist from Louisville, Kentucky known for her landscapes, paintings of roses, and book illustrations. She studied art at Vassar College and the Art Students League of New York and maintained a portrait and landscape studio in Louisville for 35 years. She taught art, illustrated books and magazines, was an inventor, served as the president of the Louisville Art League, member of the Louisville Women's Club, and was the art critic for the Louisville Herald until 1925.

== Early life and education ==
Patty Prather Thum, daughter of prominent Louisville doctor Mandeville Thum and Louisiana (Miller) Thum, was born in Louisville, Kentucky on October 1, 1853. She was first tutored in drawing by her mother. As a child, Thum visited her grandparents at their rural home and developed a "love of nature". Thum studied art at Vassar College with Henry Van Ingen, becoming one of the first Kentucky graduates. Thum studied with William Merritt Chase, Henry Mobray, and Lemuel Wiles at the Art Students League of New York. At the Student's Guild of the Brooklyn Art Association she studied under Thomas Eakins. In the mid-1870s, Thum moved back to Louisville and began a career as a painter.

== Career ==
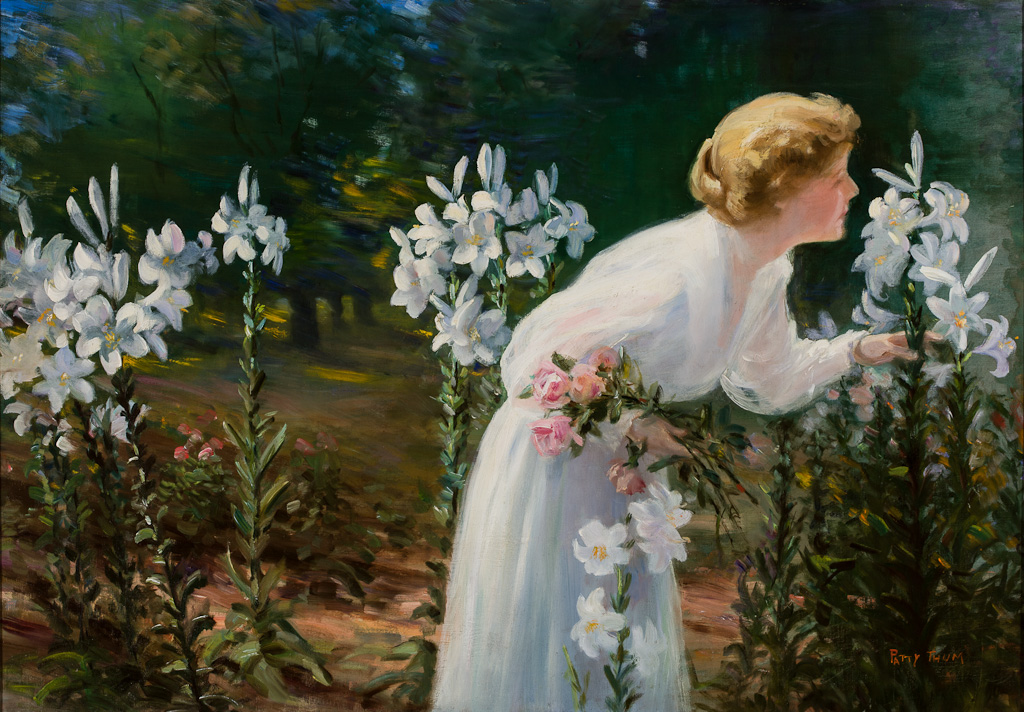
Patty Prather Thum, The Lady of the Lilies, c. 1910, oil on canvas, Speed Art Museum

Thum had an art studio at the Francis Building in Louisville for over 35 years. She is most well known for her landscape painting, mostly of flowers and Kentucky scenes, but also painted still-lifes and portraits. She also contributed to art magazines and newspapers. She painted private gardens in Jefferson and Oldham Counties with native trees being a focus of her work. Thum was a member of several art organizations, including the Louisville Art Association, the Art Association of Indianapolis, the American Federation of Art, and the Arts Club. Thum received an honorable mention for book illustration of "Robbie and Annie: A Child's Story" at the 1893 World's Columbian Exposition in Chicago. Thum also served as art director of the 1921 Kentucky State Fair.

== Personal life and death ==
After an illness of several months, Thum died at her home in Louisville at the age of seventy-two on September 28, 1926.

== Exhibitions ==
- Southern Exposition, Louisville, 1883
- 1893 World's Columbian Exposition, Chicago, 1893
- New York State Fair, Albany, 1898
- Saint Louis Exposition, St. Louis, 1904
- Paintings by Patty Thum, Indianapolis Museum of Art, 1909

Posthumous

- Kentucky Expatriates, Owensboro KY, 1984
- Kentucky Women Artists: 1850-2000, Owensboro Museum of Fine Arts and Western Kentucky University, Bowling Green, 2001
- Patty Thum, Howard Steamboat Museum, Jeffersonville IN, 2009

== Gallery ==
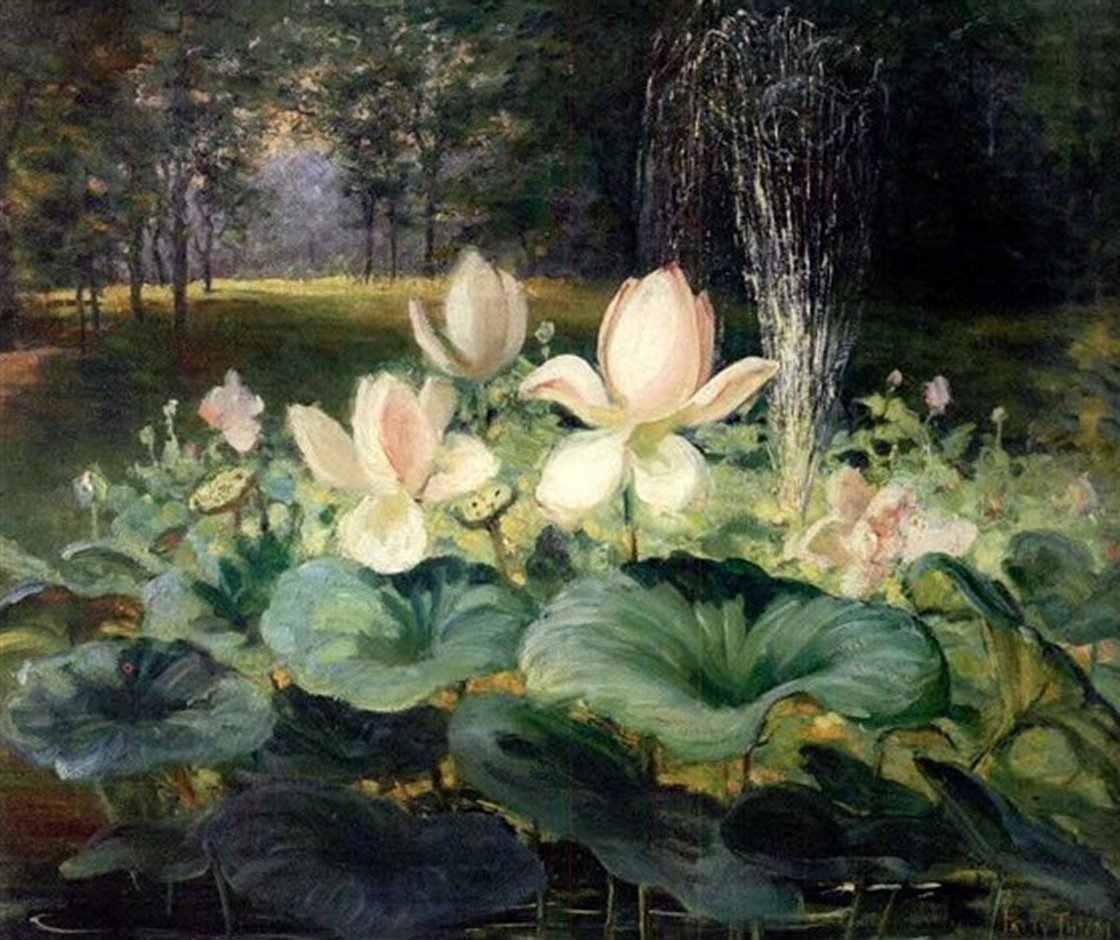
The Fountain by Patty Prather Thum

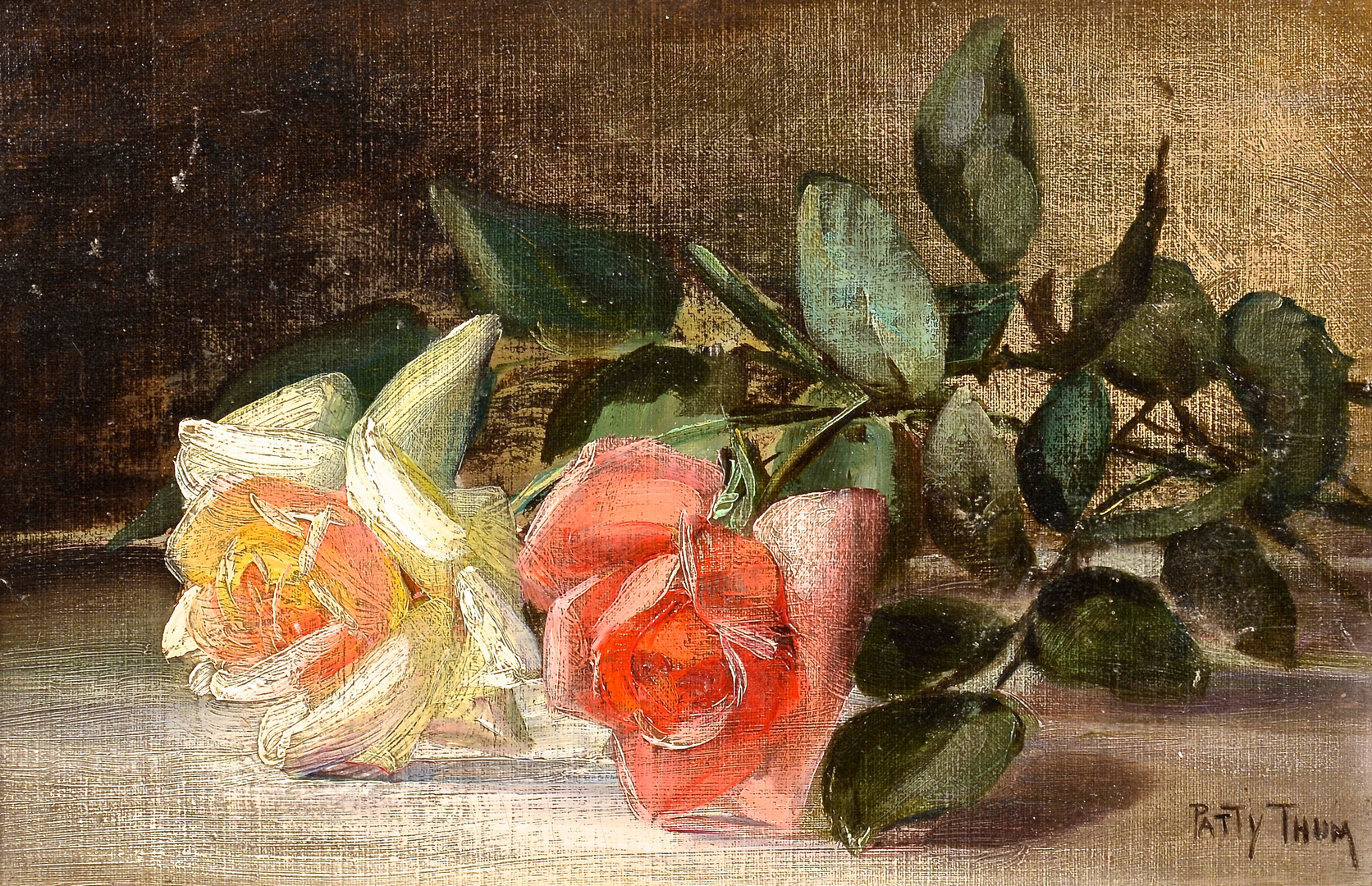
Still Life with Two Roses by Patty Prather Thum, 1870
