= Wile =

Wile may refer to:

== People ==
- John Wile (born 1947), English football player and manager
- Matt Wile (born 1992), American football player

== Arts, entertainment, and media ==
- WILE (AM), a radio station (1270 AM) licensed to Cambridge, Ohio, United States
- WILE-FM, a radio station (97.7 FM) licensed to Byesville, Ohio, United States
- Wile E. Coyote, a character of Looney Tunes

== Other uses ==
- M. Wile and Company Factory Building, in Buffalo, NY, USA
- Wile Cup, a croquet trophy initiated at the University of British Columbia

== See also ==
- While (disambiguation)
- Wiles (disambiguation)
