= Henry Meen =

Henry Meen (1744–1817) was an English cleric, academic and classical scholar. He is best known as authority on Lycophron.

== Life ==
He was born at Harleston, Norfolk on 2 December 1744, the son of Henry and Sarah Meen, an apothecary. He went to school in Bungay. He entered Emmanuel College, Cambridge as a sizar on 9 October 1761, and graduated B.A. 1766, M.A. 1769, and B.D. 1776. He became a Fellow of his college.

Ordained in the Church of England, Meen was appointed to a minor canonry in St Paul's Cathedral; instituted to the rectory of St Nicholas Cole Abbey with St Nicholas Olave, London, on 30 April 1792; and collated on 13 November 1795 as prebendary of Twyford in St Paul's Cathedral, where he also held the office of lecturer. He died at the rectory, Bread Street Hill, London, 3 January 1817, aged 72. His younger sister was the painter Margaret Meen and he assisted her career when she moved to London in 1770.

== Works ==
Meen published, while an undergraduate, a poem in blank verse, called Happiness, a Poetical Essay, London, 1766, which he later disowned.

In 1780 Meen completed and saw through the press the unfinished translation of Apollonius Rhodius, by Francis Fawkes, and superintended its publication for the widow's benefit. To it he annexed his own independent version of the Rape of Helen, or the Origin of the Trojan War, by Coluthus, which was afterwards included in the Works of the Greek and Roman Poets (vol. v.), the British Poets (vol. lxxxviii.), and in the collections of Robert Anderson and Alexander Chalmers. His other works were:

- A Sermon before the Association of Volunteers, 1782;
- Remarks on the Cassandra of Lycophron: a Monody, 1800;
- Succisivæ Operæ; or, Selections from Ancient Writers, with Translations and Notes, 1815.

His criticisms on Lycophron appeared in the European Magazine from 1796 to 1813, but his complete translation was never published, and was sold with his books and manuscripts by Sotheby on 17 March 1817 and four following days.

== Reputation ==
Gilbert Wakefield described Meen as "pacific, gentle, unassuming," and speaks of him as having studied the writings of Lycophron more than any man living.

The title of "Little Meen" was applied to him by George Steevens, who described him as "confused and irregular in all his undertakings", learned but desultory. When Meen told Samuel Parr that he purposed undertaking an edition of Lycophron's works, Parr remarked that "many books have been well edited by men who were no scholars."

== Associations ==
Meen corrected the proofs of Thomas Percy's lost work Blank Verse before Milton, which was destroyed in the fire at the printing-office of Messrs. Nichols. Many letters from him to Percy are in Nichols's Illustrations of Literature (vii. 38–68). He was employed to collect and pass through the press a volume of poems, Alonzo and Cora, by Elizabeth Scot (1729–1789) of Edinburgh, which came out in 1801. James Peller Malcolm when engaged in compiling his Londinium Redivivum, obtained through Meen permission to consult the archives of St Paul's Cathedral.
