= Joshua Smith (English politician) =

British politician

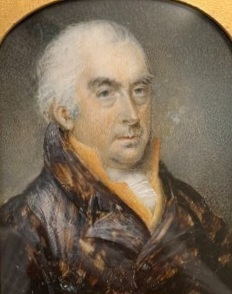
Joshua Smith

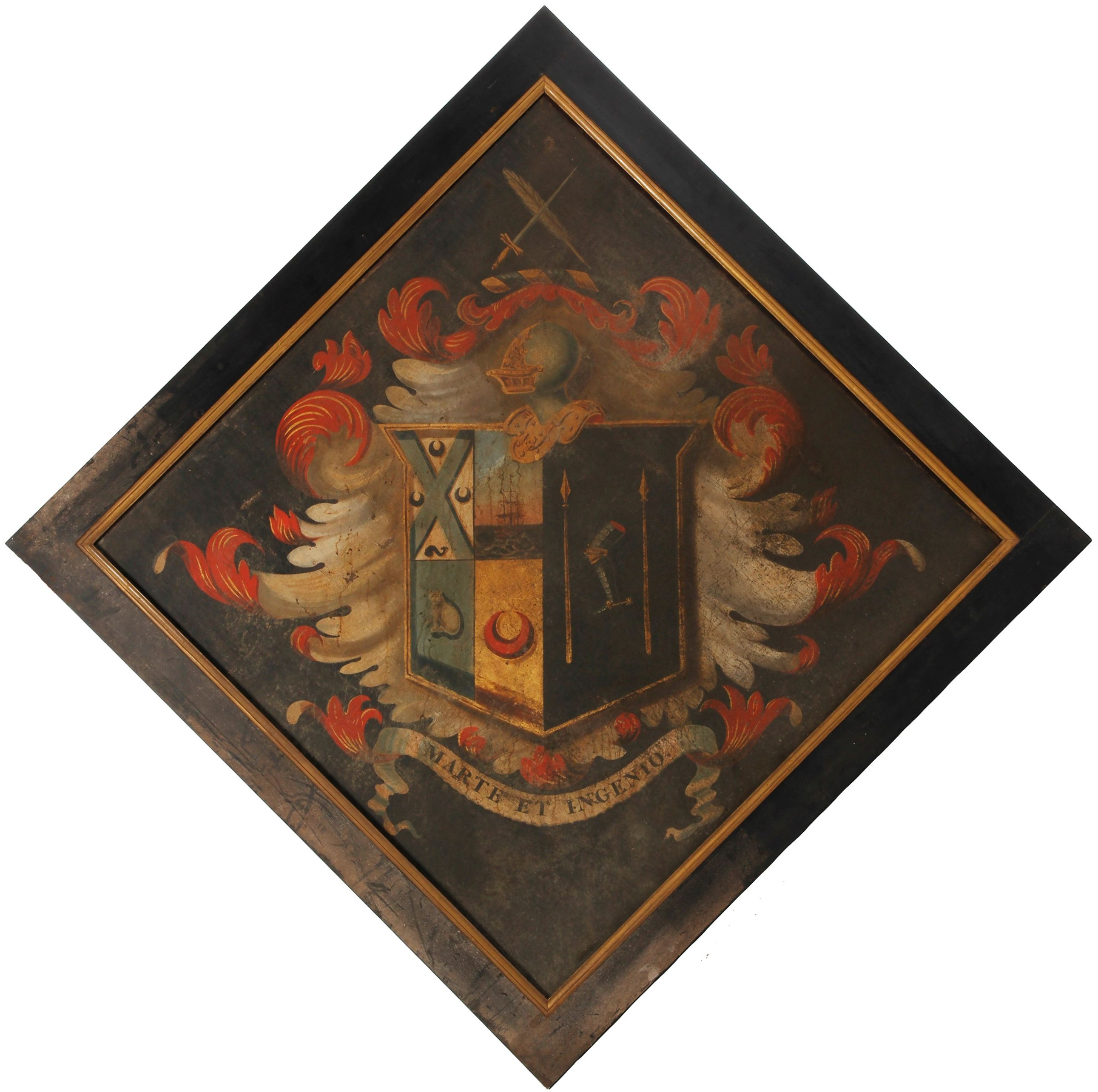
An armorial hatchment with the coat of arms of Joshua Smith (1732-1819), of Erlestoke, displaying his arms impaling the paternal arms of his wife, Sarah Gilbert, 1819.

Joshua Smith (1732 – 20 March 1819) was an English merchant and politician.

He was born the son of John Smith, a Lambeth merchant and became a timber merchant himself. He lived at Erlestoke Park, near Devizes, Wiltshire. He became a director of the East India Company in 1771, and was Member of Parliament (MP) for Devizes from 1788 to 1818, although not an active member.

In 1766 he married Sarah, the daughter of Nathaniel Gilbert, judge and member of the legislative council of Antigua, with whom he had four daughters. They employed the painter Margaret Meenas their daughter's drawing instructor. Their eldest daughter Maria married in 1787 Charles Compton, 1st Marquess of Northampton.

Smith died on 20 March 1819. Subsequently, his Erlestoke seat was sold to George Watson-Taylor. Smith's library was sold at auction by Edward Jeffery on 25 May 1820 and eight following days, in 1671 lots. Two copies of the catalogue exist at Cambridge University Library, one of them annotated in a contemporary hand "offered to G. Watson Taylor Esq. MP for £2500 – sold for upwards of £4000", suggesting the library was offered to Watson Taylor too, but that he declined to acquire it.

== See also ==
- Spencer-Smith Baronets

Parliament of Great Britain
Preceded by Henry Addington and Sir James Tylney-Long	Member of Parliament for Devizes; 1788–1800; With: Henry Addington	Succeeded by Parliament of the United Kingdom
Parliament of the United Kingdom
Preceded by Parliament of Great Britain	Member of Parliament for Devizes; 1801–1818; With: Henry Addington, to 1805; Thomas Grimston Estcourt, from 1805	Succeeded by Thomas Grimston Estcourt and John Pearse
