= Peconic, New York =

- Hamlet and census-designated place
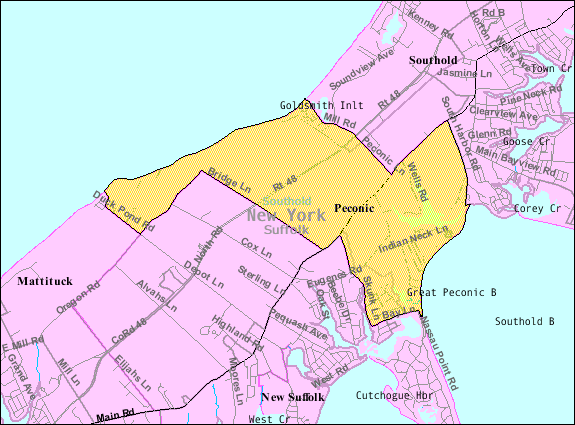

- Location within New York
- Coordinates: 41°1′50″N 72°27′36″W
- Country: United States
- State: New York
- County: Suffolk
- Town: Southold

Area
  - Total: 4.56 sq mi (11.80 km^{2})
  - Land: 3.33 sq mi (8.62 km^{2})
  - Water: 1.23 sq mi (3.18 km^{2})
- Elevation: 30 ft (9 m)

Population (2020)
  - Total: 692
  - Density: 207.9/sq mi (80.27/km^{2})
- Time zone: UTC-5 (Eastern (EST))
  - Summer (DST): UTC-4 (EDT)
- ZIP code: 11958
- Area code: 631
- FIPS code: 36-56968
- GNIS feature ID: 0960091

Peconic is a census-designated place (CDP) that roughly corresponds to the hamlet by the same name in the Town of Southold in Suffolk County, New York, United States. As of the 2020 census, Peconic had a population of 692.

== History ==
The community derives its name from Peconic Bay, which in turn derives its name from a Native American word meaning "nut trees". The area was originally called "Hermitage", and the name "Peconic" was adopted later. During the late 1800s and early 1900s, it was home to the Peconic School, an artist colony initially led by painters Benjamin Rutherfurd Fitz, Edward August Bell, Henry Prellwitz and Edith Mitchill Prellwitz. Albert Einstein was staying in Peconic in 1939 when he signed the famous Einstein–Szilárd letter to President Franklin Delano Roosevelt. Goldsmith's Inlet was the site of a tidal mill that was improved with a windmill in 1870.

== Geography ==
According to the United States Census Bureau, the hamlet has a total area of 3.5 square miles (9.1 km^{2}), of which 3.4 square miles (8.8 km^{2}) is land and 0.12 square miles (0.3 km^{2}), or 3.58%, is water.

Historical population
| Census | Pop. | Note | %± |
|---|---|---|---|
| 2020 | 692 | | — |
U.S. Decennial Census

== Demographics ==
As of the census of 2000, there were 1,081 people, 426 households, and 310 families residing in the CDP. The population density was 223.8 inhabitants per square mile (86.4/km^{2}). There were 682 housing units at an average density of 141.2 per square mile (54.5/km^{2}). The racial makeup of the community was 94.45% White, 0.93% African American, 1.11% Asian, 2.41% from other races, and 1.11% from two or more races. Hispanic or Latino of any race were 3.61% of the population.

There were 426 households, out of which 27.7% had children under the age of 18 living with them, 62.7% were married couples living together, 7.5% had a female householder with no husband present, and 27.0% were non-families. 22.1% of all households were made up of individuals, and 10.8% had someone living alone who was 65 years of age or older. The average household size was 2.54 and the average family size was 2.98.

In the CDP, the population was spread out, with 22.9% under the age of 18, 4.7% from 18 to 24, 24.4% from 25 to 44, 30.5% from 45 to 64, and 17.4% who were 65 years of age or older. The median age was 44 years. For every 100 females, there were 93.0 males. For every 100 females age 18 and over, there were 92.4 males.

The median income for a household in the community was $52,368, and the median income for a family was $60,956. Males had a median income of $49,167 versus $45,769 for females. The per capita income for the CDP was $24,343. About 1.5% of families and 3.2% of the population were below the poverty line, including 1.6% of those under age 18 and 2.7% of those age 65 or over.

== Schools ==
- Mattituck-Cutchogue Union Free School District (small western portion of CDP of Peconic)
- Southold Union Free School District (eastern part of CDP of Peconic)

== Notable person ==
Painter Benjamin Rutherford Fitz was raised in Peconic. He died there in 1891.
