= John Means =

John Means may refer to:

- John Means (baseball) (born 1993), American baseball pitcher
- John Means (businessman) (1829–1910), mayor of Ashland, Kentucky
- John Means (comedian), stand-up comedian
- John Barkley Means (born 1939), American professor
- John Hugh Means (1812–1862), governor of South Carolina
