= Benjamin Rutherford Fitz =

American painter

- Born: February 2, 1855; New York, New York, United States
- Died: December 27, 1891 (aged 36); Peconic, New York, United States
- Education: Art Students League of New York; National Academy Museum
- Style: Landscape painting
- Spouse: Harriett R. Fanning

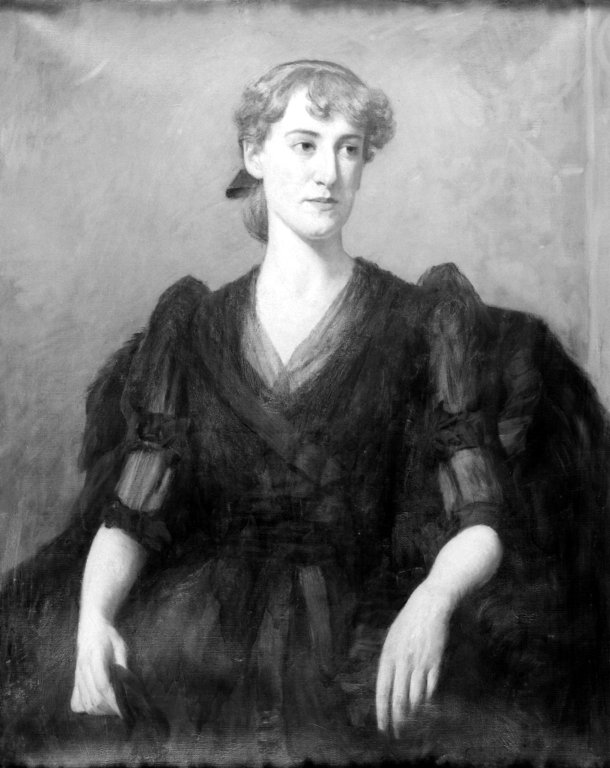
Portrait of Edwina M. Post by Benjamin Rutherford Fitz, 1890–91, in the collection of the Brooklyn Museum

Benjamin Rutherford Fitz (1855–1891) was an American artist.

== Early life and education ==
Fitz was born in New York, New York in 1855. In 1868 his father died and his family moved to Peconic, New York. Starting in 1877, he studied art at the National Academy Museum. He studied there until 1880, when he briefly studied at the Art Students League of New York. That same year, he relocated to Munich, Germany. In Munich, he studied under Ludwig von Löfftz.

== Career and mid-life ==
Fitz returned to the United States in 1884. He painted The Reflection, which depicts a pond with a nude woman standing at the edge of the pond. The piece is credited with helping popularize the nude figure as a main subject in painting. The National Academy Museum named The Reflection his "most famous work."

Fitz exhibited at the National Academy seven times. When not painting, he sailed, often with his friend Dwight William Tryon.

He married Harriet R. Fanning (1857-1935) in April, 1889.

== Death ==
Fitz died in 1891. He was buried in Willow Hill Cemetery in Southold, New York.

== Notable collections ==
- A Pool in the Forest, oil on canvas, 1909; Smithsonian American Art Museum
- Portrait of Edwina M. Post, oil on canvas, 1890–91; Brooklyn Museum
