= Wile Cup =

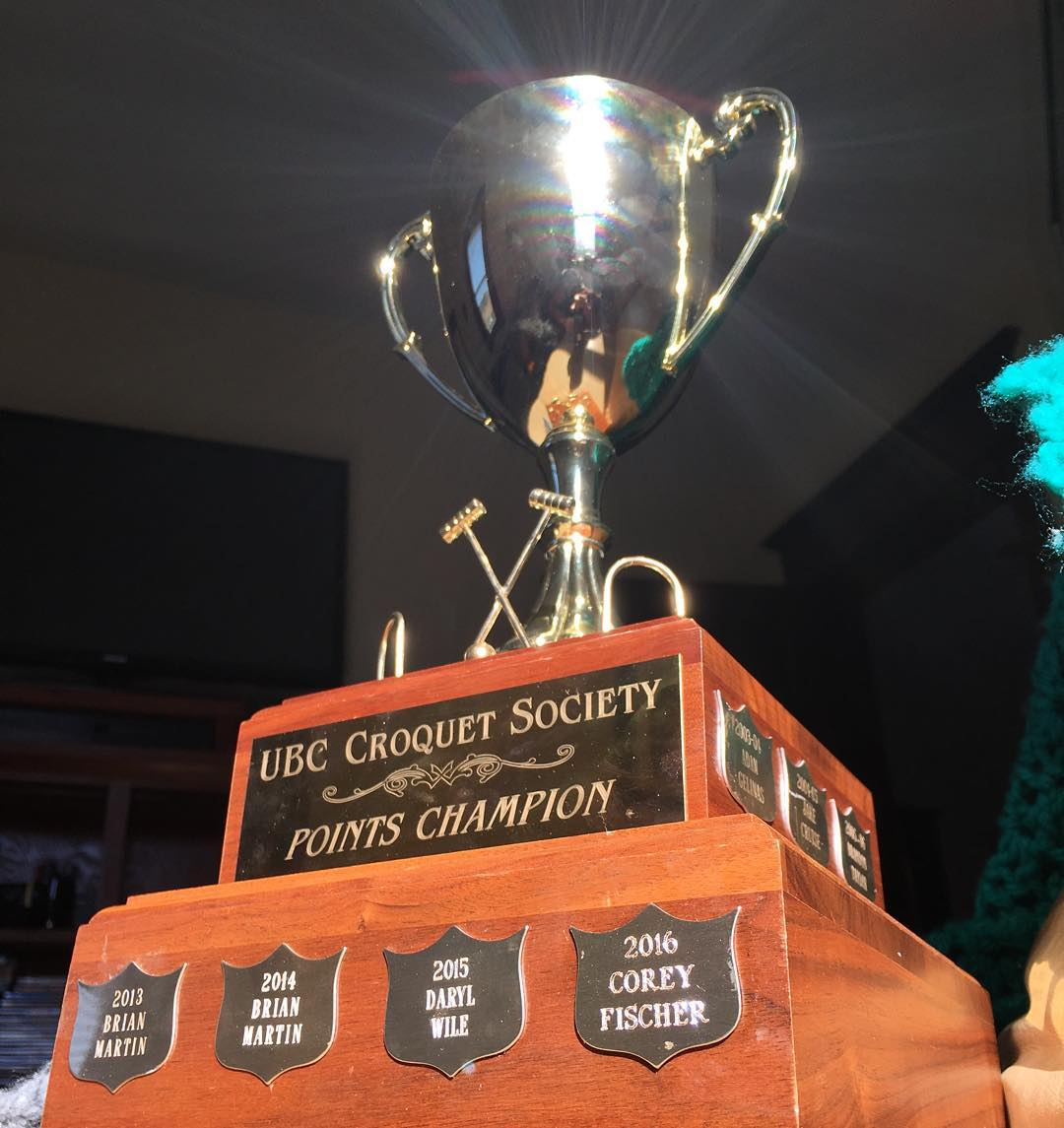
- Awarded for: winning the Wile Cup Championship
- First award: 2004
- Final award: 2019
- Currently held by: Ben Park

The Wile Cup is a trophy awarded annually to a group of croquet enthusiasts. Formerly the championship trophy for the University of British Columbia's Croquet Society club (Croqsoc), the Wile Cup has since become an annual recreational award. It is named after Croqsoc founder and inaugural club president, Daryl Wile. The tournament which the trophy is played for is also known as the Wile Cup.

The Wile Cup was purchased by the club in 2004, to be presented to the player who earned the most points in tournament play during the 2003-04 Winter semester. The Cup received its moniker the following school year, when President Corey Fischer christened the trophy in honour of the Croquet Society's founding father.

== UBC Era ==
September 7, 2003: On a day-trip to the U.S., Wile, Fischer, and co-founder Kevin Nickel, discussed the idea of formulating a croquet club through the UBC Alma Mater Society (AMS), the school's student society. Upon returning to Canada, Wile recruited other close friends and roommates to join his Executive Board, the would-be operating council of the club. After Wile filed the necessary paperwork with the AMS and completed an in-person discussion on the merits of having a croquet club at UBC, the Croquet Society of the Alma Mater Society was born on September 14, 2003.

The Executive Board created four tournaments to be played during the school year, with each tournament's format to be a different variation of croquet. The Autumn Classic became the first tournament of the year, played on a standard 9-wicket backyard course. Team-play was featured at the November Reign competition, with players randomly grouped into 3-person teams, playing other threesomes head-to-head. The third tournament involved rough terrain and obstacles, and was deemed to be "extreme" croquet. The Masters of the University was Croqsoc's final tournament of the school year, played on a six-wicket Oxford style interweaving course. Club members earned points at each tournament, based on their performance. At the end of the year, the player who accumulated the most points became the club champion.

=== 2003-04: First Victory ===
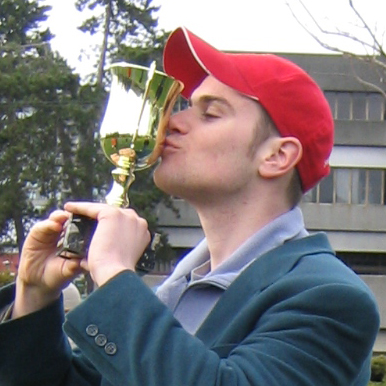
2003-04 Champion Adam Gelinas

The inaugural Wile Cup champion was determined by the outcome of the final tournament of the year, the Masters of the University. Adam Gelinas, runner-up at the Autumn Classic and November Reign team tournament, finally broke through and captured the Masters title, and with it, the coveted Green Jacket. Stephanie Janzen, making her Croqsoc debut, stunned the field by not only qualifying for the Final round, but by capturing second place. Her runner-up finish, coupled with tournament-favourite Chris Van Kleeck placing 3rd, assured Gelinas the inaugural Wile Cup Championship by just 1 point.

=== 2004-05: Second Season ===
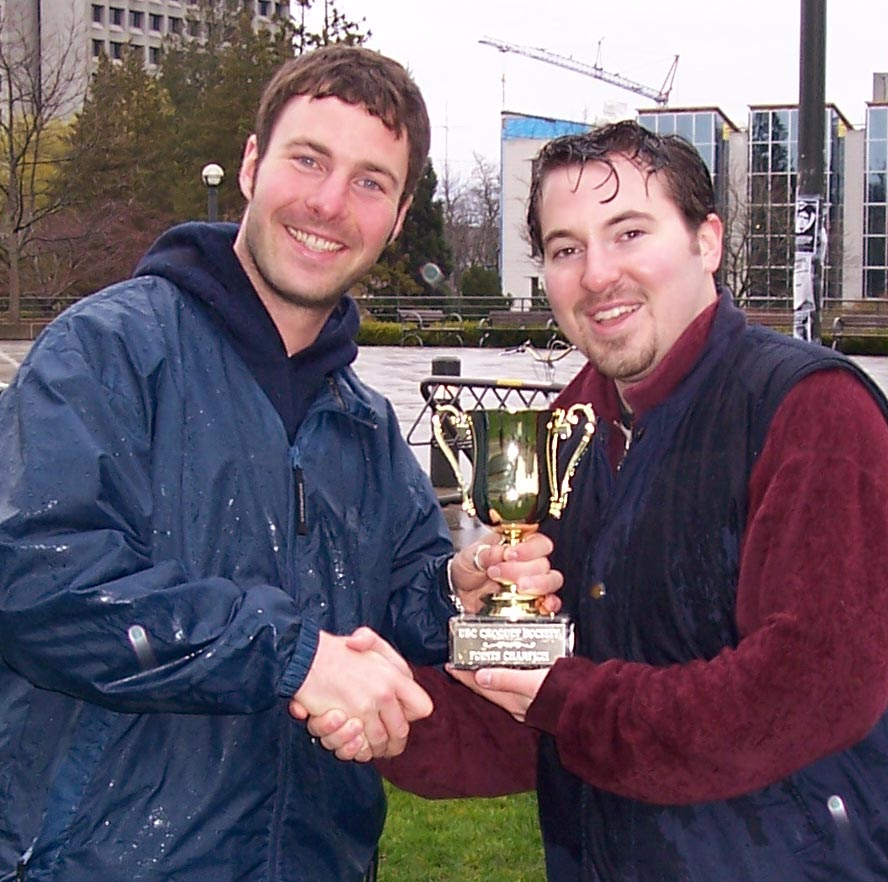
2004-05 Champion Jake Cruise with President Corey Fischer.

A new Wile Cup champion would be crowned in Croqsoc's second season, as Gelinas had graduated and would not be able to defend his title. President Wile had also graduated, allowing Fischer to step up from Vice-President and lead the club. The new season may have brought in a crop of hopefuls to mix in with the sophomore players, but it opened identically as the previous campaign, with Van Kleeck again taking the Autumn Classic tournament. After he was victorious at November Reign II, it looked like the Wile Cup was a lock for Van Kleeck. However, by the time the Masters of the University came around, it was a three-horse race to the finish. Jacob E. Cruise led in the points standings with 23, followed by Erica Drake (22) and Van Kleeck (21). Incredibly, first-round collapses by Drake and Van Kleeck kept them out of vying for the Cup in the final, automatically awarding Cruise the club championship even before the final round. By finishing in 4th, Cruise also became the first player to win the Wile Cup without having won a single tournament.

=== 2005-06: Out With the Old ===
For the third consecutive year, the Wile Cup would be captured by a new player. Cruise graduated following the previous season, opening the door for a new points champion. Following the Xtreme Challenge (the third tournament of the year), Dylan Gunn and Brandon Taylor were tied in the standings with 24 points, with no one close enough to pose a threat. Taylor had been the runner-up position in all three tournaments leading into the Masters, besting Gunn at the Autumn Classic and Xtreme. It was Gunn's team victory at November Reign III that raised his point total. Neither man played exceptionally well in the final round, but in the end it was Taylor that was able to shed the bridesmaid label and claim the coveted Cup by one point. Taylor, who would be replacing President Fischer the following September, became the first Croqsoc president with his name on the Wile Cup.

=== 2006-07: The New Class ===
The opening of the 2006-07 school year marked a new chapter in the Croquet Society. With the graduation of Fischer the previous Spring, the second generation of Croqsoc had begun. President Brandon Taylor had taken over the reins, and looked to carry on the tradition. Though the last of the founders were gone, the fierce competition for Wile's Cup remained. After three tournaments, five players were all within striking distance for the championship; Martin Bradshaw, Kendra Brown, Keegan Bursaw, Mike "Pool Party" Wilton, and Taylor. Taylor failed to repeat as champion, and it was Wilton who walked away victorious, and once again, a new name was etched on the Wile Cup.

=== 2007-08: Croq 2.1 ===
The second year of the new generation unfolded eerily similar to the previous season; after three tournaments, there was no clear-cut favorite to the Wile Cup, and five challengers had a shot at winning it. The most likely bet to win would have been Roger Pylypa; however, a first-round knockout at the Masters eliminated his chances. Vice-President Bradshaw successfully repeated as champion, capturing his second Green Jacket, and surpassed Pylypa in the standings by a single point. However, it was Croqsoc rookie Chris Amy who would sour Bradshaw's victory. Amy secured the runner-up position, vaulting him past Pylypa and Bradshaw to the top of the standings, and became the newly crowned Wile Cup Champion.

=== 2008-09: Winds of Change ===
The winds of change were again blowing at the UBC campus. President Taylor had passed the torch to Bradshaw, who became the fourth Croqsoc head. His first order of business, however, was to capture the Autumn Classic championship. He could not continue his stellar run atop the leader board, unfortunately, and by year's end, was all but out of Wile Cup contention. At the Masters, it was a two-man race between Bursaw and Wilton. In the final round, Bursaw finished second, ahead of Wilton, and won the Wile Cup, 34 points to 31 (ironically, 2 years earlier, Wilton beat Bursaw to the Wile Cup by the same score).

==== Croqsoc Not Renewed ====
The club's application for renewal was not submitted, and with that, the Croquet Society of the AMS folded.

== Modern Era ==
Upon hearing about the fate of the club, former president Corey Fischer couldn't let the tradition established seven years prior disappear forever. In order to keep the spirit alive, he needed the beacon of Croqsoc; the Wile Cup. Having remained in touch with some of the members of Croqsoc, Fischer contacted Bursaw, and explained his desire to keep the memory of the club going. Bursaw was more than happy to return the Cup. Now in possession of the trophy, Fischer ultimately wanted to continue the Cup's annual awarding. He decided that the most fitting way to do this would be to inaugurate a tournament for UBC Croqsoc alumnus and friends.

=== Monck Park 2010 ===
The first tournament in the new era of Croqsoc was held August 7, 2010, at Monck Provincial Park campground. The tournament was the focal point of a UBC reunion of sorts, comprising most of the original Executive Board, as well as friends, spouses and partners.

2010 Tournament Table
Round 1 (Butterfly)			Round 2 (Xtreme)			Championship (Traditional)	
Match A	Match B	Match C	Match D	Match E	Match F^{†}	Match G	
Yvonne (2)	Daryl (5)	Alison (3)	Pak^{w}	Alison (3)	Robin	Brian Martin (20)	2nd
Michelle (4)	Colin (7)	Kevin (10)	Kevin (4)	Terrah (5)	Julie	Jake Cruise^{k} (14)	5th
Julie (3)	Pak (3)	Jake (4)	Colin (7)	Nathan (4)	Jake (10)	Kevin Nickel (14)	3rd
Qiang (5)	-	Nathan (7)	Adam (10)	Brian (10)	Michelle	Corey Fischer (15)	1st
Adam (7)	Brian (10)	Robin (5)	Qiang (3)	-	Daryl^{k}	Adam Gelinas^{k} (17)	6th
Corey (10)	Terrah (2)	-	Corey (5)	Yvonne (7)	-	Colin Olson (14)	4th

Table colour refers to which ball a player used
^{k}Staked Out | ^{w}Withdrew | ^{†}Match results unnecessary after Jake clinched

=== Kamloops 2011 ===
Wile Cup Champion Jake Cruise (2004–05) offered to host the tournament in his city of Kamloops, BC. Having moved to the interior in late 2009 and into his current home in 2010, it was an opportunity to provide hospitality to the championship's contestants.

The 2011 tournament was held on July 2 and had three distinct differences than the previous years'; the opening round matches were played under the six-wicket "Oxford" format, the second round "Xtreme" style was played in a completely different locale (Jake's family cabin at Stump Lake), and a 3-person playoff was needed to determine the final 2 places for the championship round.

2011 Tournament Table
Round 1 (Oxford)			Round 2 (Xtreme)			Championship (Traditional)
Match A	Match B	Match C	Match D	Match E	Match F	Match G
Colin (5)	Laura (4)	Candace (5)	Terrah (5)	Michelle (4)	Katherine (4)	Peter (17)
Robin (10)	Peter (10)	Jake (10)	Laura (10)	Peter (7)	Kevin (7)	Robin (20)
-	-	-	-	-	-	Candace (15) ^{2nd}
Michelle (4)	Katherine (5)	Terrah (4)	Curtis (3)	Candace (10)	Jake (5)	Jake (15)
Julie (3)	Curtis (7)	Kevin (7)	Julie (4)	Colin (5)	Robin (10)	^{p}Corey (14) ^{1st}
Corey (7)	-	-	Corey (7)	-	-	^{p}Kevin (14)

^{p}Qualified via sudden death playoff between Kevin, Corey and Laura (all tied with 14 points after preliminary rounds).

=== Surrey 2012 ===
A long-held dream of the Croqsoc Executive board was to play a match at Peace Arch Park international border crossing; it became reality one unforgettable Labour Day Sunday.

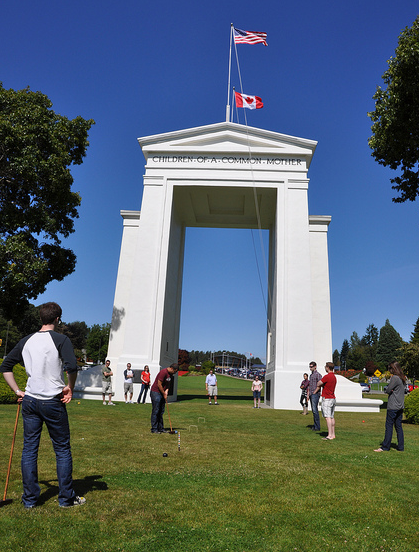
First Croqsoc match played on foreign land.

The participants gathered to play Round 1 at the Canada/US, Surrey/Blaine border.

The Xtreme round was challenged in Bear Creek Park in Surrey, a multi-use municipal park.

The Final location and accompanying after-party was hosted by Ernie & Sharon Bortolin, Kevin's in-laws, and parents of Mike and our late-friend Terrah.

2012 Tournament Table
Round 1 (Traditional)		Round 2 (Xtreme)		Championship (Oxford)	
Match A	Match B	Match C	Match D	Match E	
Robin (4)	Brian (7)	Robin (4)	Kevin (6)	Daryl (13)	^{2nd}
Mike (10)	Nathan (6)	Brian (5)	Nathan (7)	Nathan (13)	^{4th}
Kevin (5)	Corey (10)	Alison (10)	Mike (10)	Corey (17)	^{3rd}
Alison (4)	Yuko (5)	Colin (4)	Yuko (5)	Alison (14)	^{6th}
Colin (6)	Dana (4)	Daryl (6)	Dana (4)	Brian (12)	^{1st}
Daryl (7)	-	Corey (7)	-	Mike (20)	^{5th}

=== Redmond 2013 ===
Competition for the 10th edition of the championship was held in the Seattle suburb of Redmond. Reigning champion Brian Martin and his wife Alison selected a nearby soccer field to hold round 1, played in the Traditional format.

Play resumed for the Xtreme Croquet round at Microsoft headquarters, on the Redwest campus.

The championship Final was played at the Martin homestead.

2013 Tournament Table
Round 1 (Traditional)		Round 2 (Xtreme)		Championship (Olson)	
Match A	Match B	Match C	Match D	Match E	
White Dana (4)	Dana Chang (2)	Colin (4)	Kevin (3)	Brian (12)	1st
Kevin (10)	Colin (3)	Brian (7)	Dana Chang (2)	Daryl (14)	2nd
Robin (5)	Adam (10)	Corey (10)	Daryl (10)	Adam (13)	^{DNF}
Andrew (3)	Brian (5)	Adam (3)	Katherine (7)	Kevin (13)	^{DNF}
Katherine (2)	Daryl (4)	White Dana (2)	Robin (4)	Mike (12)	^{DNF}
Corey (7)	Mike (7)	Mike (5)	Mike (5)	Corey (17)	^{DNF}

=== Ladner 2014 ===
Back where it all began, CroqSoc returned to its roots for the 2014 championship.

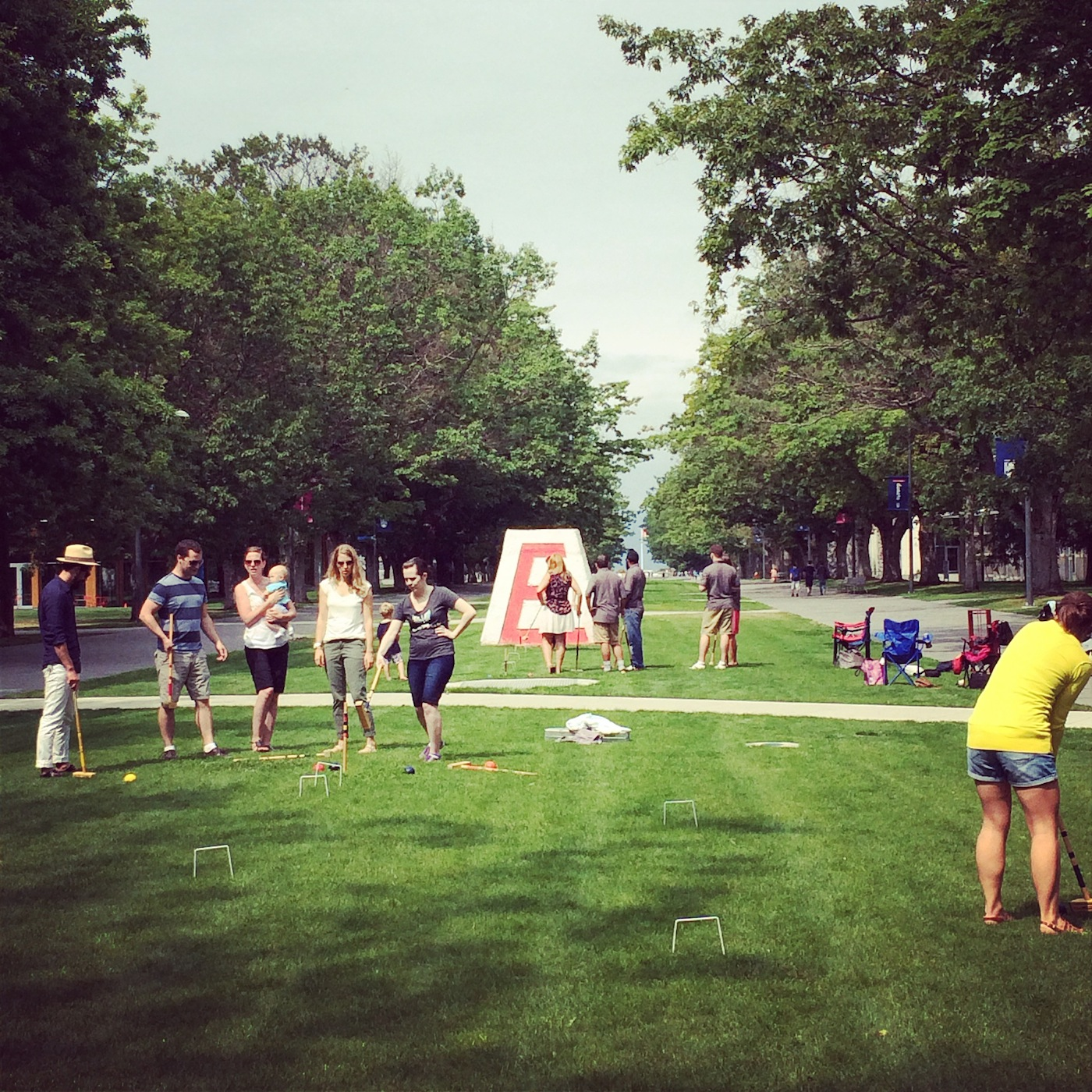
University of British Columbia, Main Mall

On the same pitch of grass along Main Mall at the University of British Columbia, where the 2003 Autumn Classic was hosted, the first round of the 2014 Wile Cup was contested in the same format as ’03 Classic; Traditional 9-wicket croquet.

The second round would be competed in Rhododendron Wood, a forested area on the UBC campus, near Wile Cup namesake Daryl Wile's residence.

In nearby Ladner, the championship match took place at the home of the parents of 2012 Finalist Alison Martin (née Bones).

2014 Tournament Table
Round 1 (Traditional)			Round 2 (Xtreme)			Championship (Oxford)
Match A	Match B	Match C	Match D	Match E	Match F	Match G
Daryl (10)	Steph (10)	Kevin (10)	Daryl (10)	Brian (10)	Kevin (10)	Daryl (20)
Param (7)	Dylan^{x} (7)	Yuuko (7)	Steph (7)	Colin (7)	Katherine (7)	Kevin (20)
Katherine (5)	Brian (5)	Corey (5)	Robin (5)	Yuuko (5)	Param (5)	Steph (17)
Colin (4)	Dana (4)	Mike (4)	Mike (4)	Michelle (4)	Alison (4)	Brian (15) ^{1st}
Robin (3)	Alison (3)	Michelle (3)	Corey (3)	Dana (3)	-	Param (12) ^{2nd}
Leigh (2)	Erin^{x} (2)	-	Leigh (2)	-	-	Mike (8)

=== West Kelowna 2015 ===
The first and second rounds were competed at City Park.

The championship match was 6-wicket Oxford style, modified to squeeze into the backyard pitch of host Colin and Katherine Olson's West Kelowna home.

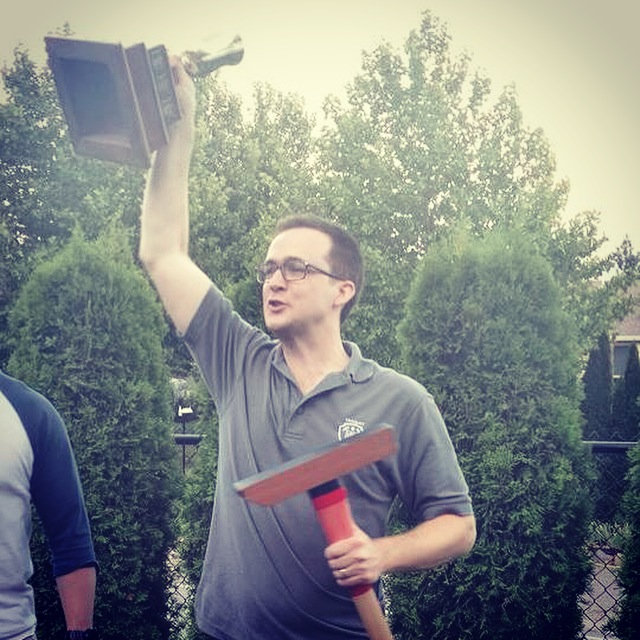
Daryl celebrates

One matter of Croqsoc business was voted on during this year's Wile Cup; it was decided that the championship would be played in perpetuity on the weekend prior to Labour Day, thereby making it easier to schedule for years to come.

2015 Tournament Table
	Round 1 (Traditional)			Round 2 (Xtreme)			Championship (Oxford)
Place	Match A	Match B	Match C	Match D	Match E	Match F	Match G
1	Kevin	Jake	Daryl	Kevin	Jake	Daryl	Daryl ^{1st}
2	Dana	Corey	Brian	Robin	Brian	Adam	Robin ^{2nd}
3	Alison	Colin	Robin	Kat	Alison	Dana	Kevin
4	Kat	Michelle	Adam	Julie H	Michelle	Colin	Jake
5	Julie C ^{x}	Julie H	Erin ^{x}	Corey	-	-	Dana
6							Brian ^{k}

^{x}Did not play in the second round. ^{k}Staked out.

=== Kelowna 2016 ===
The 13th edition of the Wile Cup bore a new tradition; the Junior Championship. The inaugural Junior Wile Cup Championship was a one-game playoff match, contested by Lachlan Wile, Audrey Wile, Robert Cruise, and Fraser Wile.

Round 2, otherwise known as the Xtreme Round, utilized a hybrid of dry, desert-like terrain, and longer distance shots on city park grass. The resulting transition allowed for a second match to begin once the first match was past a certain point.

2016 Tournament Table
	Round 1 (Traditional)			Round 2 (Xtreme)			Championship (Oxford)
Place	Match A	Match B	Match C	Match D	Match E	Match F	Match G
1	Adam	Brian	Mike	Daryl	Mike	Brian	Corey ^{1st}
2	Param	Jake	Julie H	Corey	Jake	Param	Julie H ^{2nd}
3	Corey	Daryl	Kevin	Robin	Julie H	Kerry	Mike^{x}
4	Kerry	Robin	Kat	Kevin	Adam	Michelle	Jake^{k}
5	Michelle	Alison	Dana	Alison	Dana	-	Daryl^{k}
6	Himo	Erin	Colin	Himo	-	-	Brian^{k}

^{x}Self stake-out ^{k}Staked out.

=== Kelowna 2017 ===
The Wile Cup competitors again descended on Kelowna for the annual croquet challenge, exclusively competed at Mission Creek (British Columbia) Regional Park. With ample space to host and spectate, a mix of grey UBC Croquet Society shirts and summer wear stepped onto the pitch for Round 1. The main event, however, proved to be situated nearby; a forested walking path bordered by Mission Creek that would be the battleground in the second round.

2017 Tournament Table
	Round 1 (Traditional)		Round 2 (Xtreme)		Championship (Oxford)
Place	Match A	Match B	Match C	Match D	Match E
1	Daryl	Mike	Brian	Corey	Brian ^{1st}
2	Brian	Corey	Colin	Mike	Mike ^{2nd}
3	Dana	Kevin	Kevin	Alison	Corey
4	Julie H	Alison	Jake	Daryl	Daryl
5	Colin	Erin	Lachlan(Julie)	Julie H	Colin
6	Jake	Julie	Dana	Erin	Julie H

=== Redmond 2018 ===
2018 Tournament Table
	Round 1 (Traditional)		Round 2 (Xtreme)		Championship (Oxford)
Place	Match A	Match B	Match C	Match D	Match E
1	Alison	Dana	Brian	Kevin	Mike ^{1st}
2	Brian	Katherine	Alison	Mike	Kevin ^{2nd}
3	Mike	Julie N	Robin	Jenny	Dana
4	Kevin	Colin	Dana	Adam	Jenny
5	Adam	Jenny	Julie N	Michelle	Alison
6	Robin	Michelle	Katherine	Colin	Brian ^{k}

^{k}Staked out.

=== Surrey 2019 ===
The Wile Cup returned to Surrey for the first time in 7 years, hosted by the Bortolins, thanks to Mike finally getting the loser-monkey off his back in 2018! The competitors congregated at Fleetwood Park for Round 1 action, before travelling to the senior Bortolin residence for the Xtreme and Championship Rounds.

2019 Tournament Table
	Round 1 (Traditional)		Round 2 (Xtreme)		Championship (Oxford)
Place	Match A	Match B	Match C	Match D	Match E
1	Dana	Corey	Robin	Kevin	Ben ^{1st}
2	Ben	Mike	Brian	Steph	Brian ^{2nd}
3	Steph	Brian	Ben	Alison	Kevin
4	Julie	Mark	Corey	Mark	Steph
5	Alison	Michelle	Julie	Mike	Corey
6	Robin	Kevin	Michelle	Dana	Robin

=== 2020 Postponement ===
The 2020 Wile Cup Championship was scheduled to be played in the Kelowna area at the end of August. In July, the tournament was officially postponed due to the COVID-19 pandemic.

Despite the pandemic, a socially-distant "Regional" BBQ and Croquet was held at Gellatly Nut Farm Park in West Kelowna with the Okanagan residents. A course was plotted for the children's game, won by Audrey Wile. The adults adapted the course to "light-Xtreme," and added a few extra wickets.

== Wile Cup Champions ==
=== UBC Era ===
Season	Champion	Points	Runner-up	Points	Tournament wins
2003-04	Adam Gelinas	30	Chris Van Kleeck	29	Masters of the University
2004-05	Jake Cruise	29	Erica Drake	23	none
2005-06	Brandon Taylor	30	Dylan Gunn	29	none
2006-07	Mike Wilton	34	Keegan Bursaw	31	November Reign IV, Xtreme Challenge
2007-08	Chris Amy	26	Martin Bradshaw	24	November Reign V
2008-09	Keegan Bursaw	34	Mike Wilton	31	November Reign VI

=== Modern Era ===
Year	Champion	Runner-up	Location	Date
2010	Corey Fischer	Brian Martin	Monck Provincial Park, BC	August 7
2011	Corey Fischer ^{(2)}	Candace Dickenson	Kamloops, BC	July 2
2012	Brian Martin	Daryl Wile	Surrey, BC	September 2
2013	Brian Martin ^{(2)}	Daryl Wile	Redmond, WA, USA	August 24
2014	Brian Martin ^{(3)}	Param Chauhan	UBC / Ladner, BC	August 16
2015	Daryl Wile	Robin Norman	West Kelowna, BC	August 29
2016	Corey Fischer ^{(3)}	Julie Holt	Kelowna, BC	August 27
2017	Brian Martin ^{(4)}	Mike Bortolin	Kelowna, BC	August 26
2018	Mike Bortolin	Kevin Nickel	Redmond, WA	August 25
2019	Ben Park	Brian Martin	Surrey, BC	August 24
2020	Cancelled (COVID-19)			
2021			Kelowna, BC	TBD
