= Eulama =

Eulama Literary Agency
- Company type: Private
- Industry: Talent and Literary Agencies
- Founded: Buenos Aires, Argentina (1962)
- Headquarters: Rome, Italy (Italy)
- Key people: Pina von Prellwitz, President; Leonardo von Prellwitz, Head of Film
- Website: Official website

Eulama Literary Agency (Eulama) is an Italian literary agency which represents a vast array of authors, script writers, as well as a variety of companies and their products.

== History ==
Eulama is the second oldest literary agency in Italy. It was founded in 1962 in Buenos Aires, Argentina, by Harald Kahnemann-Oppenheimer and Karin von Prellwitz, who had emigrated to Argentina from their homes in Germany two decades earlier. The name Eulama is short for European Latin American Agency. The Agency is now Europe based, but it still keeps a close working relationship with the most authoritative Latin American publishers. Since 1964 the head office of the Agency has moved from Montevideo to Rome, from where Eulama operates worldwide, negotiating and licensing literary rights, serializations, permissions, audio, film and co-production rights on behalf of clients all over the world. Furthermore, Eulama also operates in areas such as monitoring production-related activities of licensees, collecting due payments and researching financial solvency and business history of potential licensees.

== Notable authors mediated by Eulama ==
- Gabriele Amorth
- Karl Barth
- Leonardo Benevolo
- Norberto Bobbio
- Remo Bodei
- Dietrich Bonhoeffer
- Jane Bowles
- Jerome Bruner
- Peter Burke
- Judith Butler
- Elias Canetti
- Luciano Canfora
- Mário Cláudio
- Carlo Cipolla
- Robert Dahl
- Salvador Dalí
- Umberto Eco
- Hans Magnus Enzensberger
- Federico Fellini
- Paul Feyerabend
- Vilém Flusser
- Dario Fo
- László Földényi
- Bronislaw Geremek
- René Girard
- Nelson Goodman
- Jack Goody
- André Green
- Anselm Grün
- Romano Guardini
- Gustavo Gutiérrez
- Anna Kavan
- Jacques Le Goff
- Aaron J. Gurevitch
- Wolfgang Lepenies
- Rita Levi Montalcini
- Richard Lewontin
- Karl Löwith
- Humberto Maturana
- Johann Baptist Metz
- Jürgen Moltmann
- Massimo Montanari
- Alberto Moravia
- Bruno Munari
- Nuccio Ordine
- Wolfhart Pannenberg
- Ilya Prigogine
- Joseph Ratzinger
- Julien Ries
- Roberto Rossellini
- Paolo Rossi
- Fernando Savater
- Edward Schillebeeckx
- Burrhus H. Skinner
- Karlheinz Stockhausen
- Alain Touraine
- Francisco Varela
- Gianni Vattimo
- Jean-Pierre Vernant
- Michel Vovelle
- Ludwig Wittgenstein
