= Elizabeth Scott (textile manufacturer) =

Scottish textile manufacturer (-1795)

- Born: Elizabeth Chalmers
- Died: 6 April 1795; Inveresk
- Occupation: Textile manufacturer
- Spouse: Archibald Scott

Elizabeth Scott (née Chalmers; died 6 April 1795) was a British textile manufacturer based in Scotland.

== Life ==
Scott's birth date is unknown, but her father was William Chalmers who was the provost of Aberdeen in 1738 and 1746. She married an Edinburgh surgeon named Archibald Scott in 1744. Her husband, Archibald Scott, is thought to be in his forties when he married.

She became involved in Musselburgh's weaving industry. She would employ 1,200 people to make un-decorated cloth which she then used to supply textile printers in Scotland and England. Her workers were weaving linen and cotton. In 1761 she successfully applied for a grant to support her linen business from the board of trustees for fisheries, manufactures and improvements. She later supplied for a grant from the Edinburgh Society for Encouraging Arts, Sciences, Manufactures, and Agriculture to make "brown cottons". She bought looms that had linen warps so that a cotton weft thread could be woven in and the board supplied other assistance. By the following year, she was manufacturing 11,000 yards of textile.

In 1766 she became the only woman who was trusted to stamp her own textiles as being of good quality. This was required for all cloth containing linen, and it had to be approved by an official under a law of 1727. Scott was the only woman to have her own stamp. She improved her business by visiting London to establish buyers for her work and she applied for more grants to train people in how to use the new spinning jenny. Previously her spinning had been done in workhouses in Musselburgh. Scott exhibited her work and won awards at the Linen Hall in Edinburgh.

Her business was overtaken by water powered competitors in the 1780s, but by that time, she had made the family's fortune. Her husband died in 1784.

== Libel ==
Scott was libelled in a poem that alleged that Mansfeldt Cardonnel was the father of her children.

Captain Messenburgh laid seige to the Castle
Commissioner Cardonnel poured in Hard Shot
Doctor Carlyle said Why Not
And the Lord have mercy upon poor Dr Scott.

Her husband was unmoved by the allegations against her reputation. Scott died in Inveresk near Edinburgh in 1795.
