= John Barkley Means =

American academic (1939–2025)

John Barkley Means (January 2, 1939 – February 11, 2025) was an American professor of Liberal Arts at Temple University from 1968 to 2003. He joined the foreign language faculty at that university on completion of doctoral studies at the University of Illinois at Urbana-Champaign. Means was a founding director of the Center for Critical Languages and, in later years, served as director of Temple University's Institute for Languages and International Studies. Initially focusing on the development of Luso-Brazilian programs at Illinois and Temple, in the 1970s Means's professional interests broadened to include the development of non-traditional academic methodologies for the teaching of low-enrollment languages at the college/university level and, subsequently, at the secondary level as well. Scholarly publications during his first decade at Temple University focused on Ibero-American culture, including Essays on Brazilian Literature (Simon & Schuster Inc, 1971). In the 1980s and '90s, Means's academic interests also incorporated United States Department of Education grant-funded adult language-acquisition research.

Means established Temple University's Critical Languages Center in 1975 (now Asian & Middle Eastern Languages) and, in 1977, assumed directorship of the National Association of Self-Instructional Language Programs (NASILP), a newly developing consortium of schools providing courses in various less commonly taught languages through an auto-didactic approach to individualized instruction. Under Means's leadership, the association expanded during the 1980s from a largely regional into a fully national association of over 125 institutions with self-accessed academic programs in more than forty foreign languages—i.e., most modern languages offered in North American secondary and higher educational institutions except Spanish, French, and German. During this period, the association received external funding from the U.S. Department of Education and private foundations (e.g., Japan Foundation) for support of academic initiatives administered by Means at Temple University. In 1998, after more than twenty years under Means's directorship, the NASILP secretariat was transferred to the University of Arizona.

During the 1980s and 1990s, Means remained an active figure nationally in foreign-language higher education, notably through his seminal work at NASILP and other professional organizations serving the field of foreign language teaching, especially the non-Western language areas. Means was a founding officer of the National Council of Organizations of Less Commonly Taught Languages (NCOLCTL), initially underwritten by a series of grants from the Ford Foundation, and served as the Council's Executive Secretary-Treasurer for twelve years (1989-2001). Other activities included service to the Joint National Committee for Languages (JNCL), representing all national, regional and state foreign language organizations, and the National Council of Languages and International Studies, engaged in government lobbying efforts in support of language acquisition in American secondary and higher education. Also during this period, Means served as a language/linguistics curriculum evaluator for the American Council on Education, and was consulting editor for foreign language textual materials with Norton Publishers, New York, NY.

From 2003, Means was Professor Emeritus of Temple University and Executive Director Emeritus of the National Association of Self-Instructional Language Programs (NASILP). He was also a member of the University of Illinois President's Council, and was a Diamond Legion member of Pi Kappa Phi.

Means died on February 11, 2025, at the age of 86.
