= Nuccio Ordine =

Italian scholar (1958–2023)

- Born: 18 July 1958; Diamante, Calabria, Italy
- Died: 10 June 2023 (aged 64); Cosenza, Italy
- Occupations: Writer, professor, literary critic
- Writing career
- Genre: Literature

Nuccio Ordine (Italian pronunciation: [ˈnuttʃo ˈordine]; 18 July 1958 – 10 June 2023) was an Italian literary critic who was professor of Italian literature at the University of Calabria. He was one of the world's top experts on the Renaissance and the philosopher Giordano Bruno.

== Life and career ==
Ordine was a fellow of the Harvard University Center for Studies of the Italian Renaissance and of the Alexander von Humboldt Stiftung. He taught at the American universities of Yale and New York, and at the European universities EHESS, Ecole Normale Supérieure Paris, Paris-IV Sorbonne, Paris-III Sorbonne-Nouvelle, CESR of Tours, Institut Universitaire de France, Paris-VIII Vincennes, Institut des Études Avancées de Paris, Warburg Institute and Eichstätt University.

His books have been translated into many languages, including Arabic, Chinese, Japanese, Russian, and Basque.

In France he was a general editor of two series at Les Belles Lettres Publishing House: the complete works of Giordano Bruno and the “Bibliotheque Italienne”.

In Italy, he was the general editor of the “Sileni” series at Liguori Publishing House, the “Classics of European thinking” series at Nino Aragno Publishing House, and the “Classics of European literature” series at Bompiani Publishing House. Nuccio Ordine also wrote for the "Corriere della Sera" newspaper.

Ordine died from a stroke on 10 June 2023, at the age of 64.

== Honours ==
- Knight of the French Legion of Honour, Ecole Normale Superieure, Paris, December 2012
- Commander of the Ordine al Merito della Republica Italiana, 2010
- Chevalier dans l’Ordre des Palmes académiques, 2009
- Honorary Member of the Institute of Philosophy of the Russian Academy of Sciences, 2010
- Laurea Honoris Causa of the Federal University of Rio Grande de Sul, 2011
- Doctor Honoris Causa of the Catholic University of Louvain, 2020
- Princess of Asturias Awards for Communication and Humanities, 2023

== Books ==
=== Non Fiction ===
- The Threshold of Shadow (Orig. "La soglia dell'ombra") (2003), Published by Marsilio; (2004) Revised 2nd Edition; (2009) 3rd Edition; translations: French (Les Belles Lettres, 2003), Spanish (Siruela, 2008), Portuguese (Perspectiva, 2006), Romanian (Institutul Cultural Roman, 2005), Russian(Saint Petersburg University Press, 2008), Deutsch (Königshaus & Neumann 2009)
- Giordano Bruno and the Philosophy of the Ass (Orig.La cabala dell'asino) (1987), Published by Liguori, Italy; (2005) Revised 2nd Edition; translations: French (Les Belles Lettres, 1993, 2005); English (Yale University Press, 1996); German (Wilhelm Fink, 1999); Chinese (Oriental Press, 2005); Romanian (Humanitas, 2004); Japanese (Toshindo, 2002); Portuguese (Educs, 2008)
- Giordano Bruno, Ronsard and Religion (2007), Published by Cortina, Italy; (2009) Revised 2nd Edition; translations: French (Albin Michel, 2004)
- Theory of Short Stories and Theory of Laughter in the 16th Century (Orig.Teoria della novella e teoria del riso nel '500 (1996), Published by Liguori, Italy; (2009) Revised 2nd Edition; translations: French (Vrin/Nino Aragno, 2002)
- The Meeting of Knowledges (Orig. Le rendez-vous des savoirs) (1999), Published by Kliencksieck, France; (2009) Les Belles Lettres, Paris.
- Three crowns for a king. The device of Henry III and its mysteries (Orig. Trois couronnes pour un roi. La devise d'Henri III et ses mystères (Paris, Les Belles Lettres, 2011)

== Awards ==
- Rombiolo; 2007
- Filosofia Siracusa; 2007
- Anassilaos; 2006 for the Megale Hellas section
- Orient Express; 2003
- Cesare de Lollis; 2003
- Le Città della Magna Grecia; 1987
- Princess of Asturias Award for Communication and Humanities, 2023

== See also ==
- Giordano Bruno
- Renaissance
- Eulama
