= Margaret Meen =

British painter

- Born: November or December 1751; Bungay, Suffolk
- Died: January 1834 (aged 82); Bath, Somerset

Margaret Meen (1751-1834) was an English watercolour painter. Known for botanical illustrations (often painted on vellum), Margaret Meen taught this art to Queen Charlotte and her daughters; as well as to the four daughters (and several grand daughters) of Joshua Smith (English politician), MP.

== Life ==
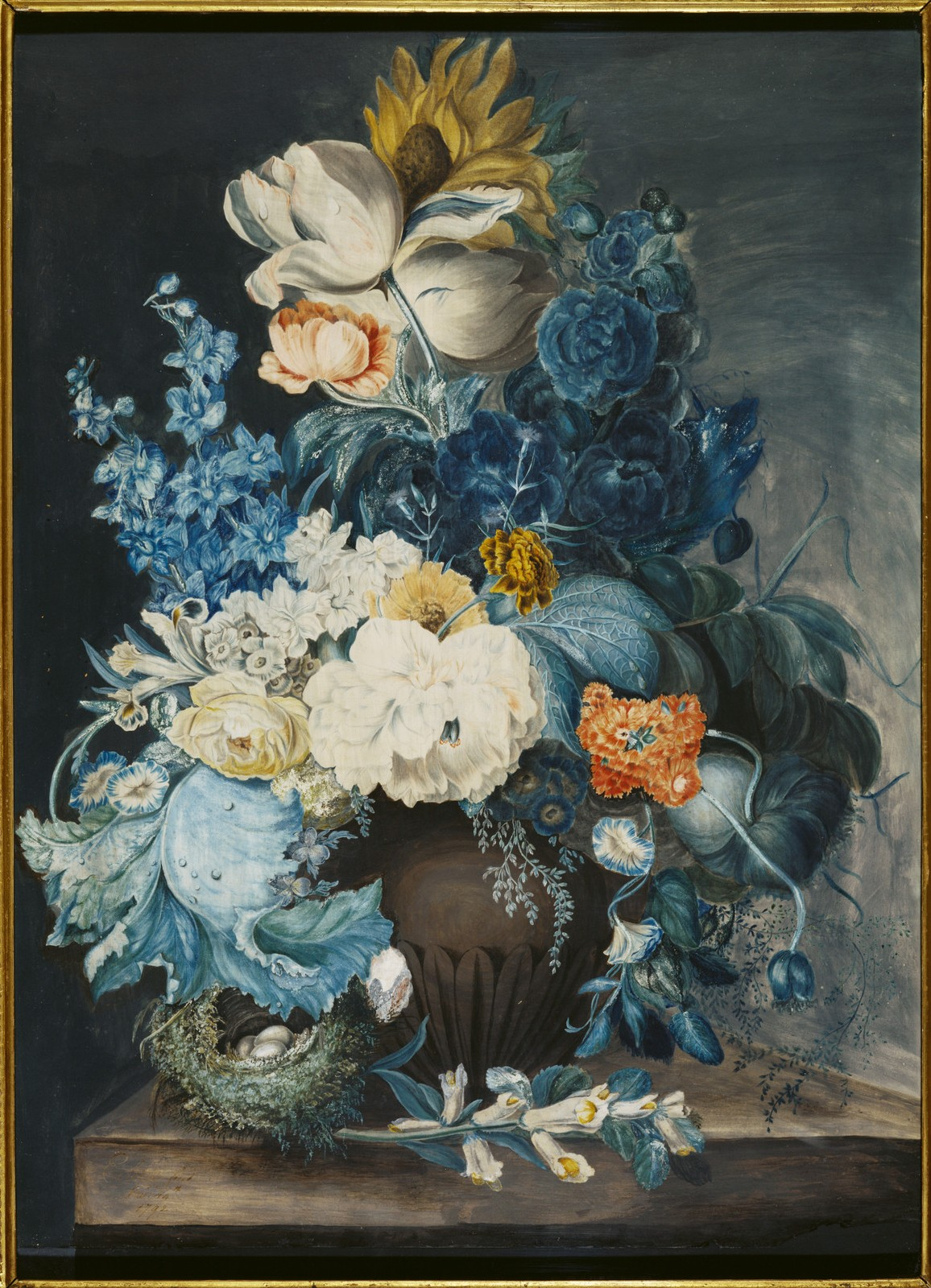
A group of flowers in a jar and a bird's nest, copy of the painting by Margaret Meen, copied by Princess Elizabeth

The daughter of Henry and Sarah Meen, Margaret was born in Bungay, Suffolk or more likely in Harleston, Norfolk, where she was baptised in December 1751. She moved to London to teach drawing flowers and insects in 1770.

She had good connections as her elder brother, Henry Meen, was a noted cleric. She earned money as a teacher of drawing. Her students included the four daughters of the member of parliament for Devizes, Joshua Smith, in the 1780s. She showed her work as a botanist at the Royal Academy and the Royal Watercolour Society, and published Exotic plants from the Royal Gardens at Kew in 1790, which she dedicated to Queen Charlotte. A large collection of work is now part of the Kew Herbarium, with further botanicals by Margaret Meen in the collections of The Vyne (National Trust) and the Royal Horticultural Society (London).

Her painting A group of flowers in a jar and a bird's nest, which she painted in 1806 for Princess Elizabeth, was included in the 1905 book Women Painters of the World.

Margaret Meen continued teaching, at schools and in homes of private pupils, throughout the 1820s. She died in Bath, her burial registered in the parish of Walcot, Somerset on 9 January 1834. Her probated will (28 January 1834) appears listed as "Will of Margaret Meen, Spinster of Loughton, Essex" online at The National Archives.
