= Meena Kumari (weightlifter) =

Indian weightlifter

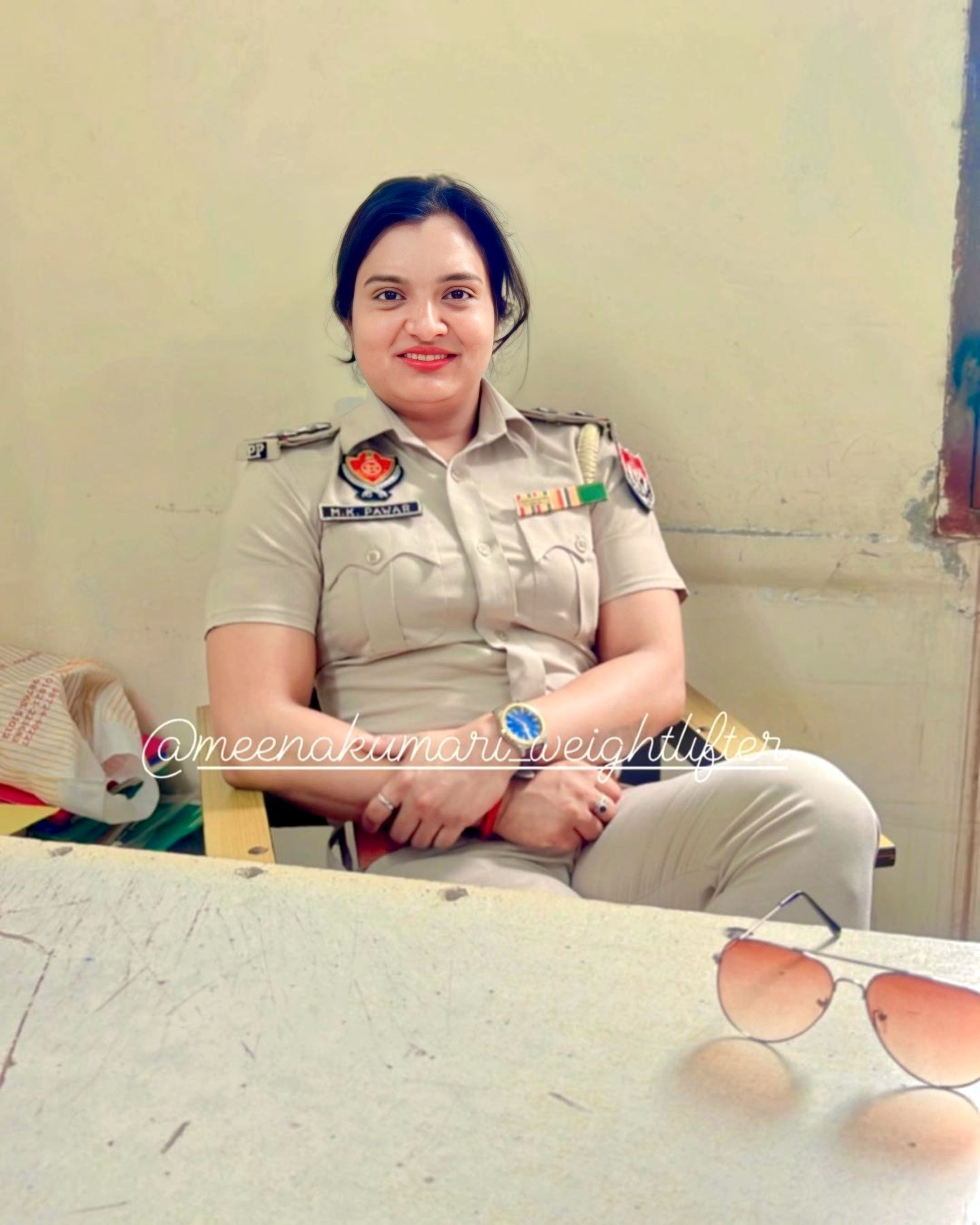
- Meena Kumari showing face

Personal information
- Nationality: Indian
- Born: 15 August 1994 (age 31) Punjab, India
- Height: 1.60 m (5 ft 3 in) (2014)
- Weight: 58 kg (128 lb) (2014)

Sport
- Country: India
- Sport: Weightlifting
- Event: 58 kg

Achievements and titles
- Highest world ranking: Snatch 90kg Clean&jerk 125kg

Meena Kumari (born 15 August 1994) is an Indian weightlifter and Inspector in Punjabi Police, who placed fifth in the women's 58 kg weight class at the 2014 Commonwealth Games in Glasgow.

== Career ==
=== Police service ===
Kumari joined the Punjab police as a constable after attending college. By 2016, she was appointed to the post of Inspector in Punjabi Police.

=== Sports career ===
Kumari was previously a mountaineer and skydiver. She was selected for the 2007-8 National Cadet Corps expedition to Everest, though she did not participate.

Kumari took up weightlifting in 2008 when she attended college at the encouragement of her uncle, who himself participated. After joining the police she was coached by police weightlifter Saranjeet Kundan and sponsored by legislator Pawan Kumar Tinu. She won the gold medal in women's weightlifting in the 63 kg category at the All-India Police Games in December 2013, her third consecutive gold medal at these games. She lifted 110 kg in clean and jerk, two kilos better than her gold in the 58 kg category the previous year.

At the Commonwealth Games in Glasgow in July 2014, Kumari came fifth in the 58 kg category, lifting a total of 194 kg, 83 kg in snatch and 111 kg in clean and jerk.

In May 2016 at the Punjab and Haryana High Court, Kumari successfully appealed a three-year ban imposed on her by the Indian Weightlifting Federation in November 2014 for unspecified alleged behaviour in training and at the Commonwealth Games. The high court set aside the ban.

In 2017, Kumari took part in the Senior National Powerlifting Championship in Kerala and won a silver medal in the deadlift and bronze in the squat, placing third in the 63 kg category.

== Personal life ==
Kumari is from Jattewali village in Adampur, Punjab, where her father is a tailor. She has three older brothers.
