= While (disambiguation) =

While is an English word indicating duration or simultaneity.

While may also refer to:

- Chris While (born 1956), British singer-songwriter
- Kellie While (born 1976), British singer-songwriter
- While loop in computer programming

== See also ==
- Wile (disambiguation)
