= Means =

Means may refer to:

- Means LLC, an anti-capitalist media worker cooperative
- Means (band), a Christian hardcore band from Regina, Saskatchewan
- Means, Kentucky, a town in the US
- Means (surname)
- Means Johnston Jr. (1916–1989), US Navy admiral
- Means, in ethics, something of instrumental value that helps to achieve an end
  - Means, an indicator of suspicion in a criminal investigation

== See also ==
- Ways and means committee, a government body charged with reviewing and making recommendations for government budgets
- Mean (disambiguation)
