= Edith Mitchill Prellwitz =

American artist

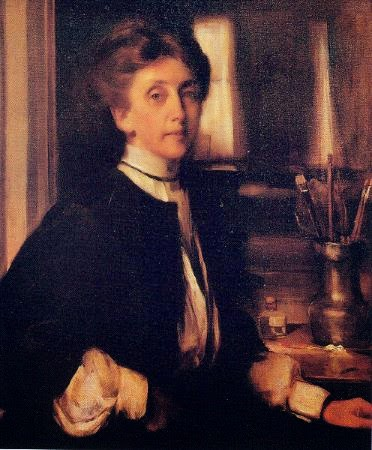
- Edith Mitchill Prellwitz, self-portrait, 1909
- Born: Edith Mitchill; 1865; South Orange, New Jersey
- Died: 1944 (aged 78–79)

Edith Mitchill Prellwitz (1865–1944) was an American artist who is known for Impressionist and Tonalist studies of Peconic Bay, New York, as well as for figurative paintings with literary or mythical subjects.

== Family and education ==
Prellwitz was born Edith Mitchill in South Orange, New Jersey, and was the daughter of a well-to-do businessman. Starting in 1883, she studied art at the Art Students League, where George de Forest Brush and William Merritt Chase were among her teachers. In 1887, she enrolled in the first life drawing class open to women, a rare privilege at a time when female art students were ordinarily excluded from drawing nude models.

In 1889, she was one of the founding members of the Woman's Art Club of New York. That same year, she went to Paris to study at the Académie Julian for a year and a half; among her teachers were William-Adolphe Bouguereau and Gustave Courtois. She exhibited at the Paris Salon.

== Art career ==
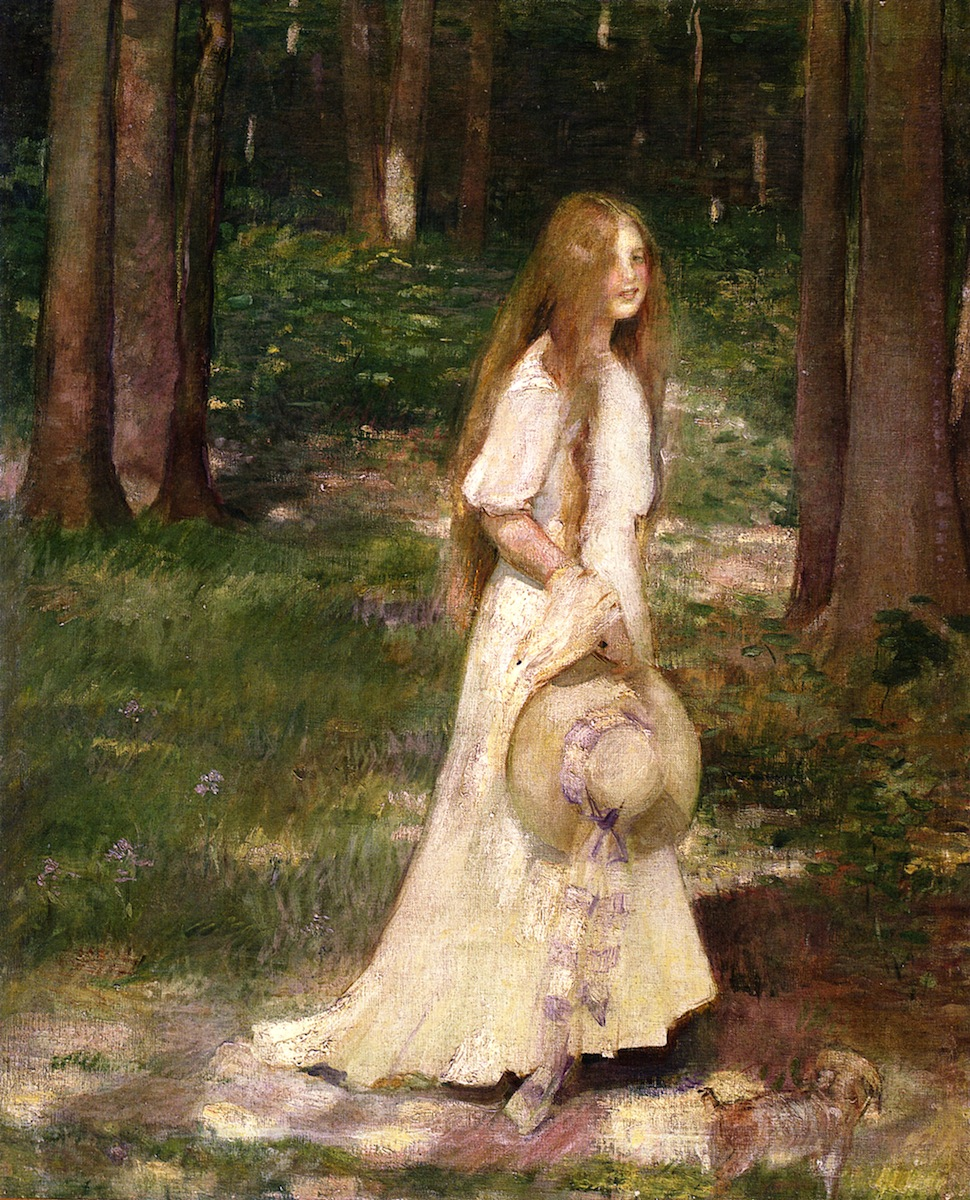
Edith Mitchill Prellwitz, Early Morning Stroll, oil on canvas, 1900

On her return to the United States, she set up her studio in the Holbein Studios building on West 55th Street in Manhattan. In 1894, she married the artist Henry Prellwitz, who had a studio across the hall, after he promised to promote her career as much as his own. They had a son, Edwin.

In 1899, Edith and Henry began spending time on the north shore of Peconic Bay on Long Island, where their artist friends Irving Ramsay Wiles and Edward August Bell were already established. They moved there permanently in 1914. They painted plein air paintings and also worked in adjoining studios at High House, their Peconic Bay home.

Prellwitz painted Peconic Bay landscapes and waterscapes, as well as still lifes, domestic interiors, and figure paintings. Her style ranged from Impressionism and Tonalism to a romantic strain of academic realism. She exhibited mainly in the eastern United States as well as at various expositions such as the 1901 Pan-American Exposition, where she won a medal. Some of her figure paintings featured literary or mythical subjects, and she won prizes for several works in this vein. In 1894 the National Academy of Design (NAD) awarded her the Second Hallgarten Prize for her painting Hagar, and the following year she won the NAD's Norman W. Dodge Prize for her Tannhäuser Legend. In 1929 she won the NAD's Julia A. Shaw Memorial Prize for The Convalescent. Her work has been compared, in quality and subject matter, to that of Mary Cassatt, John Singer Sargent, and her teacher William Merritt Chase.

Both Prellwitzes disappeared into obscurity for several decades after their deaths in the early 1940s. Rediscovered in the 1980s, they have been called one of the best-kept secrets in American art history.

Prellwitz's work is now in the collection of the Metropolitan Museum, the Parrish Art Museum, and other institutions.
