= Henry Prellwitz =

American artist

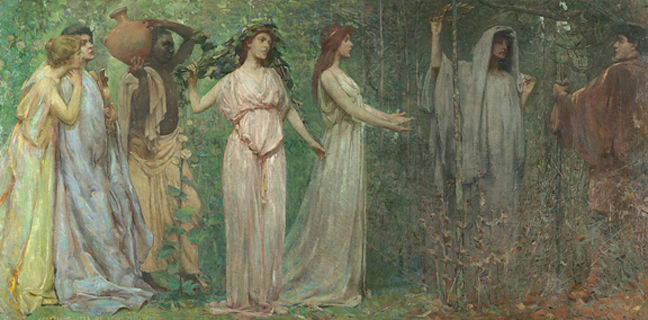
Henry Prellwitz, Lotus and Laurel, oil on canvas, 1904.

Henry Prellwitz (1865–1940) was an American artist known for allegorical paintings and waterscapes of Peconic Bay, New York.

== Family and education ==
Arthur Henry Prellwitz was born in New York, where his Prussian parents had emigrated. Prellwitz studied art at the Art Students League of New York, where his chief mentor was Thomas Wilmer Dewing; he later became its director. He also studied at the Académie Julian in Paris.

In 1892, he set up his studio in the Holbein Studios building on West 55th Street in Manhattan, where his future wife, the artist Edith Mitchill, also had a studio. They married in 1894 and had a son, Edwin.

By the mid-1890s, he was teaching portrait painting at the Pratt Institute, where one of his students was the Cubist artist Max Weber.

== Art career ==
In 1899, Henry and Edith moved to the north shore of Peconic Bay on Long Island, where their artist friends Irving Ramsay Wiles and Edward August Bell were already established. They painted plein air paintings and also worked in adjoining studios at High House, their Peconic Bay home.

Prellwitz painted Impressionist and Tonalist waterscapes of Peconic Bay and allegorical figure paintings such as the 1904 Lotus and Laurel. He exhibited mainly on the east coast and at expositions like the St. Louis World's Fair, where he won a silver medal. He won the Third Hallgarten Prize from the National Academy of Design (NAD) in 1893 for The Prodigal Son, and his Venus won the Thomas B. Clarke Prize at the 1907 NAD exhibition for the best figure composition by an American citizen painted in the United States.

Both Prellwitzes disappeared into obscurity for several decades after their deaths in the early 1940s. Rediscovered in the 1980s, they have been called one of the best-kept secrets in art history.

Prellwitz's work is now in the collection of the Metropolitan Museum, the Parrish Art Museum, and other institutions.
