= Lemuel M. Wiles =

- Born: Perry, New York, U.S.
- Died: January 28, 1905; Manhattan, New York City, U.S.
- Occupation: Painter
- Children: Irving Ramsey Wiles

Lemuel M. Wiles (1826–1905) was an American landscape painter.

== Early life ==
Lemuel Maynard Wiles was born on October 21, 1826, in Perry, Wyoming County, New York. He studied landscape painting with Jasper Francis Cropsey.

== Career ==
Wiles taught school in Perry, Utica and Albany.

Wiles served as the Head of the Art Department at the University of Nashville. He also served as the Director of the College of Fine Arts at Ingham University.

Wiles was an early traveler to California. His journey took him via the Isthmus of Panama all the way to the West Coast. Once in California, he did many landscape paintings of Spanish towns. In his lifetime, his paintings were often exhibited at the National Academy of Design. Moreover, he painted the Cucamonga Valley in 1874.

== Personal life ==
Wiles resided at 101 West 55th Street in Manhattan. He had a son, Irving Ramsey Wiles, who became a portrait painter.

== Death and legacy ==
Wiles died of pneumonia on January 28, 1905, in Manhattan, New York City.

His artwork can be seen in the Perry Public Library's Stowell-Wiles Gallery in his home town of Perry, New York, and in private collections. Additionally, his painting of the Cucamonga Valley is in the collection of the Natural History Museum of Los Angeles County. Furthermore, his bust, designed by sculptor Chester Beach in 1922, is on the grounds of the Le Roy Central School in Le Roy, New York.
