= Elizabeth Scott (poet) =

Scottish poet

Elizabeth Scot(t) (17 July 1729 – 1789), born Elizabeth Rutherford, was an eighteenth-century Scottish poet who composed stanzas from a young age.

== Biography ==
Elizabeth was born 17 July 1729 in Edinburgh, Scotland, the daughter of Alice Watson and advocate David Rutherford. Her aunt Alison Cockburn was also a poet and she was encouraged to write by the Scottish poet Allan Ramsay. Elizabeth married Walter Scot in 1768. Together they lived at Wauchope House near Jedburgh, Scotland.

Scot is most known for the poetic epistle titled ‘The Guidwife of Wauchope-house to Robert Burns', which she wrote for Scottish poet Robert Burns in 1787. Burns visited her on his Scottish tour. Other correspondents who supported her work include Enlightenment author Allan Ramsey and author Thomas Blacklock.
