= Irving Ramsey Wiles =

American painter (1861–1948)

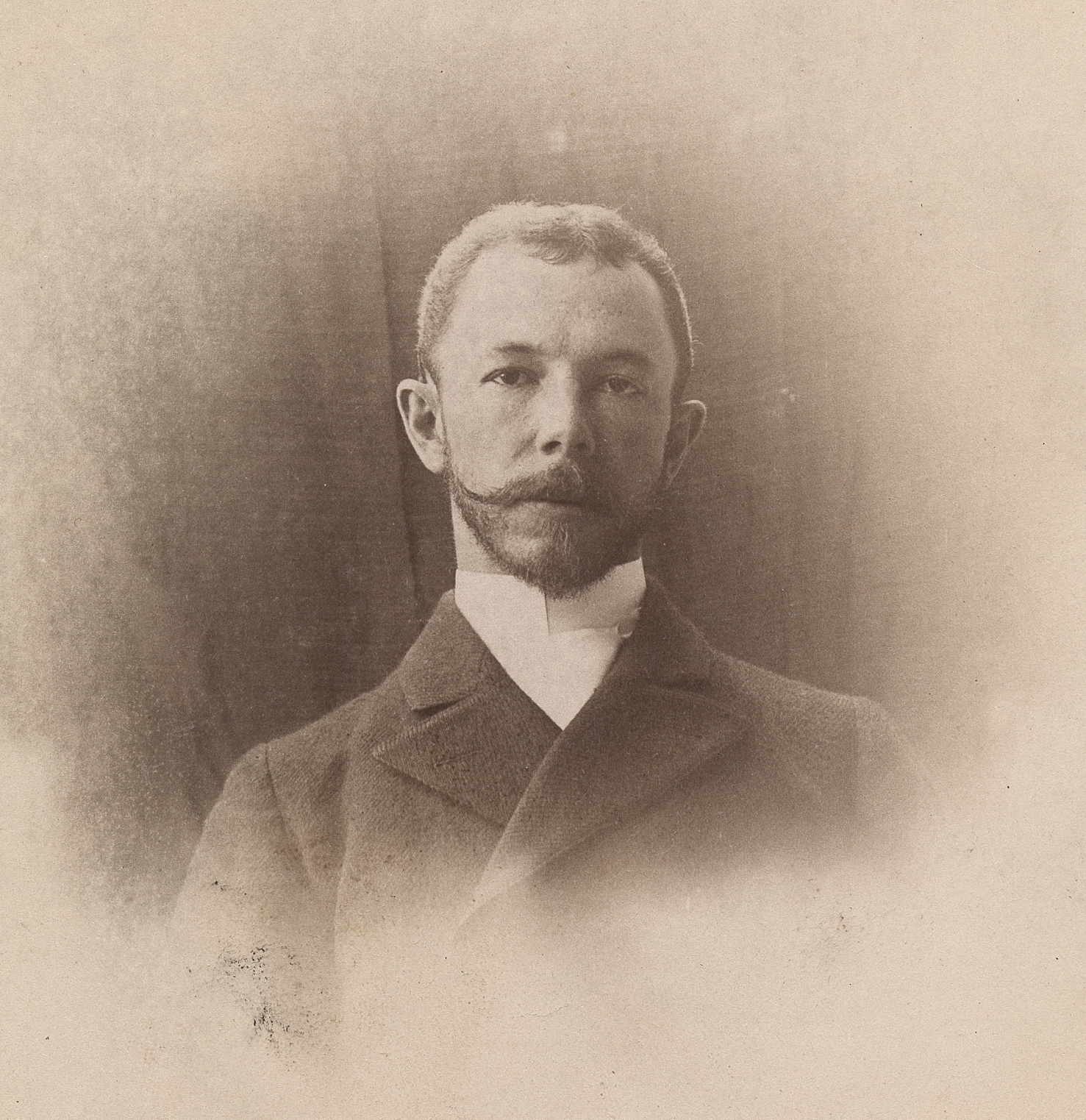
- Wiles in 1890
- Born: April 8, 1861; Utica, New York
- Died: July 29, 1948 (aged 87); Peconic, New York
- Education: Sedgwick Institute; Art Students League of New York
- Awards: Third Hallgarten Prize (1886)

Irving Ramsey Wiles (April 8, 1861 – July 29, 1948) was an American artist, born in Utica, New York.

In the early 20th century, Wiles was a popular exponent of American grand manner portraiture as redefined by the work of John Singer Sargent, Giovanni Boldini, and James Whistler in late 19th century Europe. During his peak, he was one of the leading portraitists in America, working alongside his compatriots John White Alexander and Cecilia Beaux to paint the American leisure class.

Despite the decline of interest in his work (in part due to the general declining status of grand manner portraiture during the 21st century), Wiles' paintings today continue to reside and remain on display in institutions such as the de Young Museum, the Metropolitan Museum of Art, the National Gallery, Washington D.C., and the Smithsonian American Art Museum.

== Life ==
Irving Ramsey Wiles was born in Utica, New York on April 8, 1861. He was educated at the Sedgwick Institute in Great Barrington, and learned the basics of painting from his father, Lemuel M. Wiles (1826–1905), who focused primarily on landscapes. From 1879 to 1881 he studied in the Art Students League of New York under James Carroll Beckwith and William Merritt Chase, and later in Paris under Carolus-Duran.

In his early years, he worked as an illustrator for American magazines, and later he devoted himself with great success to portraiture. He was a member of the Society of American Artists, which prefaced his 1897 election into the National Academy of Design as an associate. Wiles was also a member of the American Water Color Society.

While active as a varied painter in the late 19th century, his career reached new heights in 1902, when his portrait of the actress Julia Marlowe was exhibited at the National Academy. The elegant and successful grand manner portrait bolstered him to fame, and from 1902 until the late 1920s, when he retired due to infirmity, Wiles continually received portrait commissions from America's elite.

Wiles would go on to paint notable Americans such as Theodore Roosevelt and William Jennings Bryan. While prized today for his paintings and portraits of women, Wiles was considered accomplished in the field of male portraiture during his life: in 1919 he was selected by the National Art Committee to paint portraits for a pictorial history of World War I.

Toward the end of his career Wiles was noted for the plein-air land and seascapes he painted at his home in Peconic, New York. Wiles died penniless (without so much as headstone) in Peconic on July 29, 1948.

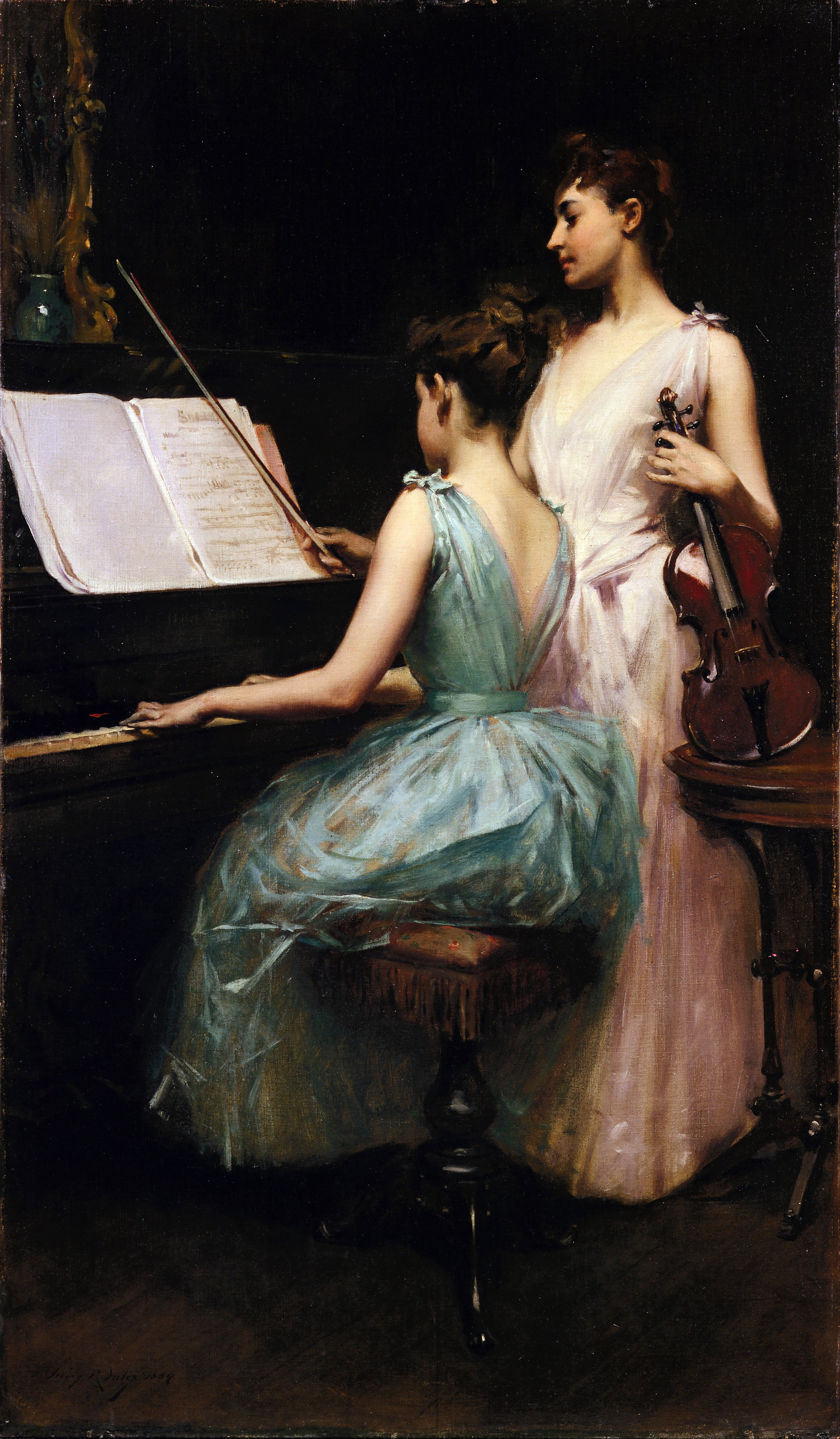
Irving Wiles. The Sonata (1889) Oil on canvas. Fine Arts Museums of San Francisco (de Young Museum)

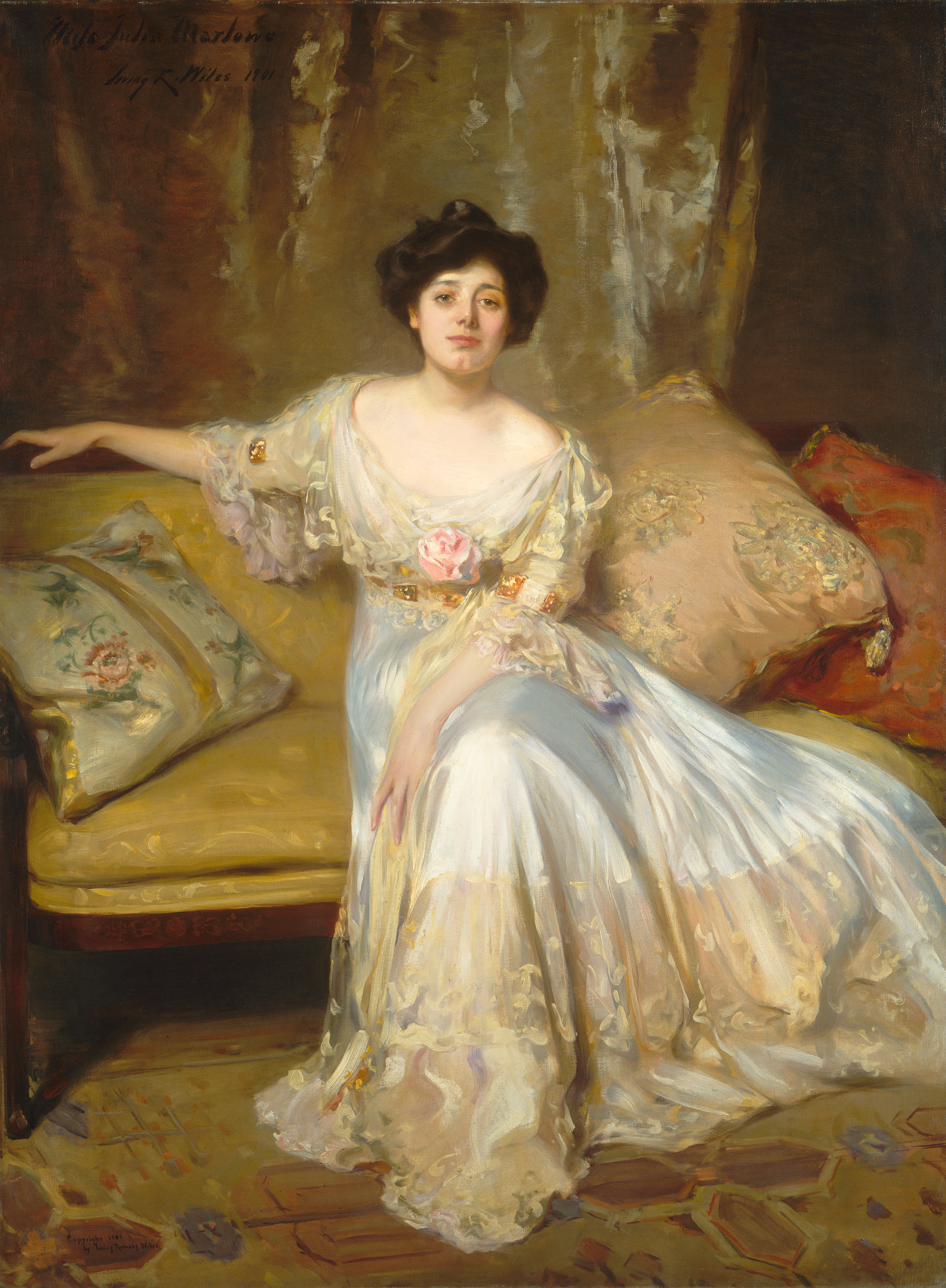
Irving Wiles.
Portrait of Miss Julia Marlowe (1901). Oil on canvas. National Gallery, Washington, D.C.

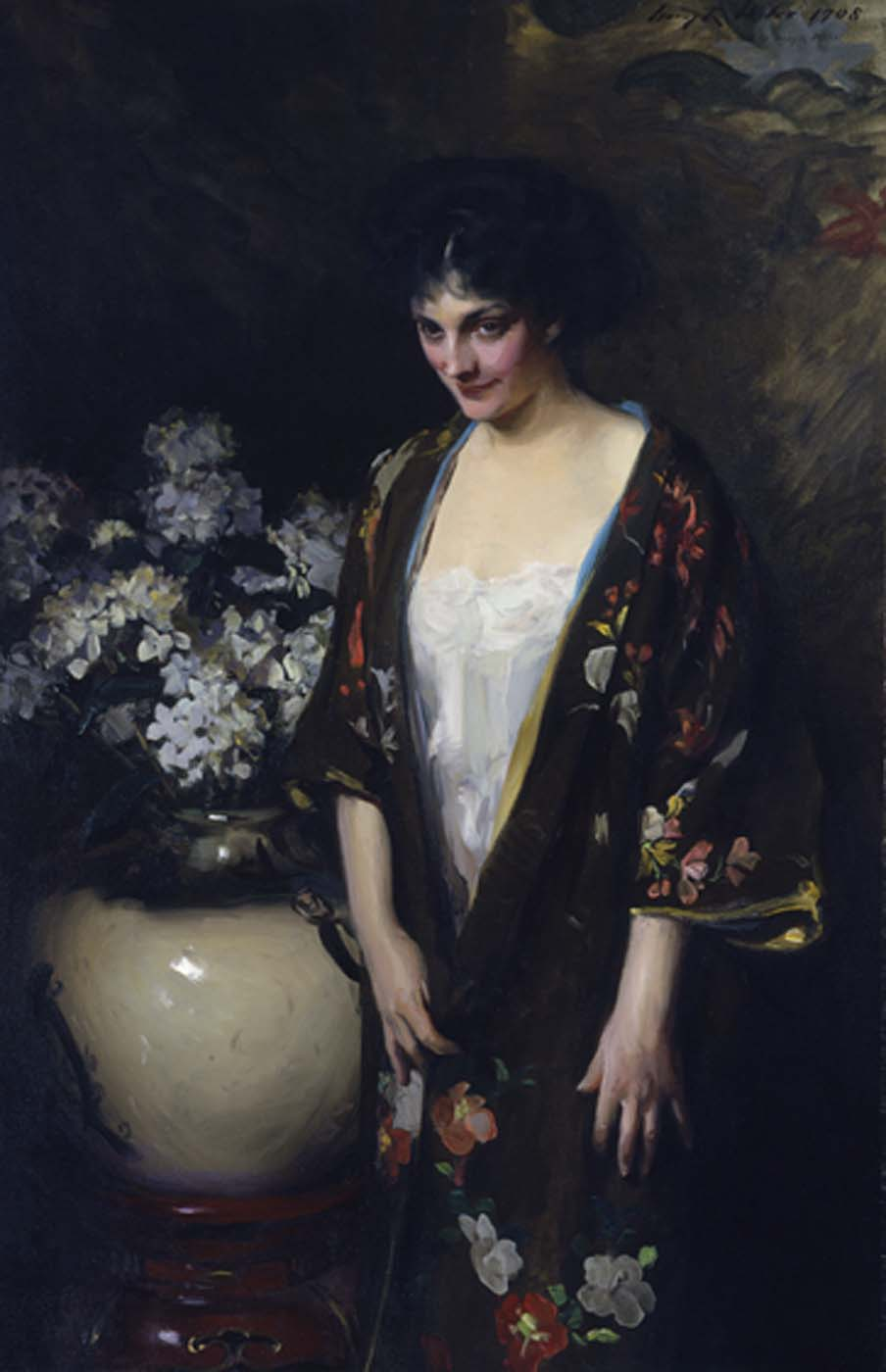
Irving Wiles. Brown Kimono
(Portrait of Kathryn Beta La Forque) (1908). Oil on canvas. Smithsonian American Art Museum
