= Mean (disambiguation) =

Mean is a term used in mathematics and statistics.

Mean may also refer to:

== Music ==
- Mean (album), a 1987 album by Montrose
- "Mean" (song), a 2010 song by Taylor Swift from Speak Now
- "Mean", a 2006 song by Get Set Go from Ordinary World
- "Mean", a 2008 song by John Mellencamp from Life, Death, Love and Freedom
- "Mean", a 2008 song by Pink from Funhouse
- "Mean", a 2012 song by Bloc Party from the deluxe edition of Four
- "Mean", a 2012 song by the Babies from Our House on the Hill
- "Mean", a 2012 song by French Montana from Mac & Cheese 3
- "Mean", a 2015 song by Nicole Dollanganger from Natural Born Losers
- "Mean", a 2025 song by Good Charlotte from Motel Du Cap
- Meane, or mean, a vocal music term from 15th and 16th century England

== Other uses ==
- Content (measure theory), finitely-additive measures, sometimes called "means"
- Ethic mean, a sociology term
- Mean (magazine), an American bi-monthly magazine
- Meanness, a personal quality
- MEAN (solution stack), a free and open-source JavaScript software stack for building dynamic web sites and web applications
- A synonym of frugal

== See also ==
- Meaning (disambiguation)
- Means (disambiguation)
- Meen (disambiguation)
