= Lenox Lyceum =

Concert hall in New York City

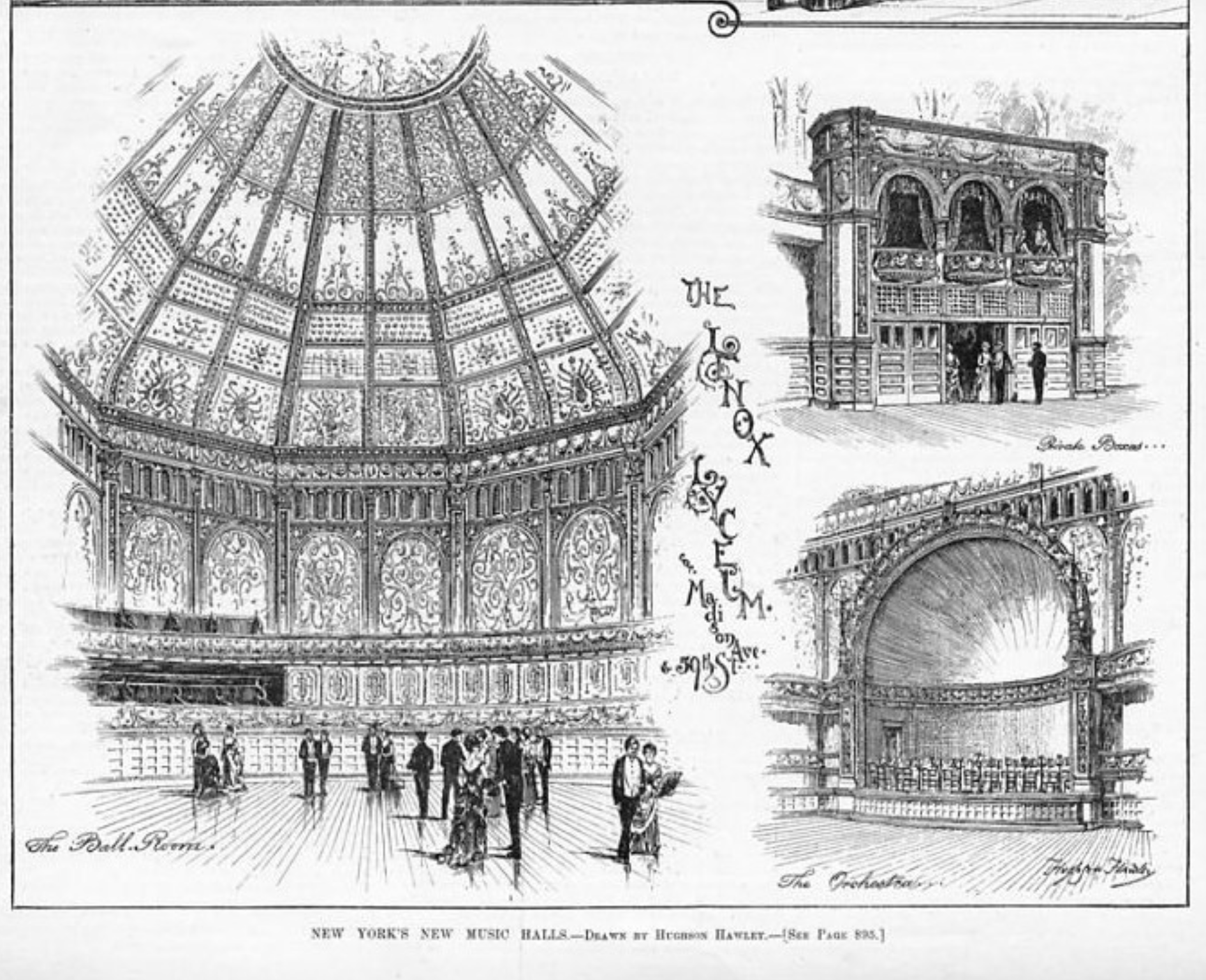
- 1899 illustration
- Interactive map of Lenox Lyceum
- Former names: New German Theater, Plaza Music Hall, Loew's Plaza Theatre, Plaza Theatre
- Address: 623 Madison Avenue
- Location: Manhattan, New York City, US
- Coordinates: 40.7632°N 73.9712°W

The Lenox Lyceum was a concert hall and event space located at 623 Madison Avenue at the corner with 59th Street, in the Upper East Side of Manhattan, New York City, United States. It was built in 1889 with the initial intent of providing New York City with a concert venue for symphony performances. Inaugurated on January 2, 1890, it served not only as a venue for orchestral concerts, but also periodically for opera and other types of music and theatre performances. Because it contained a ballroom as well as a theatre, it was used for public dances, banquets, exhibitions, and other events. In 1908, it underwent a major renovation and was converted into the New German Theater (NGT). It served as the resident venue for a German-language repertory theatre company led by Maurice Baumfeld during the 1908–1909 season.

After the failure of the NGT, the venue became a vaudeville theatre in April 1909 known as the Plaza Music Hall that was operated by the William Morris Agency. In March 1911, it was acquired by Marcus Loew. Under Loew it eventually became a cinema, Loew's Plaza Theatre, in c. 1912. It later became the Plaza Theatre. It was acquired by Leo Brecher in 1917 and was demolished in 1929. It should not be confused with the Plaza Theatre at 58th St and Madison, which opened in 1930 and took its name from the former theatre on 59th St.

== History ==
=== Lenox Lyceum ===
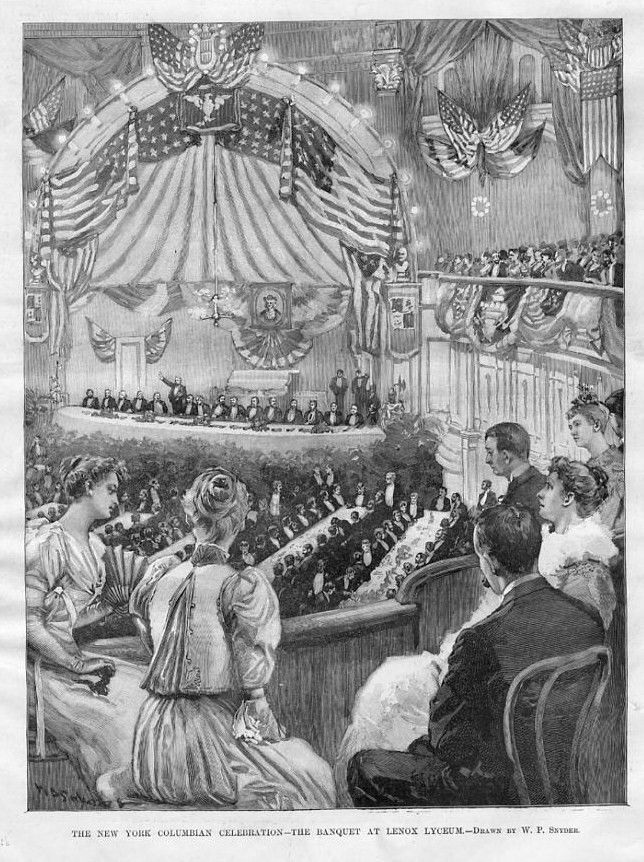
Banquet at the Lenox Lyceum during the New York Columbian Celebration of 1892. This was part of a five day long city wide event held in October 1892 honoring the quadricentennial of the first voyage of Christopher Columbus in 1492.

The Lenox Lyceum (LL) was built by New York City contractor and real estate developer John D. Crimmins. Crimmins was at that time Commissioner of the New York City Department of Parks and Recreation, and the planned LL had the backing of the city government. The initial plan for the LL was to convert what was commonly referred to as "the old panorama building" (also known as the Monitor and Merrimac Building) on Madison Avenue into a music hall for Theodore Thomas and his orchestra. Transformation of the building into a performance venue under this plan began in 1888 but it was abandoned after the announcement to build Carnegie Hall. The competition from it, and the planned Madison Square Garden led Crimmins, Thomas, and the city to increase the project to a grander scale of higher quality in order to make the venue successful.

New plans were formulated, the old panorama building was demolished and a completely new structure was built on the property in 1889. The theatre in the LL had an unusual polygonal design. The Philadelphia Times stated that the LL sat 1500 people and "combined the best features of a theatre, ballroom, lecture auditorium, and a dining hall." The design for the theatre included what was claimed as the "first electronic light tower". The choreographer and ballroom operator Edward Ferrero was the original lessee of the theatre, and he ran it through 1899.

The LL was officially inaugurated on January 2, 1890, with a performance by Theodore Thomas's orchestra. In 1890–1891 Thomas conducted several concerts at the LL featuring music by mainly American composers, among them Rudolph Aronson, Frederick Grant Gleason, Victor Herbert, John Knowles Paine, Herman Rietzel, and Harry Rowe Shelley. The concerts tended to feature popular music, but at times Thomas and his orchestra would play more serious masterworks by major composers. Victor Herbert shared conducting duties with Thomas, and his cantata The Captive was given its world premiere at the LL in September 1891. Soloists who performed with the Thomas's orchestra at the LL included pianist Leopold Godowsky, violinist Franz Wilczek, and soprano Anna Mooney Burch.

The LL was used for a banquet celebrating the centennial of the founding of the Federal judiciary of the United States on February 4, 1890. The Supreme Court of the United States and former American president Grover Cleveland were seated on the stage of the hall. James C. Carter was the toastmaster at the event, and speeches were given by Cleveland, chief justice Melville Fuller, and justice John Marshall Harlan among others. The April 1, 1890, edition of Western Electrician reported on a demonstration of the Edison Manufacturing Company's kinetoscope technology at the LL making it one of the earliest demonstrations of film technology. However, the kintescope technology was still under development; the images displayed were unlikely to be moving images and more likely a presentation of the projection component of Edison's invention with still images. Edison had earlier demonstrated twelve of his Edison's Phonograph Dolls at the LL in 1889.

On October 1, 1890, the LL was one of two venues that gave the first performances in New York City of Pietro Mascagni's opera Cavalleria rusticana. The LL staging was the authorized version as its producer, Oscar Hammerstein I, had purchased the rights to performance in the United States. However, its evening performance on that day was not the first, as Rudolph Aronson of the Casino Theatre, rushed to grab the first performance credit by giving an unauthorized matinee performance of the opera. Hammerstein sued and the Casino version was forced to close. The LL cast was led by Georgine von Januschofsky as Santuzza with her husband Adolf Neuendorff conducting. In April 1891 soprano Olga Islar performed at the LL with the Metropolitan Opera Orchestra and conductor Anton Seidl.

In 1892 the Spanish Benevolent Society held its annual ball at the LL which was attended by the Cuban nationalist poet José Martí. On March 27, 1892, Walter Damrosch conducted the premiere of Reginald De Koven's March of the Gnomes at the LL. The following December, Anton Seidl conducted a performance of La Gioconda with Emma Juch in the tile role and Clara Poole King as Laura. On February 20, 1893 the New York City Police broke up a Mardi Gras banquet sponsored by the French Consulate, evicting 1500 French people from the venue. The diners, participating in a tame family-oriented event, were targeted because of a wild party, the French Ball (February 11, 1893), that had created headlines earlier that month and embarrassed the city in the press. That same year the LL was the main venue for the World's Candy Exposition. In mid December 1889 a large event honoring archbishop Michael Corrigan just prior to his pilgrimage to the Vatican was held at the LL.

In February 1894 Professor Mike Donovan gave a boxing exhibition at the LL as a fundraiser for the New York Athletic Club. The early short film Gladiatorial Combat (1895) starring Duncan C. Ross features a fight between two swordsmen on the stage of the LL. French writer and critic Ferdinand Brunetière lectured on the Alliance française at the LL during his visit to the United States in 1897. On October 14, 1899 Theodore Roosevelt addressed a largely African-American audience at the LL during his campaign for Governor of New York.

In the early 20th century the LL was used frequently for fairs, bicycle tournaments, and exhibitions. In the summer of 1900 conductor Paul Steindorf led a season of light opera at the LL beginning with a production of The Mikado. This was followed by The Bohemian Girl with a cast led by May Fiske and Henry C. Peakes. The LL was used temporarily as an armory by the 71st New York Infantry Regiment after a fire damaged the regiment's armory. 'They were in residence at the LL in 1904 when a construction on a new armory began. The leader of the band of the 71st regiment was composer Francesco Fanciulli whose romaze, Love Story, was premiered at the LL by cellist Louis Blumenberg in March 1903.

=== New German Theater ===
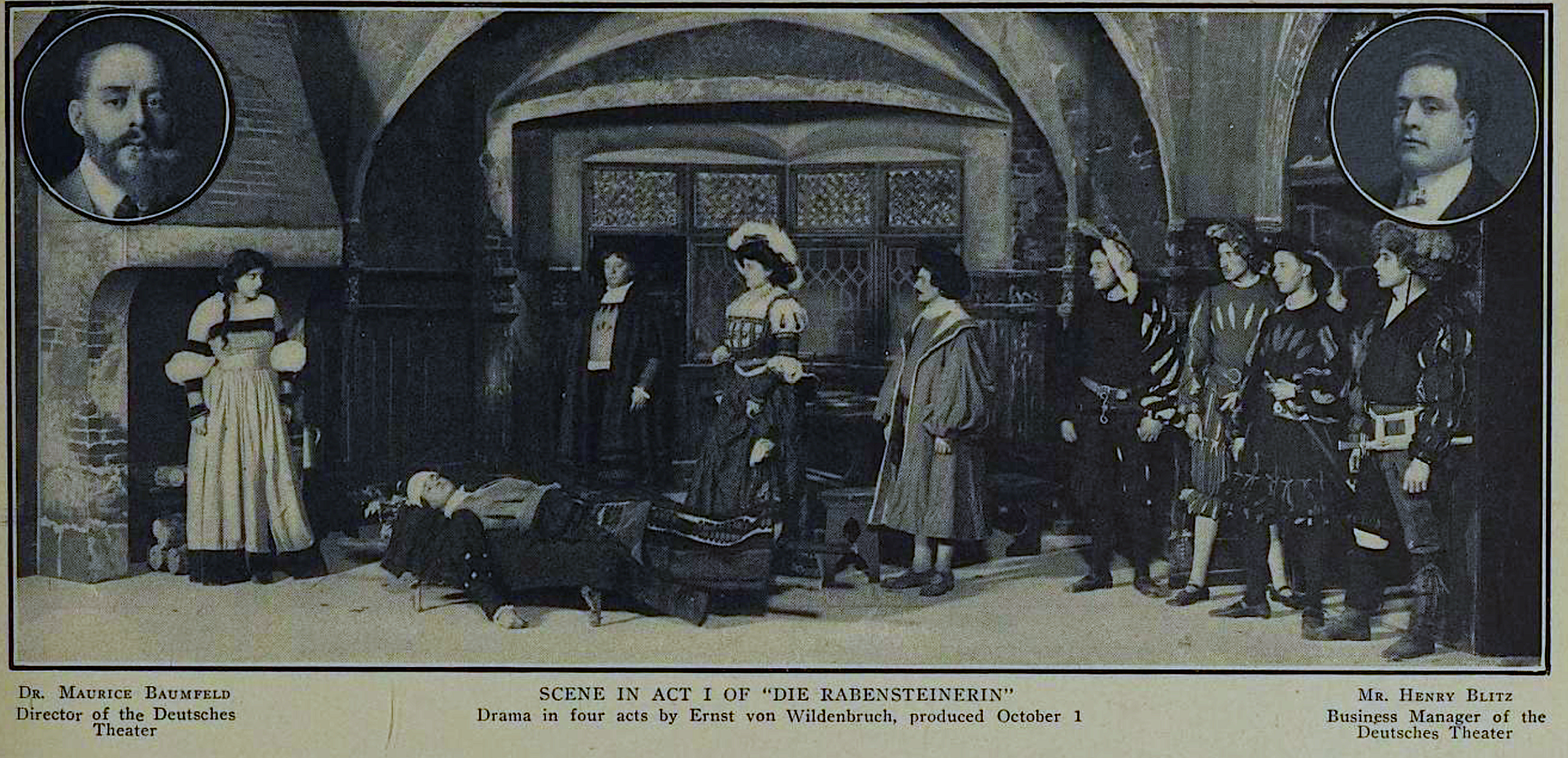
Cast of Die Rabensteinerin for the opening of the New German Theater on October 1, 1908.

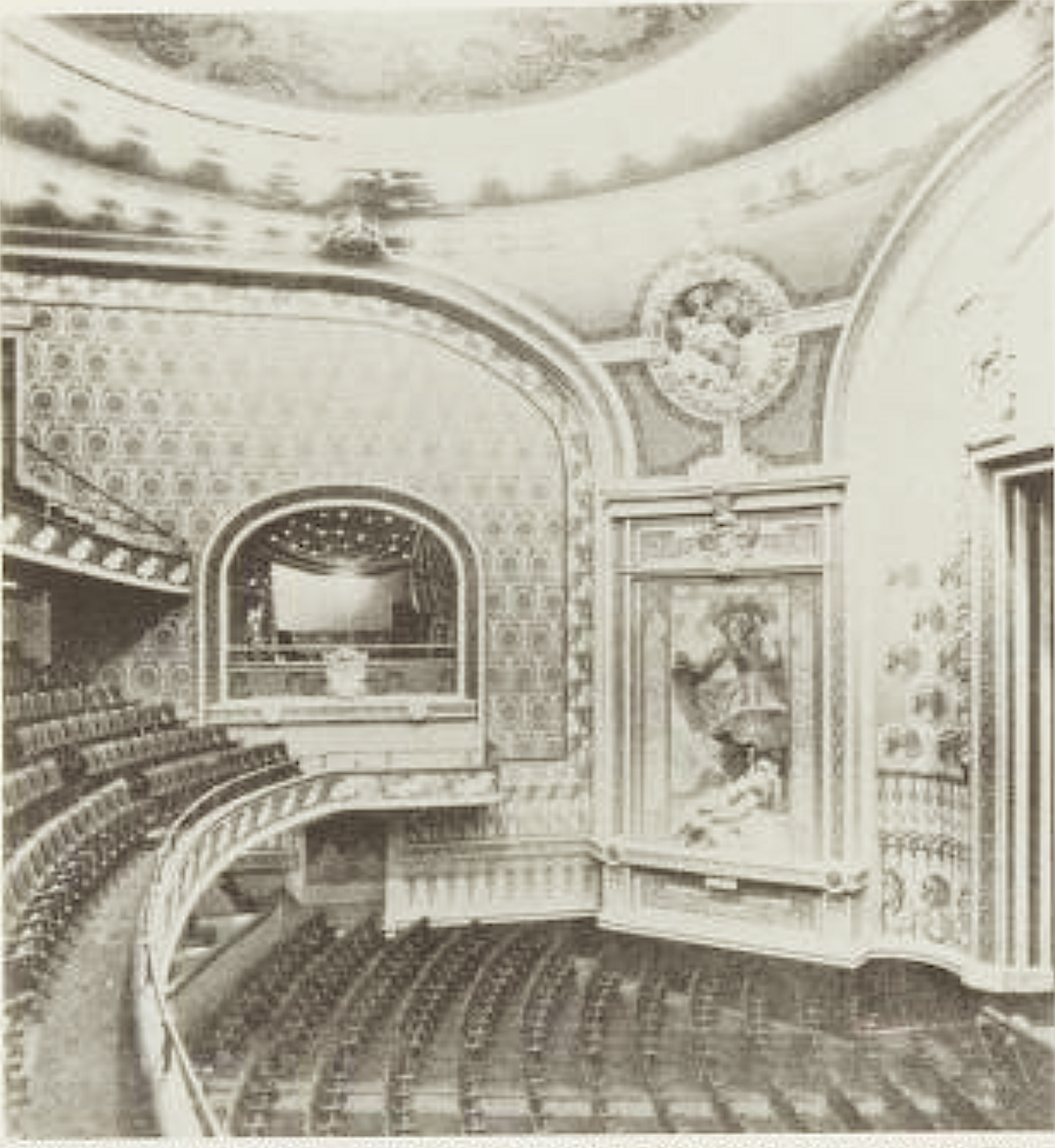
1908 photograph of the interior of the New German Theater by Herts & Tallant.

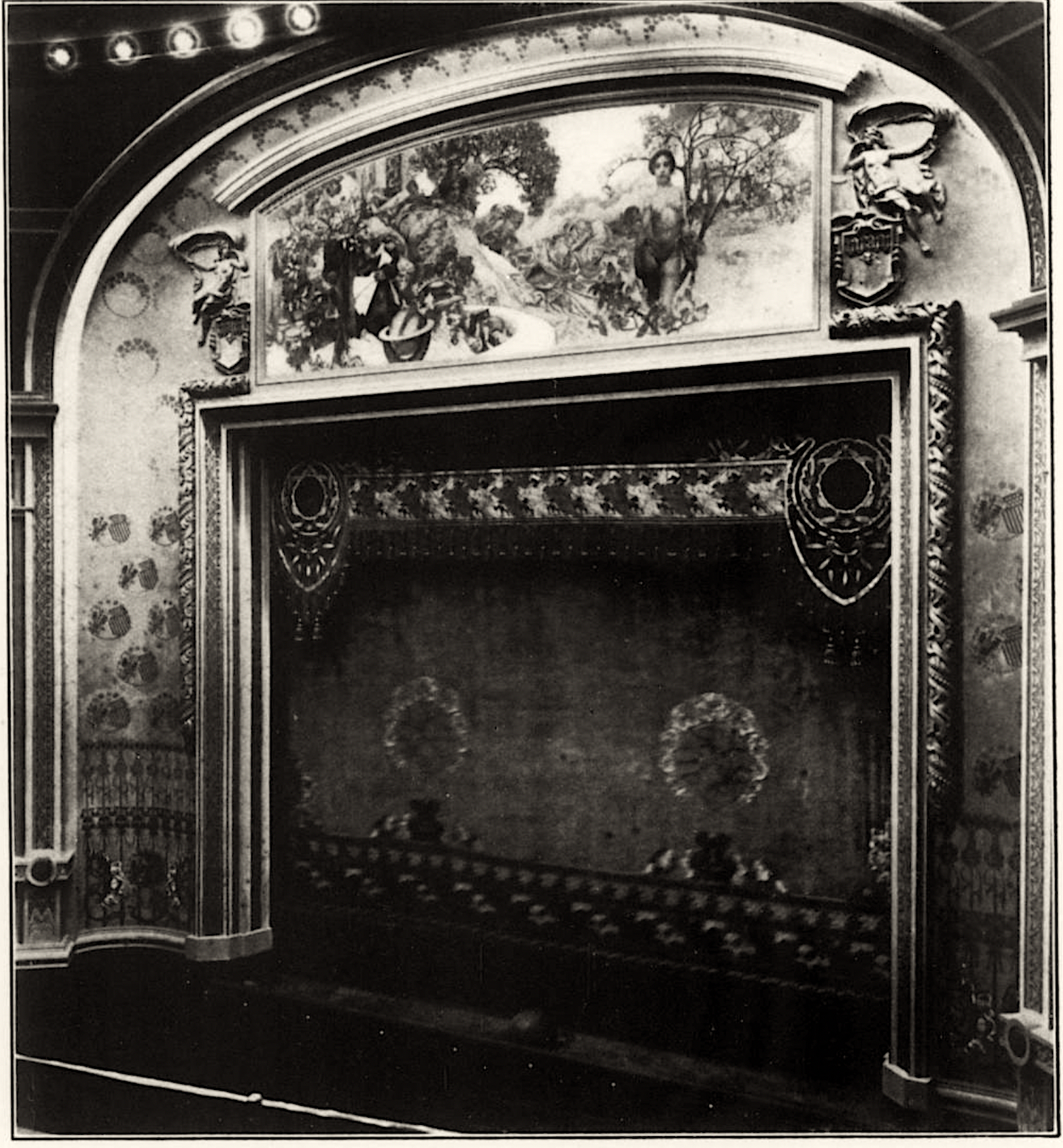
Stage of New German Theater with Alphonse Mucha's painting The Quest for Beauty.

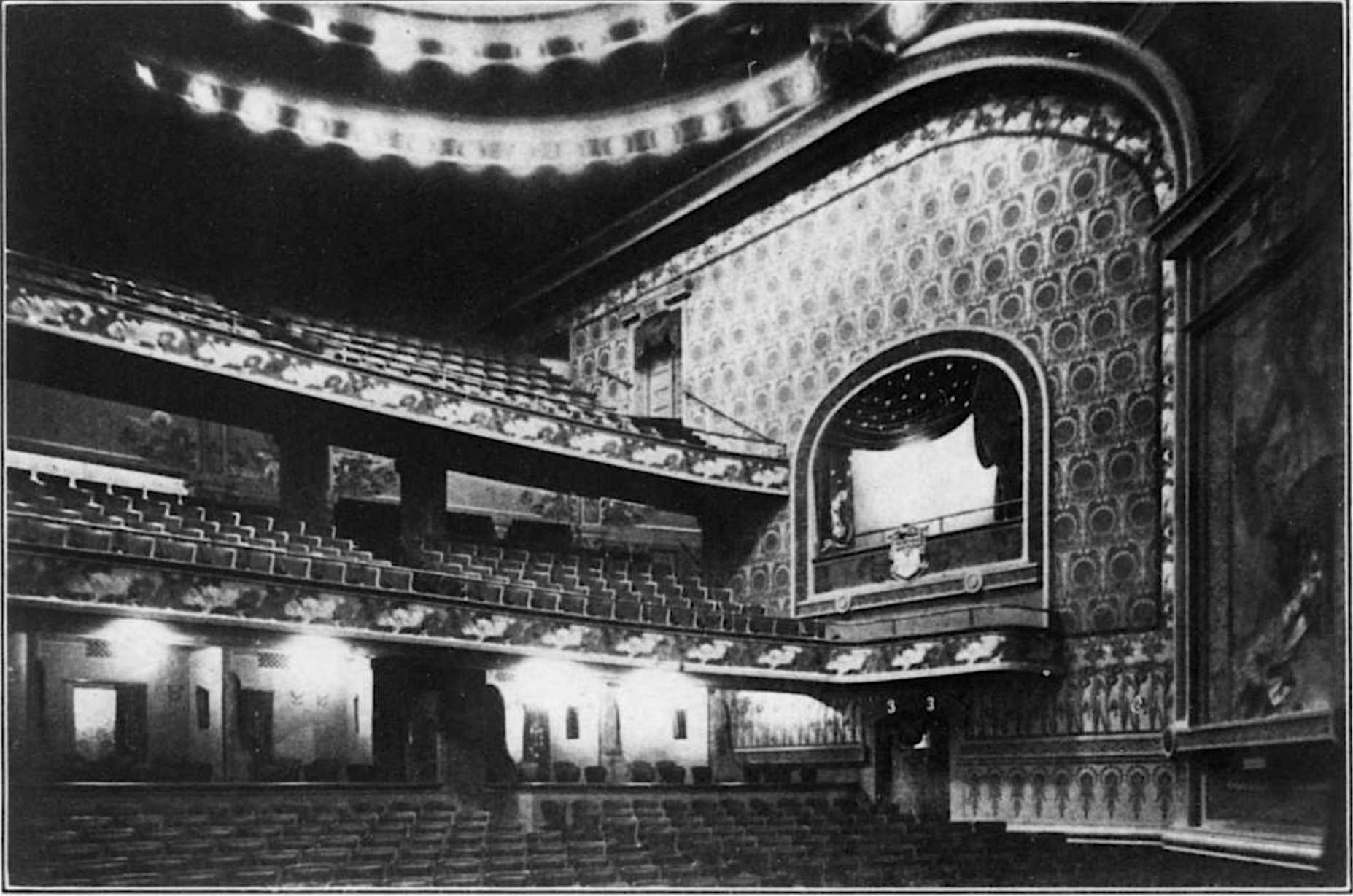
Another photograph by Herts & Tallant.

In 1908 Walter J. Salmon Sr., the owner of the LL, leased the theatre to Maurice Baumfeld of the German Theatre company. Under Salmon's supervision significant alterations and renovations to the theatre began in April 1908, and it was renamed the New German Theater (sometimes given as New German Theatre, also referred to as Neues Deutsches Theater). The redesigned theatre removed columns that obstructed views of the stage, and the seating capacity was diminished to 1200 people. Architecture firm Hedman and Schoen (Axel S. Hedman & Eugene Schoen) oversaw the design and construction which included a new facade on the exterior of the building, and artist Alphonse Mucha was hired to create murals and other interior designs to decorate the theatre. These included stencils in the shape of abstract plant forms, and a giant painting, The Quest for Beauty, above the proscenium.

The NGT opened on October 1, 1908, with a performance of Ernst von Wildenbruch's drama Die Rabensteinerin. This was immediately followed by a production of Ferenc Molnár's The Devil with Eugen Burg in the title role. It toured to the Brooklyn Academy of Music. Other actors in the NGT company included Hedwiga Reicher, Carl Sick, Bianca Froehlich, Ilse von Tasso, Emil Lind, Mara Korff, Harry Liedtke, Martha Spier, Ferdinand Steil, Madame Neuendorff, and Kurt Grosser. Japanese actress Madame Fuki-Ko was a guest performer at the NGT in November 1908 and performed the one act Japanese play The Vampire Cat of Nabéshima in a triple bill with two German one-act plays. In February 1909 Conrad Dreher joined the company to star in Oscar Blumenthal and Max Bernstein's comedy Matthias Gollinger. Dreher also penned the play Zechpreller which was given at the NGT in March 1909.

The NGT was not successful and only lasted for the 1908–1909 season. Some of the other plays performed by the NGT included Gustav Wied's 2 x 2 = 5 (1908), Pierre Wolff's Das Grosse Geheimnis (1908), Friedrich Schiller's The Robbers (1908), Ludwig Ganghofer and Marco Brociner's The Wedding of Valeni (1908), Carl Rössler and Ludwig Heller's Wolken Kratzer (1908), Robert und Bertram (1908, either the play by Gustav Räder or one based on it), Henri Bernstein's La Griffe (1909, given in a German language translation Die Kralle), Schiller's William Tell (1909), Benno Rauchenegger's Jaegerblut (1909), Der Blaue Teufel (1909), Oscar Wilde's Salome (1909), and Gerhart Hauptmann's The Weavers (1909). After the company of the NGT departed, a touring light opera company temporarily took over the theater to give performances of Franz Lehár's operetta Der Rastelbinder in early April 1909.

=== Plaza Music Hall / Plaza Theatre ===
In February 1909 it was announced the Shubert brothers had acquired the NGT for the 1909–1910 season and that it would join its theatre empire as the Plaza Theatre. However, this plan never came to fruition, and in April 1909 the NGT was leased instead by William Morris of the William Morris Agency. It was re-named the Plaza Music Hall (PMH) as a venue for vaudeville, re-opening under that name on April 19, 1909, with a program headlined by Julian Eltinge, Edith Helena, Rice & Cady, and Saharet.

Some of the other vaudeville performers who worked at the PMH during its history included Mr. and Mrs. Sidney Drew (1909); Scottish actress Cecilia Loftus (1909); John C. Rice and his partner Sally Cohen (1910); British singer and actress Lucy Weston (1910); Irish tenor Joseph Sheehan (1910); the Empire City Quartet (1910); English singer and comedian George Lashwood (1911); comedy team Montgomery and Moore (1911); husband and wife duo Charles Ross and Mabel Fenton (1911), sidewalk pitchman Charles Kenna (1911); comedy duo Bert Clark and Mabel Hamilton (1911); and The Pendleton Sisters (1911).

The PMH served as both a venue for variety theatre and as a legitimate theatre for touring repertory theatre companies. In 1910, the Vale Stock Company performed a season of plays there for a few months before the theatre reverted once again to vaudeville variety entertainment. It was still operating as the PMH as late as March 1911 when it was acquired by Marcus Loew. Loew converted the theatre into a cinema as a part of his movie theatre empire. It operated variously as Loew's Plaza Theatre and the Plaza Theatre. In 1917 it was purchased by Leo Brecher and operated as part of Brecher's small group of theaters until it was demolished in 1929.
