= Ben H. Procter =

American historian (1927–2012)

Ben Hamill Procter
- Born: February 21, 1927; Temple, Texas, U.S.
- Died: April 17, 2012 (aged 85)
- Education: Austin High School; University of Texas at Austin; Harvard University
- Occupations: Historian; Professor at Texas Christian University
- Political party: Democratic
- Spouse: Phoebe Carole Procter
- Children: Ben Rice Procter
- Parent(s): Hazel Barnes and Leslie Chambers Procter

Ben Hamill Procter (February 21, 1927 – April 17, 2012) was a historian who served from 1957 to 2000 on the faculty of Texas Christian University in Fort Worth, Texas.

A native of Temple, Texas, Procter moved with his family to Austin, where he graduated from Stephen F. Austin High School. He obtained Bachelor of Arts and master's degrees from the University of Texas at Austin. He then received a second master's degree and his Ph.D. from Harvard University in Cambridge, Massachusetts. He served in the United States Navy during the last months of World War II. From 1979 to 1980, Procter was the president of the Texas State Historical Association. Before he became a history professor, he played football briefly with the Los Angeles Rams until his athletic focus was halted by an injury.

Procter held the Cecil and Ida Green Emeritus chair in the TCU History Department. He received the Summerfield R. Roberts Award for best book contribution to Texas history. He was a Minnie Stevens Piper Foundation fellow, honored for teaching and research. He was a biographer of newspaper publisher William Randolph Hearst and U.S. Senator John Henninger Reagan.

Donald R. Walker (1941–2016), professor emeritus of history at Texas Tech University in Lubbock, called Procter "among the most respected and admired members of the history profession in Texas. He will be missed by students, colleagues. and other historians. ... May he rest in peace."

== Selected publications ==
- Procter, Ben H. (2007). William Randolph Hearst: The Later Years, 1911–1951. New York: Oxford University Press. ISBN 978-0-19-532534-8.
- Procter, Ben H. (1998). William Randolph Hearst: The Early Years, 1863–1910. New York: Oxford University Press. ISBN 0-19-511277-6.
- Jennings, N.A. (1992). Ben H. Procter (ed.). A Texas Ranger. St. Louis, MO: Lakeside Press. ASIN B001FDE606. (with a foreword by J. Frank Dobie)
  - Scribner published A Texas Ranger by Napoleon Augustus Jennings (1856–1919) in 1899. Jennings was married to the singer Edith Helena.
- Procter, Ben H. (1986). The Battle of the Alamo. Austin, TX: Texas State Historical Association. ISBN 0-87611-081-2.
- Procter, Ben H.; Archie P. McDonald (1980). The Texas Heritage. St. Louis, MO: Forum Press. ISBN 0-88273-001-0. (4th edition, 2003)
- Kinch Jr., Sam; Ben H. Procter (1972). Texas Under a Cloud. Austin, TX: Jenkins Publishing Co. OCLC 654396609. Procter, Ben; Sam Kinch, Jr (January 1979). 1984 edition. ISBN 978-0836300963.
- Procter, Ben H. (1962). Not Without Honor: The Life of John H. Reagan. Austin: University of Texas Press. ISBN 978-0-292-70099-4. (See John Henninger Reagan.)
