= Anna Mooney Burch =

American soprano (c.1862–1905)

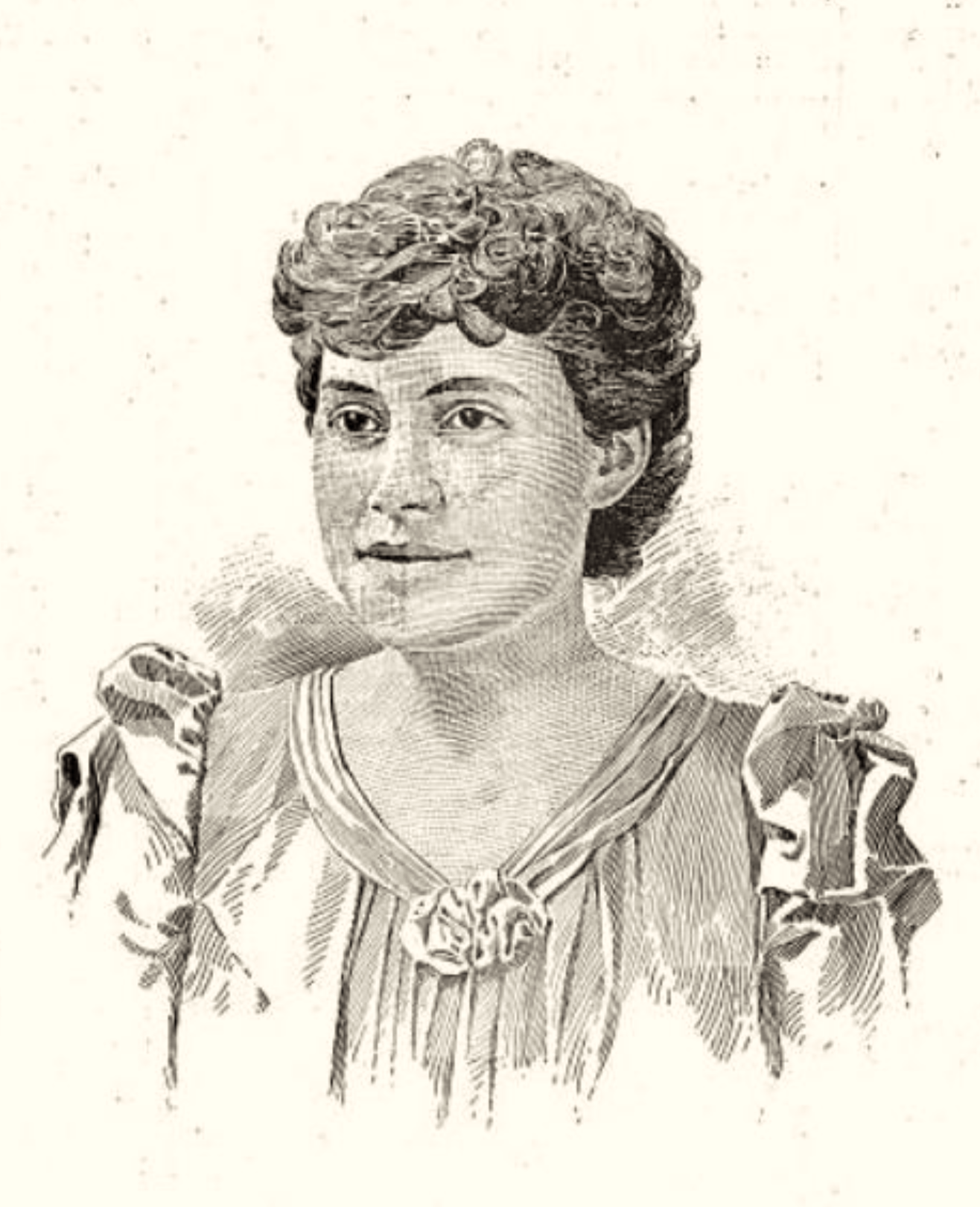
Anna Mooney Burch from the front cover of the October 29, 1890, edition of the Musical Courier

Anna Elizabeth Mooney, also known by her married name Anna Burch or Anna Mooney Burch, (c. 1862 – died 24 January 1905) was an American soprano. She was a well-known concert singer in oratorios during the 1880s and 1890s. She was also a prominent singer in churches in New York City.

== Early life and education ==
Born Anna Elizabeth Mooney, sources disagree on the location of her birth with various publications stating she was born in either Brooklyn, Hyde Park, or Fishkill, New York. She was the fourth daughter of James and Anna Mooney, and grew up in the Eastern District of Brooklyn. She studied singing in New York City with Achille Errani. By January 1885 she was working as a singer at St. Paul's Methodist Episcopal Church in Manhattan (then located at Fourth Avenue and 22nd Street; now Church of St. Paul and St. Andrew). She left that post the following April at the time she left the United States for England to pursue studies in music. There she was a pupil of Achille Rivarde.

== Career ==
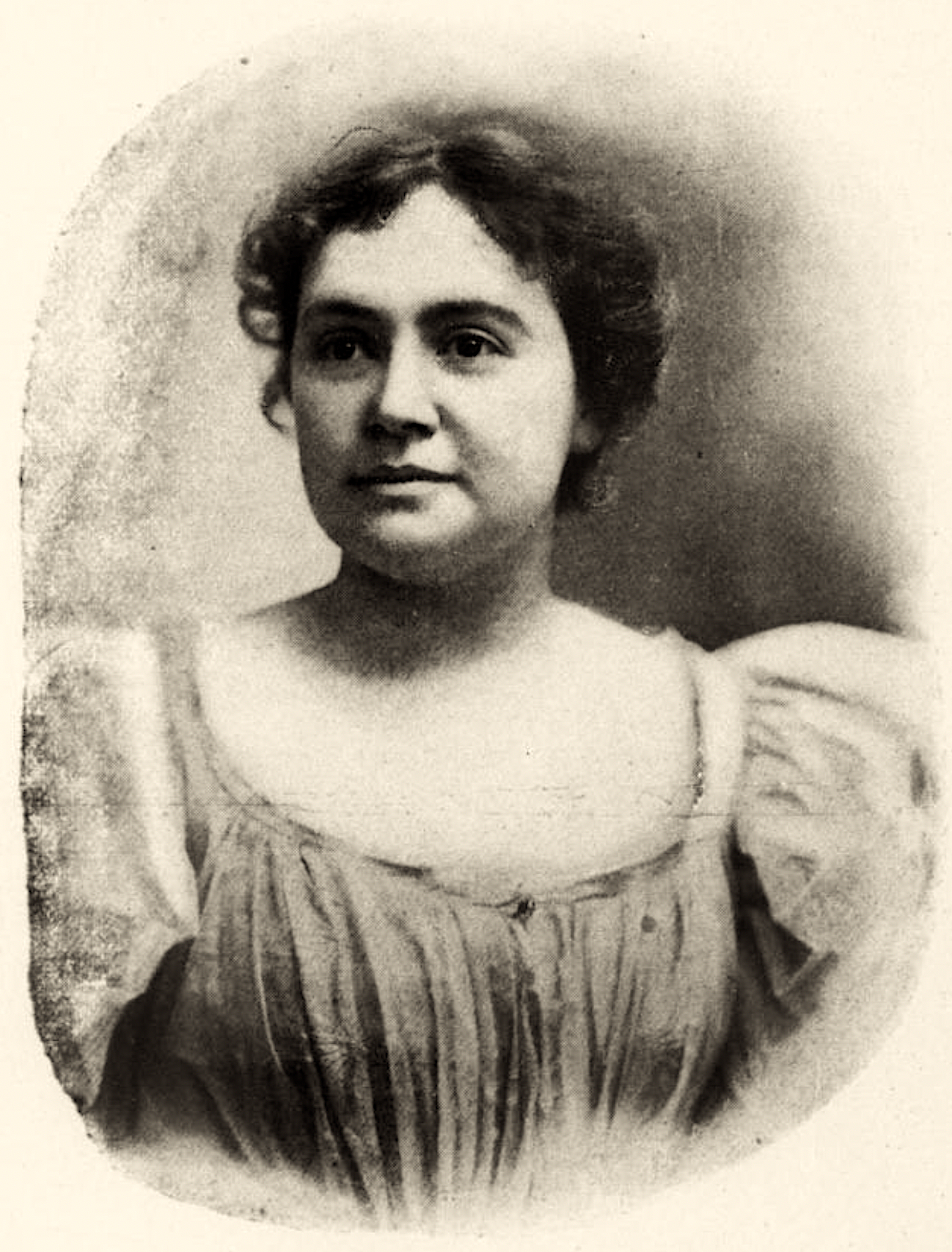
Photograph of Anne Burch by Aimé Dupont

By October 1886, Anna was back in New York performing with the Amphion Musical Society of Brooklyn, with her fellow soloist being the baritone Charles R. Burch who was the son of minister Thomas H. Burch. She had previously performed with Burch in 1884 when the pair performed in a concert together with the organist and composer Smith Newell Penfield at Christ Church on Bedford Avenue in Williamsburg, Brooklyn. She married Charles R. Burch in Brooklyn on December 21, 1886 and thereafter performed under the names Anna Mooney Burch or Anna Burch.

In the autumn of 1886, Mooney Burch became a soprano in Charles Mortimer Wiske's Wiske Concert Company. With this group she performed at the Stillman Music Hall in New Jersey (1886), Smithsonian Hall in Brooklyn (1886), and the Brooklyn Academy of Music (1890 and 1891). Other early concert engagements included performances with the Shubert Society in Manhattan and both the Brooklyn Choral Society and the Cecilia Society of Brooklyn. In 1888 she gave a recital at Puritan Church in Brooklyn, New York. For ten years she was a resident soprano at Marble Collegiate Church in Manhattan; resigning from her position in 1898. After this, she was a soprano at Tabernacle Methodist Episcopal Church in Greenpoint, Brooklyn.

In 1890, Mooney Burch performed in two concerts under conductor Theodore Thomas at the Lenox Lyceum. An illustration of her was printed on the front cover of the October 29, 1890 edition of Musical Courier. In December 1890 she was the soprano soloist in Handel's Messiah at Jacob's Theatre in Newark, New Jersey with the Shubert Vocal Society; a work she later repeated with the Ottawa Philharmonic Society (1892), the Handel and Haydn Society of Boston (1893), and the Washington Choral Society with an orchestra led by Walter Damrosch (1893).

In 1891, Mooney Burch toured North America in concerts with English baritone Charles Santley. In April 1891 she sang the title part in Jules Massenet's oratorio Ève with the Toronto Philharmonic Society (TPS) and Santley performing the part of Adam. She had previously performed this work at the Lenox Lyceum with Theodore Thomas's orchestra. She also performed the part of the Widow in Felix Mendelssohn's Elijah with the TPS in 1891. She later repeated the part of Eve in performances of the oratorio with the New York Symphony Orchestra (NYSO) in Baltimore and Washington, D.C. (1893) the Montreal Philharmonic Society at Windsor Hall (1893), and as part of a concert series at the Waldorf Astoria New York with Wiske conducting the Choral Society of Patterson (1897).

In 1892, Mooney Burch was a soloist with the Cleveland Philharmonic (no relation to the present orchestra). In April 1892 she was a soloist in concerts presented by British tenor Edward Lloyd at Madison Square Garden (MSG). She returned to MSG the following December to perform in concert with the Orpheus Society led by conductor Arthur Mees. That same month she performed in concerts with the Dutch violinist Johannes Wolff and Portuguese pianist José Vianna da Motta at Palmer's Theatre. In 1893 she was the soprano soloist in Hector Berlioz's La Damnation de Faust with the NYSO for performances in Baltimore and Washington, D.C. She had previously performed the work with this orchestra at New York's Metropolitan Opera House.

In 1894, Mooney Burch was a soloist with Brooklyn Oratorio Society at the Brooklyn Academy of Music (BAM), and appeared in concerts at the BAM again the following year. In 1897 she sang for the inaugural opening the newly built YWCA building in Harlem, and gave a recital at Barnard College. In 1898 she was soprano soloist in Friedrich Hegar's Manasse with the Arion Society of Milwaukee, and performed excerpts from Gluck's Alceste in a concert at New York City's Mendelssohn Hall with an orchestra led by Hermann Hans Wetzler. That same year she was the soprano soloist in the Shubert Society's performances of Joseph Haydn's The Creation and Berlioz's La Damnation de Faust.

== Death ==
Anna Mooney Burch died in New York City on January 24, 1905. She is buried in Cypress Hills Cemetery.
