= Eugenie Pappenheim =

Austrian-American operatic soprano

Eugenie Pappenheim

Eugenie Pappenheim (15 February 1848 – 11 May 1924) was an Austrian-American operatic soprano. She began her career in Linz in 1866 and was active in theaters in both Austria and Germany until moving to the United States in 1875. While she continued to occasionally return to Europe as a guest artist at major venues like the Berlin Hofoper and La Scala, she was mainly active as an opera singer in America until her retirement from the stage in 1889. She was a leading soprano at New York City's Academy of Music during the 1870s and 1880s; notably serving as prima donna of the Mapleson Opera Company during its historic rivalry with the Metropolitan Opera. She is remembered for performing roles in the United States premieres of several operas by Richard Wagner. She had a long second career as a voice teacher in New York City, and spent the last year and a half of her life in poor health in Los Angeles.

== Early Life and career ==
Eugenie Pappenheim was born in Vienna on 15 February 1848. (Note: Both Pappenheim's obituary in Musical America and the Deutsche Biographische Enzyklopädie state she was born in 1849. The California, U.S., Death Index, 1905-1939 states she was 82 at the time of her death and gives an estimated year of birth as 1842. However, the Grosses Sängerlexikon says she was born in 1848. The 1848 birth year matches European government primary documents which report her exact date of birth as 15 February 1848.) She made her professional debut in Linz in 1866 as Valentine in Les Huguenots at the age of 17. Further engagements in Germany and Austria followed; including performances at opera houses in Leipzig, Vienna, Schwerin, Braunschweig, and Hamburg. She had a great triumph in Berlin as Leonore in Fidelio. In 1873 she performed in the world premiere of Ferdinand Langer's Dornröschen in Mannheim. She earlier had success in Mannheim in Der fliegende Holländer in 1872 with the composer in attendance. Wagner stated she was "the Senta I had dreamed of".

== Career in the United States and international guest artist ==
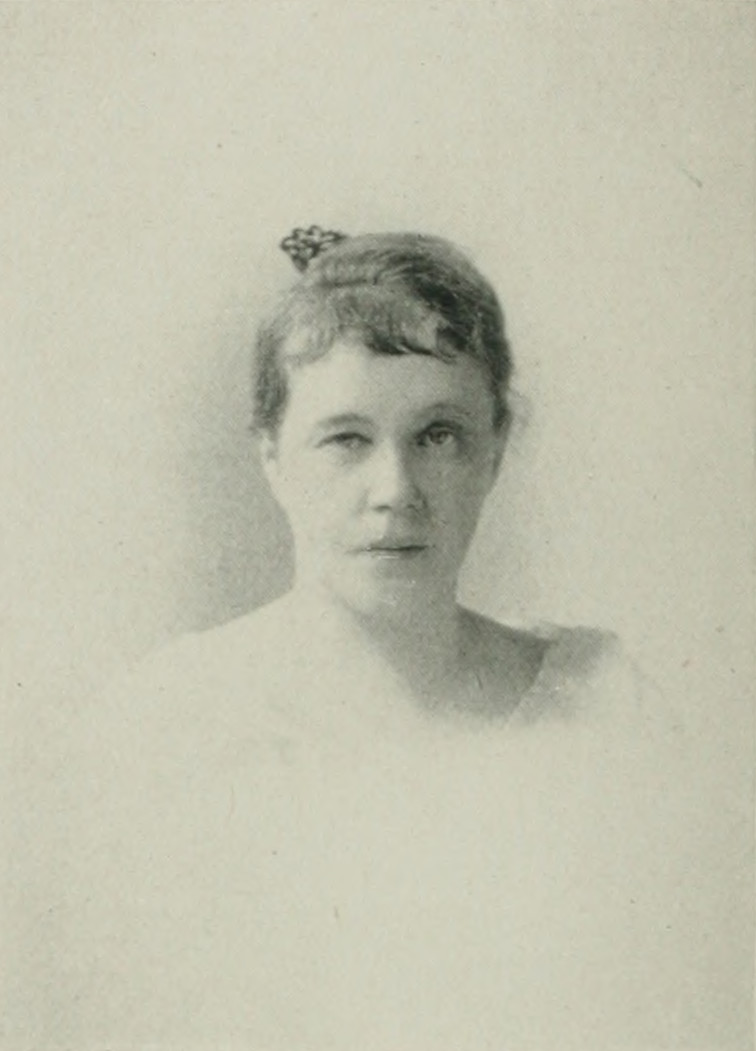
Eugenie Pappenheim

In 1875, Pappenheim emigrated to America as a member of Theodor Wachtel's Wachtel Opera Company. She gave her first performance in the United States at the Academy of Music, New York City as Valentine on October 18, 1875 under the baton of Adolf Neuendorff. On January 2, 1876 she married Thomas Arens in New York City. Her husband experienced a mental health crises and was placed in an asylum about a month after their wedding.

In 1875 Pappenheim returned to Europe to sing as a prima donna with the Berlin Hofoper. On November 8, 1876, she appeared as Senta in the American premiere of The Flying Dutchman at Philadelphia's Academy of Music in a production that was sung in Italian rather than German. On April 2, 1877 she returned to New York's Academy of Music to portray Brünnhilde in Die Walküre for that opera's American premiere. She also had great success in New York in this period as Elsa in Lohengrin.

In 1877, she founded her own opera company with other musicians, with whom she undertook a tour of the US. The Adams-Pappenheim Opera Company was named after her and the tenor Charles R. Adams. This company presented the American premiere of Wagner's Rienzi at New York's Academy of Music on 4 March 1878. Several biographical profiles on Pappenheim state she sang Irene in this production, but this is contradicted by critical reviews in the New York press which state she played the trouser role of Adriano and Alexandre Human was Irene.

From 1878 to 1887 Pappenheim was a member of James Henry Mapleson's opera company in residence at New York's Academy of Music; serving as Mapelson's prima donna during the company's great rivalry with the Metropolitan Opera ("the Met"). Opera impresario and music writer Robert Grau (brother of the Met's director Maurice Grau) wrote the following in his book Forty Years Observation of Music and the Drama (1909):

"Throughout the 1880s Madame Pappenheim was in her zenith, and all periods in her remarkable artistic career she was one of the most imposing figures in the history of grand opera. Although she sang principally in German opera and gave to that precarious field much of its needed stability, still in Italian opera she was just as potent and the Academy of Music has been the scene of her greatest triumphs. Her Leonora in Trovatore has never been surpassed."

Pappenheim portrayed Reiza in von Weber's Oberon at Her Majesty's Theater in London in 1879. She also sang at the Frankfurt Opera in 1881 and at La Scala in 1883. She retired from performance in 1889.

== Later life and death ==
After her stage career ended, Pappenheim worked as a singing teacher in New York. In late 1888 she joined the voice faculty of the National Conservatory of Music of America in New York. One of her students was coloratura soprano Frida Benneche. In 1894 she married Rudolf Ballin, a man who was at that time a member of the Board of Fire Underwriters in New York City. Their marriage ended upon Rudolf's death in New York City in 1922. After the death of her husband she moved to Los Angeles on account of ill health with hopes that the climate in California would assist her. She lived in declining health in L.A. during the last year and a half of her life.

While the Deutsche Biographische Enzyklopädie states that Pappenheim died in Los Angeles, California in June 1924, American newspaper sources and her death certificate in the California, U.S., Death Index, 1905-1939 state she died earlier on 11 May 1924. In her will, Ballin bequeathed 10,000 US dollars each to the cities of Hamburg and Vienna, with which she felt particularly connected; under the condition that the money should benefit poor Hamburg children. Accordingly, the city of Hamburg established the Rudolf Ballin Foundation in 1925, which eighty years later in 2005 was operating twelve day-care centres for children.
