= List of theaters in Newark, New Jersey =

This list of theaters and entertainment venues in Newark, New Jersey includes past and present opera houses and theaters, cabarets, music halls and other places of live entertainment in the city.

Here is a list of historical theatres and movie houses:

Name	Address	Built	Seats	Association	Closure	Significance	Current Status
New Jersey Performing Arts Center	1 Center Street	1997	2,868	?	-	Performing arts theatre	Operational
CityPlex 12 Newark	360-394 Springfield Avenue/Bergen Street	1993	2,600	Sony Theatres, Loews	-	Movie theatre started as six screens and later became 12 screens. Ownership is Shaquille O'Neal, retired basketball player.	Operational
Newark Symphony Hall	1020 Broad Street	1925	2,800	?	-	Was used as vaudeville and movie house. Dance Studio and live theatre with Symphony Concerts. Previously known as "Salaam Temple," "Mosque Theatre."	Operational
All Jersey Multiplex Cinemas	104 Foundry Street	1991	?	National Amusements	2006	Movie theatre with 12 screens on former drive-thru movie theatre	Closed and demolished in 2014
Newark Drive-Thru	170 Foundry Street	1955	2,500 cars	Redstone Drive-In Theatres	1985	First showings of Kirk Douglas in Man Without a Star and Edward G. Robinson in A Bullet for Joey. Three screens in 1982. Outdoor movie theatre.	Closed and a movie theatre built same location in 1991
National Theatre	182-184 Irvine Turner Boulevard	1914	500	Independent Theater Service Inc.	after 1940s	Movies were selected for African-American viewing audience after the 1940s. Location of street was originally called Belmont Ave.	Closed
Adams	28 Branford Place	1912	2,037	Paramount Pictures	1986	Vaudeville and stage plays to Movie theatre. Prior to being named the Adams Theatre, it was known as the Shubert Theatre and had Vaudeville acts and picture shows. During Thanksgiving week that started on November 23, 1925, Magician Harry Houdini performed, in addition to musical comedians Eddie Buzzell and Mary Milburn, the latter were performers from Broadway theatres of New York City. Later the theatre name was changed and famous performers were booked after the two Adams brothers purchased the theatre in 1939. Such artists were the Andrews Sisters, Artie Shaw, Cab Calloway, Charlie Barnet, Duke Ellington, Eddie Cantor, Ella Fitzgerald, the Marx Brothers, Sammy Davis, Jr, and Tommy Dorsey. In 1940, Bud Abbott and Lou Costello were pictured in the Adams projector room with their agent and the owner, Mr. Adam A. Adams. In 1960, the "Stagehand Strike" occurred by the local stagehands union 21 picketing in front of the theatre during the showing of Ben Hur. The lockout (industry) by stagehand employees was also at the nearby, "Paramount Theatre," also owned by the Adams Brothers, during live stage attractions that were being shown that time.	Closed, dilapidated state of repairs
Empire Theater	265 Washington Street	1912	1,000	?	1957	Burlesque theatre, Leon Errol comedian. During different years, was an opera house, vaudeville theatre, and movie house, with the distinction as burlesque from the 1930s until February 14, 1957.	Demolished and became a parking location until a bank was built.
Ascher's Halsey Theatre	138 Market Street and Halsey Streets corner	1847	1,250	Fox	?	First Newark theatre, was live music, theatre, vaudeville, and movies. Burlesque, Leon Errol and James E. Cooper, comedians Started as Waller's Opera House and later became Waldmann's Opera House for vaudeville acts, under the Fred Waldmann ownership. In 1917, William Fox had control and named it "Fox's Carlton Theatre" for photoplays and later was known as "Gayety Theatre." The New York-based Ascher Enterprises took over on May 14, 1921, and naming "Ascher's Halsey Theatre" due a poor operations ending probably in 1922 the business.	Demolished indication.
Miner's Newark	195 Market Street	1886	1,605	?	?	Vaudeville theater started by Henry C. Miner and operated by a Brooklyn, NY theatre company, Hyde & Behman Amusement Co. Upon Miner's death in 1900, family sold in 1916 to Edward Spiegel, owner of the "Strand Theatre." Featured an orchestra floor, wood frame balcony, and private viewing areas. This theatre became known as the Paramount in 1931 under the Adams Brothers that became owners in 1921 from purchase from Spiegel. Architect Thomas W. Lamb completed redesign in 1916. 2,003 seats total capacity in 1916.	?
Branford	11-23 Branford Place	1941	3,100	Stanley-Warner, Warner Bros	1985	Emil Zucker and Herman Steiner had it built. Opened December 17, 1920 and designed by architect, Fred Wesley Wentworth. In 1968, Newark's "RKO Proctor Theatre" merged the "Branford theatre," under Stanley Warner ownership. Had a seating capacity listed also at 2,844 and September 15, 1978, had four movie screens.	Demolished in 1985.
Loew's State	635 Broad Street corner of New Street	1921	2,700	Loew's	1977	Vaudeville to first run movies. Designed by architect Thomas W. Lamb among three other theatres in New York City under Loew's. The Wizard of Oz was shown here in the release of 1939. Indicated 2,589 seats.	Closed in 1977, demolished in 1978, location is an office building.
Proctor's Palace	116 Market Street	1915	2,500	Radio-Keith-Orpheum Corporation (RKO Pictures)	1968	Vaudeville theater, movie showings and alternating vaudeville acts. During January 5, 1925 week, Magician Harry Houdini performed, in addition to "two blackface comedian" vaudeville duo, Fred Fenton and Sammy Fields, with an additional act by Neil McKay. The latter was a Scottish comedian from Proctor's Palace of New York City under the Keith Circuit. The comedian Milton Berle and straight man Archibald Leach, later to be known as Cary Grant, did comedy vaudeville in the mid-1920s at the theatre before their 1930s film careers began. Owner was Frederick F. Proctor and sold to RKO prior to death in 1929. Theatre name became known as "RKO Proctor's Theatre." Merger occurred with Branford Theatre and closed in 1968.	Closed in 1968, location is a shoe store in the lobby with vacant portions rest of building. Dilapidation.
Terminal	86-94 Park Place	1902	1,800	Fox Circuit, Proctor's	1943	Known as "Proctor’s Theatre" on January 6, 1902, opening. Will Rogers did a cowboy vaudeville stage performance for the first time of his career at Proctor's Theatre during the week of December 1908. Returned in November 8 thru 13, 1909 with his wife, Betty Blake Rogers in the audience to an unimpressed show. Two films were shown during that time, "Fun with the Manikin" and "The Bogey Woman" (French/ Pathe.) Rogers performed again in November 1911 as was contracted by F. F. Proctor in Newark and 58th Street Theatre of New York City. The theater was then operated by William Fox's Fox Circuit by 1926 and renamed Fox's Terminal Theatre. In 1941 was Skouras Theaters Corp. chain. Listed as 1,610 seating.	?
Lyric	211 Market Street, near Broad Street	1908	1,466	?	1960s	A remodeling was done in 1933 by architect Ben Schlanger.	Demolished in 1960s and land used for a newspaper printing plant. Indicated 1,200 seats.
Broad	568 Broad Street and Fulton Street	1912	1,460	?	1950	Initially known as the Sam S. Shubert Theatre on January 8, 1912. New York's Shubert family had it built. Showed movies and became burlesque as Minsky's Burlesque. Returned to movies and name changed. Indicated 1383 seats.	Closed, demolished
Proctor's Roof	116 Market Street	1915	1,450	RKO Pictures	1968	Vaudeville productions then film showings, opened November 22, 1915. Was on top of Proctor's Palace Theatre. In 1960s, a re-opening was done due to lack of film showing use, and the name changed to Penthouse Cinema for foreign movies. Closed in 1968 after Newark Riots.	?
Rialto Theatre	915 Broad Street	1920	1,250	?	1950s	Known as the "Brandt Theatre" for 1941 and 1950 movie theatre listings, 1,762 seats indicated.	Closed to a retail location and demolished
Paramount	195 Market Street	1886	1,200	Paramount-Pictures	1986	Vaudeville and later movie house. Marque has Newark name. Originally was the "Miner theatre," renovations in the 1931 for association with Paramount-Publix "talkies" movies. The Adams Brothers were owners of the theatre since purchasing from Spiegal in 1921. First silent film showing of The Great Moment was featured on their grand opening by the Adams owners in 1921. There was a live performance by Billie Holiday. The comedian and actor, Jerry Lee Lewis worked as an usher at the theatre as a native born Newarker. In 1960, the "Stagehand Strike" occurred by the Stagehands Local Union 21 picketing in front of the theatre during the live stage attractions of Redd Foxx, The Miracles with Smokey Robinson, Shep and the Limelights, Chuck Jackson and others lined up. The "Lyric Theatre" was shown nearby as not involved in this lockout (industry) by stagehand employees. Additionally, the "Adams Theatre," also owned by the Adams Brothers, was picketed during a movie showing or stage shows by the stagehands union. Indicated 1,966 seats capacity.	Closed March 31, 1986, operated as a store until 2011. Dilapidated state of repairs
Court	16 West Market Street	1910	800	Independent Theater Service Inc.	mid 1950s	Theatre for African-American's during the 1940s to 1950s. Breintnall Place. Indicated 786 seats.	Demolished in mid 1950s for the Essex County Courthouse.
Elwood	642 Broadway and Elwood corner	1931	1,270	Eastern Theatres Circuit	?	Started in 1931. Operational during the 1950s for second-run double featured films Here Come the Girls (1953 film) and Fighter Attack. Also, operational in 1959 for Don't Give up the Ship and Tarzan's Greatest Adventure Purchased by Eastern Theatres Circuit and renovated in 1959. In 1964, presented movies such as, Man's Favorite Sport and Dark Purpose with matinees dedicated for children with a K. Gordon Murray dubbed English version, Puss in Boots (1961 film) featured a live costume character present at the theatre. Indicated by Eddie Steinberg as owner and operator between mid 1950s to 1968. During the 1970s, The theatre "Teatro Caribe" which was previously known as "Cameo Theatre" location on Elizabeth Avenue moved and became known as the "New Caribe Elwood" with Spanish language films, such as Las Mil y Unas Noches until closure in late 1970s.?	Demolished and became a fast food business
Newsreel Theatre	800 Broad Street	1938	?	Newsreel Theatres, Inc.	1960s	Architect John Eberson designed the theatre. Featured, one hour news from Universal, RKO-Pathe, Paramount, News of the Day, and Fox Movietone News until closure from television news media sources dominated. Was known as the "Guild Theatre" prior.	Closed 1960s and ground level was used for retail until demolished location.
Luxor	264 Market Street	1950s	?	?	1960s	Movie theatre of mostly Polish foreign language films during late 1950s and then pornographic films in the 1960s as the theatre names was, "Luxor Follies."	Demolished for office building
Capitol Theatre	120 Market Street	1914	1,250	Stanley-Warner, Warner Bros	mid 1950s	Originally known as the Strand Theatre since May 1, 1914. Renamed to Capital Theatre prior to 1926. Was associated with the larger Branford Theatre under Warner Bros for capacity of moviegoers from there. The theatre was nearest the "RKO Proctor's Theatre" and boomed in viewers from their closure.	Closed and became a store.
Crystal Theatre	282 Washington Street	1914	seats	?	1926	?	Demolished and open parking lot
Rivoli Theater	208 Ferry Street	1920	1,200	?	1960s	Started serving the Polish and German community with films.	Closed and is a furniture showroom
Ironbound Theater	172 Ferry Street	1921	1,200	?	1957s	Operated as "Pic Theatre" from October 16, 1946, up to 1951 and reverted to Ironbound naming some time after 1957 listings as a theatre.	Closed and had retail or other business such as a bakery
Cameo	81 Elizabeth Avenue	1950s	966	?	1972	In 1950s had live theatre after being a movie house. Indicated by Eddie Steinberg as owner and operator briefly in early 1950s. Became "Teatro Caribe", with Spanish films until 1972	Church
Grand Opera House	399-401 Washington Street and Marshall Streets	1872	1800	?	1916	Built 1872 and opened on October 5, 1872, as the "Industrial Institute Hall." Name changes to "Grand Opera House," "Columbia Theatre," "Jacob's Theatre," and in 1916, "Family Theatre." In 1886, the "Columbia Theatre" was used for vaudeville performances. Changes from 2,400 to 1,800 in seats were done in a remodeling for motion pictures under "Jacob's Theatre." A 1916 inspection revealed an unsafe building and required to close. Theatre was built originally as a skating rink.	Closed December 6, 1916. Demolished.
Washington Theatre	Market Street near Washington Street	1897	?	Fox	?	First Newark movie house. Under control of William Fox (producer)	?
Kenney's	30 Branford Place and Halsey Street	1912	2,100	?	?	"New York Times" published the announcement on September 12, 1912, that Levi Weingarten was planning Newark's largest theater for Corse Payton with a $25,500 10-year lease. Would be known as "Payton Corse Theatre" and with the same location address later as the "Schubert Theatre."	?
Goodwin	859-863 Broad Street	1913	761	Stanley-Fabian, Warner Bros.	1950s	Was considered part of the Stanley-Fabian circuit, along with fellow theaters: "Branford," "Capital," "Mosque," and "Rialto." Became known as "Globe Theatre" with 750 seats in 1941 with Warner Brothers Circuit Management Corporation. Was only full-time art theater for many years until converted to retailing in the 1950s.	Closed, undetermined if demolished officially. Location has a three level retail store and a few stores alongside.
Orpheum Theater	385 Washington St	1911	1,693	?	?	Theatre, Morris L. Selesinger had it built. Indicated largest amusement house in a New York Times announcement when sold to Samuel Katz in 1912.	?
Cameo Twin Cinema XXX	68 Orange Street	1924	?	?	2010	Known as the "Treat Theatre" until 1957s. In the 1980s, began showing pornographic movies and closed due to a murder	Demolished June 2012 for a parking lot
Little Theatre	562 Broad Street	1928	299	?	2018	German art and foreign films during the 1950s until 1970s. Pornographic films in the 1980s with two screens.	Closed, still for lease
Avon Theatre	459 Clinton Avenue	1926	980	Fox Circuit	1968	Known as "American Theatre" before 1940. Community films were for African-Americans. Indicated by Eddie Steinberg as owner and operator between mid 1950s to 1968. Showed double features with three movies changes per week during Steinberg ownership. Business growth when "National Theatre" closed nearby Belmont Avenue.	Demolished
Ritz Theatre	409 Springfield Avenue	1926	1,993	Warner Bros	1956	Operated by Joseph Stern and used the Western Electric sound systems equipment for 1929.	Demolished and location became a parking lot of a national hardware store
Stanley Theatre	983 S. Orange Avenue	1927	1,969	Stanley-Warner, Warner Bros.	late 1950s	Became known as an Italian-American cultural organization called "Casa Italiana." Later in the 1980s, owners were the "Newark Gospel Tabernacle."	Church and building for sale
Hawthorne Theatre	396 Hawthorne Avenue	1925	1,052	Stanley-Warner, Warner Bros.	mid 1950s	Organ was installed by 1925	grade school
Newark Opera House	Court Street and Washington Street	?	1,589	?	?	Theatre was founded by Alfredo Cerrigone and general manager, for the audiences in the Italian-American Community. The Newark Repertoire Company presented the popular running New York City, Stage Door (play) created in 1936 by George S. Kaufman and Edna Ferber. The Theater in 1940 presented Broadway musicals, concerts, and operas. One opera featured singer Carlo Buti that year. The Newark Opera Playhouse playbill, indicated John Clein's "Crescendo!" would play for a week on Monday, February 4 (1946) with renowned performers, Ralph Morgan and Nance O'Neil. Further opera stars, Soprano Hilda Reggiani and Tenor Bruno Landi (tenor) were guests from the Metropolitan Opera House of New York City for the March 10–31, 1946 presentations of composer Gaetano Donizetti's "Lucia di Lammermoor." The Jack Kirkland presentation of Tobacco Road (play) starred John Barton at this venue.	Closed and presumed demolished as a former Star-Ledger newspaper buildings location
Bellevue	80 Belleville Avenue	1914	800	?	1915s	Designed by Nathan Myers. Opened Spring 1914 as a photoplay house then was vaudeville.	Closed, Demolished, street is Broadway
Bergen	328 Bergen Street	pre-1926	1,000	?	post-1935	?	Closed, demolished, a parking lot
Central	505 Central Avenue near 8th Street	pre-1925	1,293	Warner Bros	post-1956.	?	Closed, church
Clinton Square	233 Clinton Avenue	1915	600	?	1928	?	Closed, demolished, housing
Colonial	148 Summer Avenue	1925	800	?	1934	Possible known as "Elite Theatre" at the corner of Summer Ave & Bloomfield Ave for 1914.	Closed, demolished, location is a gas station.
Congress	257 South Orange Avenue	1925?	600	?	1951?	A Robert-Morton organ was installed in 1925. Was known as the "Victoria Theatre" for Italian vaudeville. Listed in the Film Daily Yearbook of 1951 as open.	Closed, school
De Luxe	404 South Orange Avenue	1913	600	?	1928	De Luxe Theatre. Indicated as the "Strand Theatre" from 1939 until 1942, when Eddie Steinberg owned and operated it as a community theater at the location of South Orange and 12th Street, before he served in WWII. The owner had his mother as the cashier and gave weekly dinner plates to patrons at Tuesday showings up to a year to complete a set.	Closed, building erect as church
Essex Theater	100 Springfield Ave	?	1,100	?	?	Design by William E. Lehman. George Burns and Gracie Allen played here in 1922 when it was known as the "Hill Theatre."	?
Grand	647 Springfield Avenue	1926	600	?	1929	?	Closed, Demolished, vacant lot
Hill	100 Springfield Avenue	1913	1,200	?	1928	Architect plans by Nathan Myers. George Burns and Gracie Allen first performance in vaudeville.	Closed, demolished and is a park
Ideal	425 Broad Street	pre-1914	?	?	1926	?	Closed, undetermined building
Kent	856 Mount Prospect Avenue	pre-1943	391	?	post-1960	Became a trampoline center circa 1960–1961.	Closed, church
Lincoln	525 South Orange Ave	1926	600	?	pre-1929	?	Closed, demolish, empty lot.
Lyceum	229 Springfield Avenue	1913	1,200	Universal-Jewel	1938?	Architects: Nathan Myers.	?
Mayfair	1011 S. Orange Avenue	1929	1,201	Liggett-Florin Booking Service, Warner Bros. Circuit Management Corp.	1950s	Liggett in 1957 and shortly Warner for closure as planned for larger "Stanley theatre" nearby.	Closed, bowling alley and currently retail
Mindlin's Playhouse	982 Broad Street	1930	420	?	post-1932	Opened April 19, 1930 and listed in 1932 as "Carlton Theatre."	Closed, building used by Newark Emergency Services For Families
Mount Prospect	675 Mount Prospect Avenue	pre 1926	1,100	?	pre 1935	?	Closed, retail
Park	1025 Bergen Street	1920s	1,000	?	1970s	"Bergen Theatre" "Weequahic Theatre"	Closed, Funeral Home
Plaza Theatre	400 Springfield Avenue	1916	750	?	1929	There was a Plaza Theater at 129 North 7th Street.	Closed
Plaza Theater	129 N. 7th Street	1915s	1,133	Brandt Theaters	1960s	There was another Plaza Theatre at the 400 Springfield Avenue location. Erected by Edward W. McDonough in 1915 for $100,000. The theater was an Art Deco style building built by architect, Henry Baechlin. Owned by Madelaine Kridel during the Newark Riots. The closure of the theatre occurred late 1960s after the Riots.	Closed, various English and Spanish churches
Regent Theater	8 Bloomfield Avenue	1925	1,840	Stanley-Warner Theatres, Warner Bros. Circuit Management Corp.	1951s	Joseph Stern management	Closed, Demolished
Ronson	South Orange Avenue and Littleton Avenue	?	1,100	?	1939	Built and owned by Louis Vincent Aronson. Midweek movies and weekend vaudeville shows with some Black entertainers. In 1939, briefly managed by Eddie Steinberg, operator of various community theaters.	Closed in 1939.
Roosevelt	796 Clinton Avenue	1926	1,714	Stanley-Warner Theatres, Warner Bros. Circuit Management Corp.	1950s		Closed, building standing as a church
Savoy	101 Springfield Avenue	1922	1,586	Warner Bros. Circuit Management Corp.	1950s	Listed as a Negro Theater in the 1951 Film Daily Yearbook.	Demolished
Tivoli Theater	545 Orange Street	1920s	1,861	Stanley-Warner, Warner Bros., Circuit Management Corp.	1960s	Silent movies such as Circus Days with Jackie Coogan in 1923 and known as the "Stern's Tivoli Theatre" upon this showing. Operated by Joseph Stern in 1925. In April 1953, the first 3D Natural Vision color movie, Bwana Devil was shown along with the U.S. release of The Thief of Venice.	Demolished late 1970s
West End	300 16th Avenue	1920s	925	Independent Theater Service, Inc.	1960s	Operated by multiple theater owner, Eddie Steinberg in the 50s and 60s. Showing double features and two or three movie changes per week. A showing of Elvis Presley's Love Me Tender (1956 film) had thousands of patrons lined outside for the under capacity seating of 800, according to Steinberg.	Closed, demolished, house built
Newark Moonlight Cinema	220 Orange Street	2021	cars	?	2021	A drive-in theater implemented after the COVID-19 pandemic era for showing African-American filmmakers movies. Operated July 24, 2021 until October 31, 2021. Theater idea developed by filmmaker, Ayana Stafford-Morris and her real estate developer husband, Siree Morris.	Closed, continued as the razed lot of the former Newark Bears Baseball Stadium

== Images ==
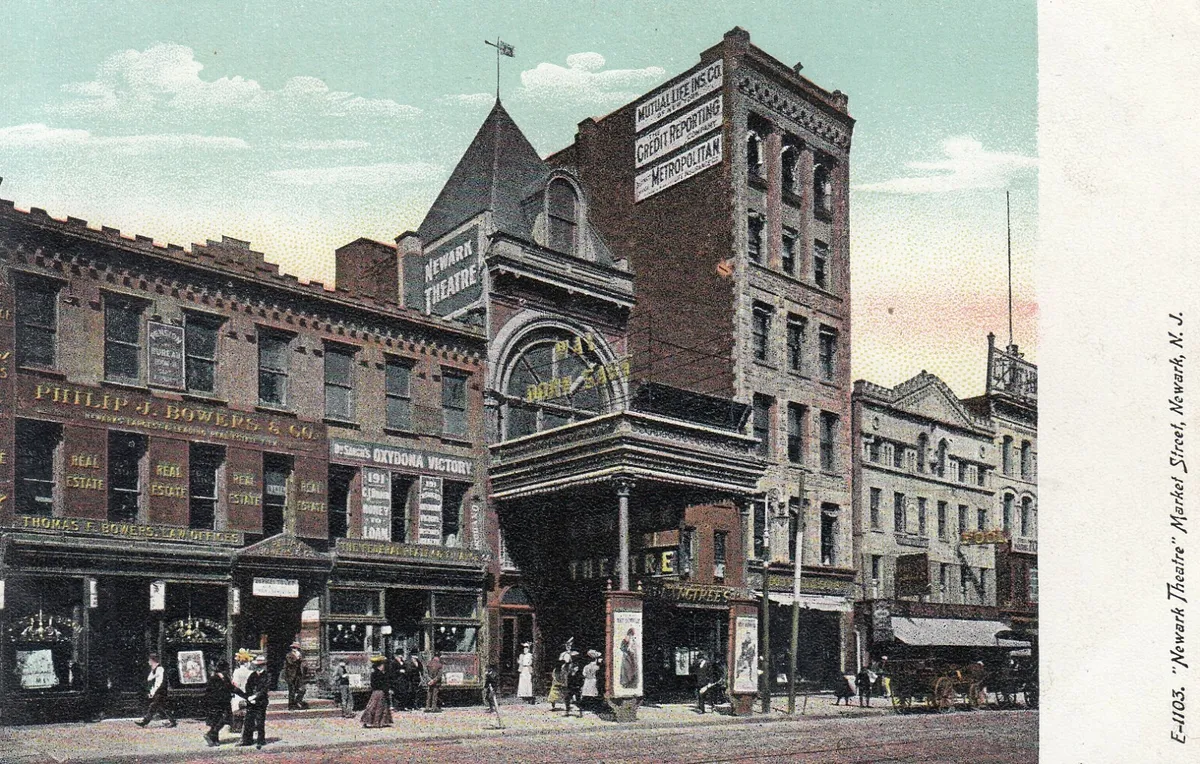
The Newark Theatre in 1906. Was Miner's Theatre in 1886 when began and was Paramount Theatre in 1986 when closed

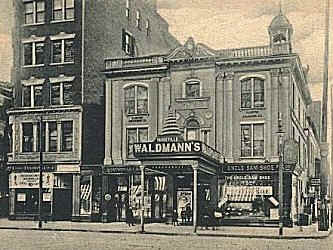
Waller's Opera House opened in 1847 and became Waldmann's Opera House. Was later known as Fox's Carlton Theatre, Gayety Theatre, and finally known as Ascher's Halsey Theatre until 1922.

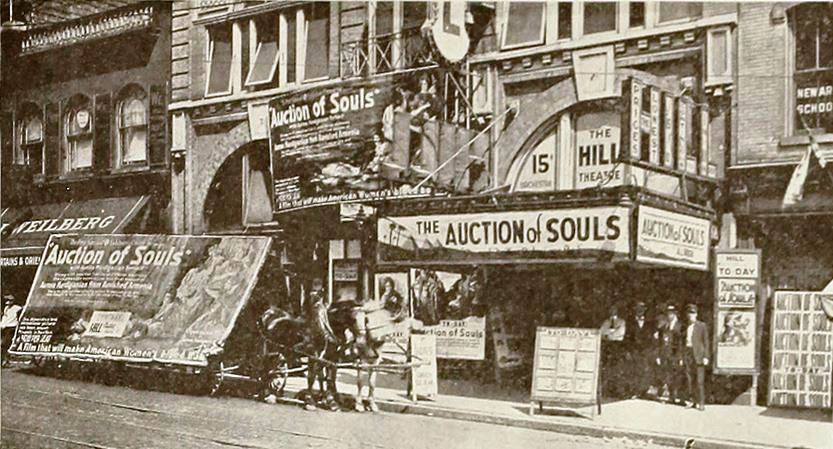
The Hill Theatre presented Auction of Souls in 1919. Located on Springfield Ave and presented the first performance of George Burns and Gracie Allen. Later became known as the Essex Theater and demolished after the Newark Riots of 1967

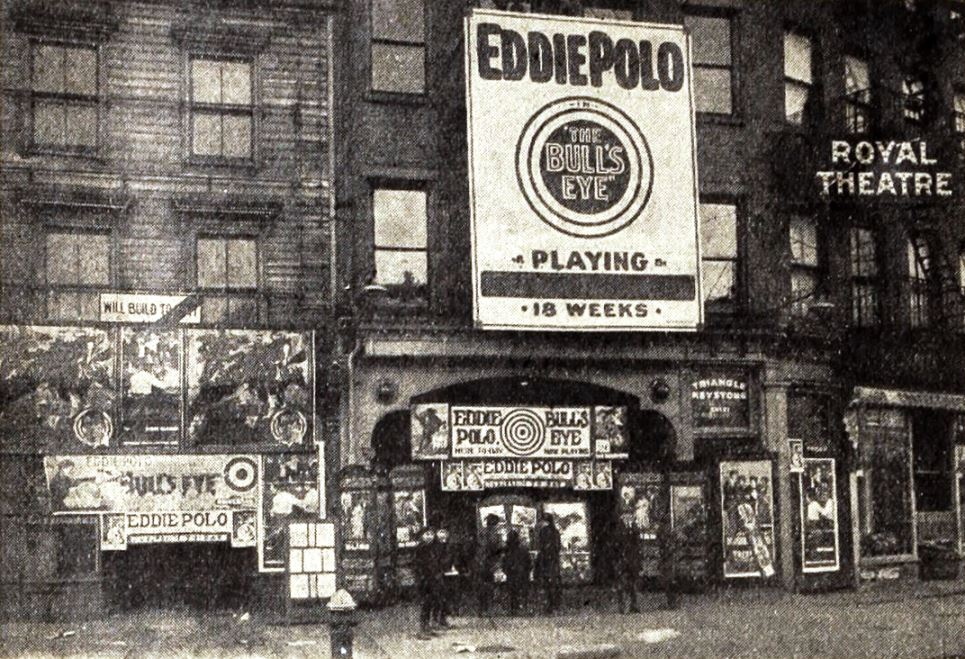
Royal Theatre showing the serial called, The Bull's Eye (serial) (1918)

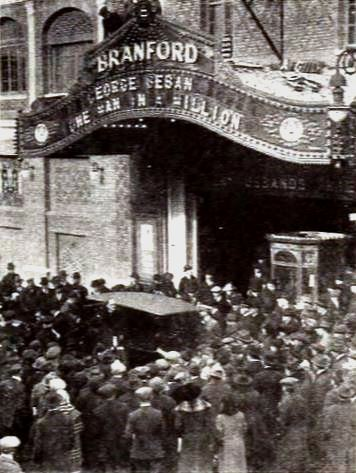
Branford Theatre showing One Man in a Million in 1921 with silent film actor, George Beban present

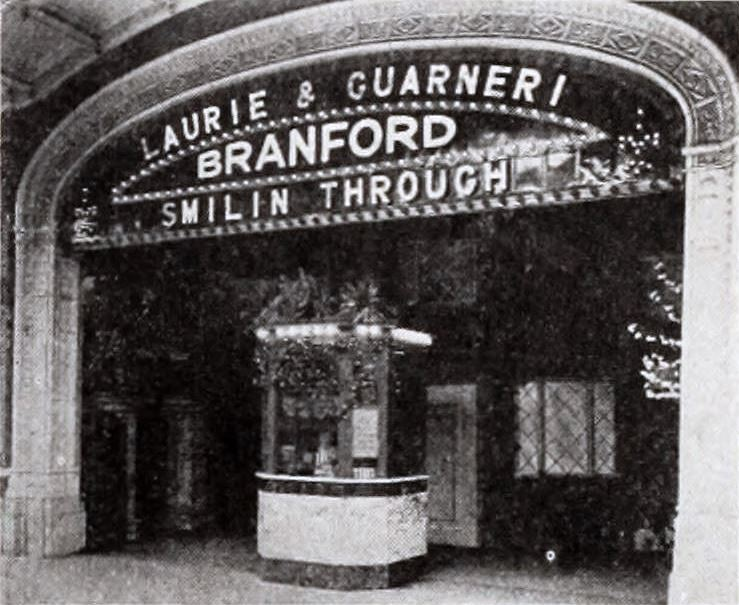
The Branford Theatre showing Smilin' Through (1922 film) (1922)

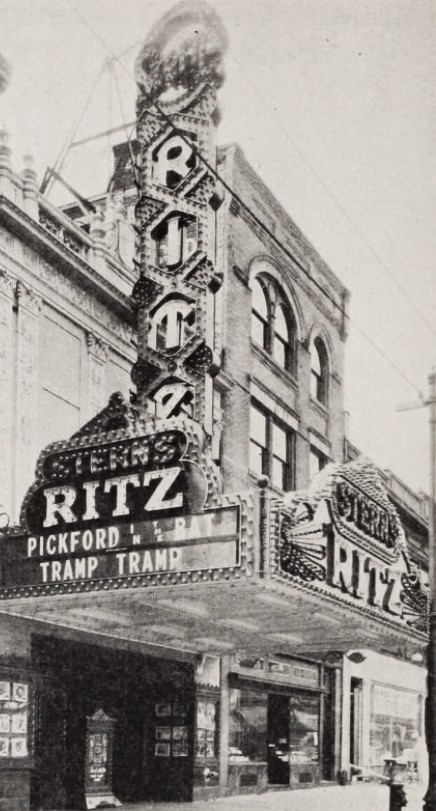
The Ritz Theatre owned by Joseph Stern in 1926, showed The Bat (1926 film) and Tramp, Tramp, Tramp.

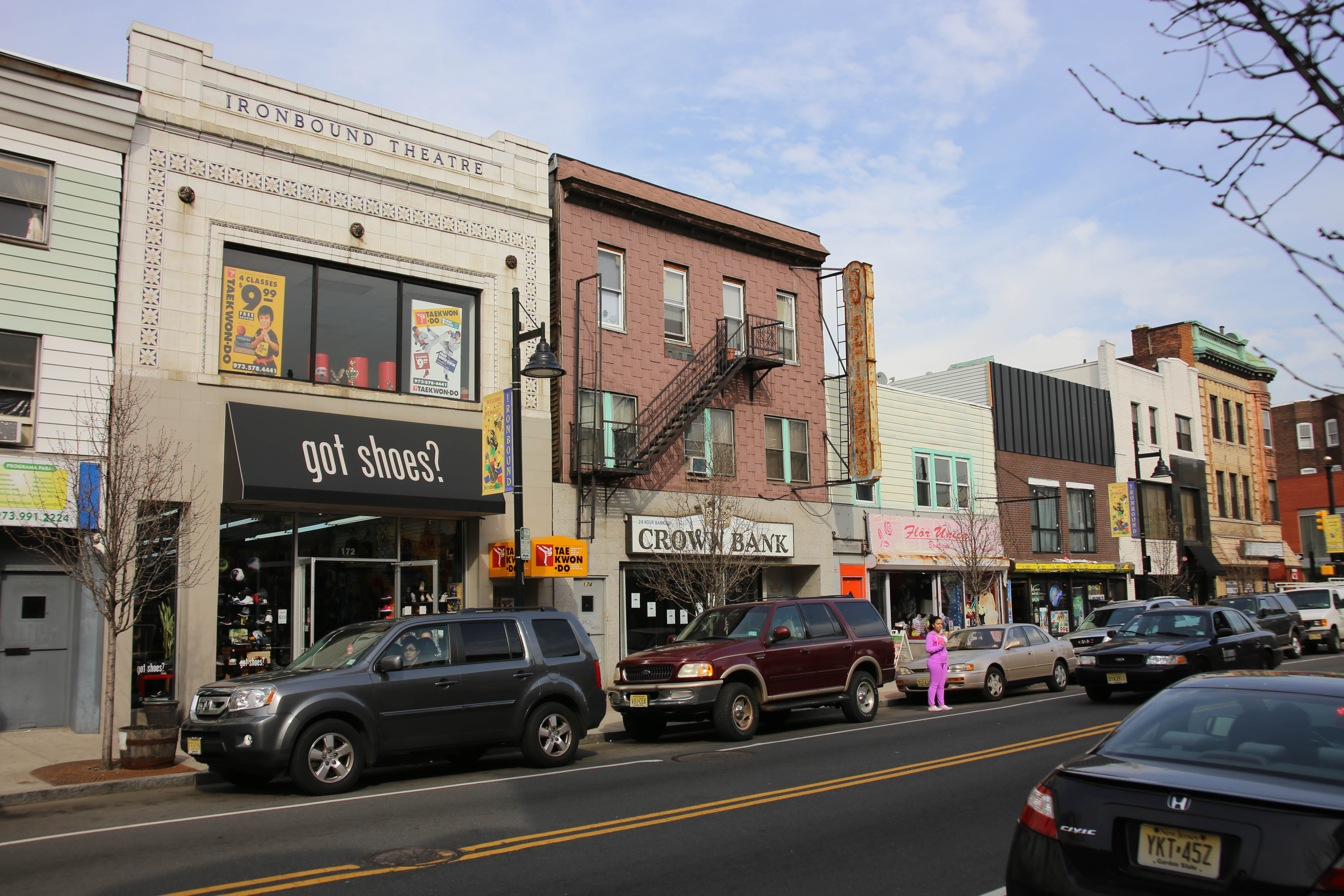
The Ironbound Theatre currently shows shoes in a retail store.

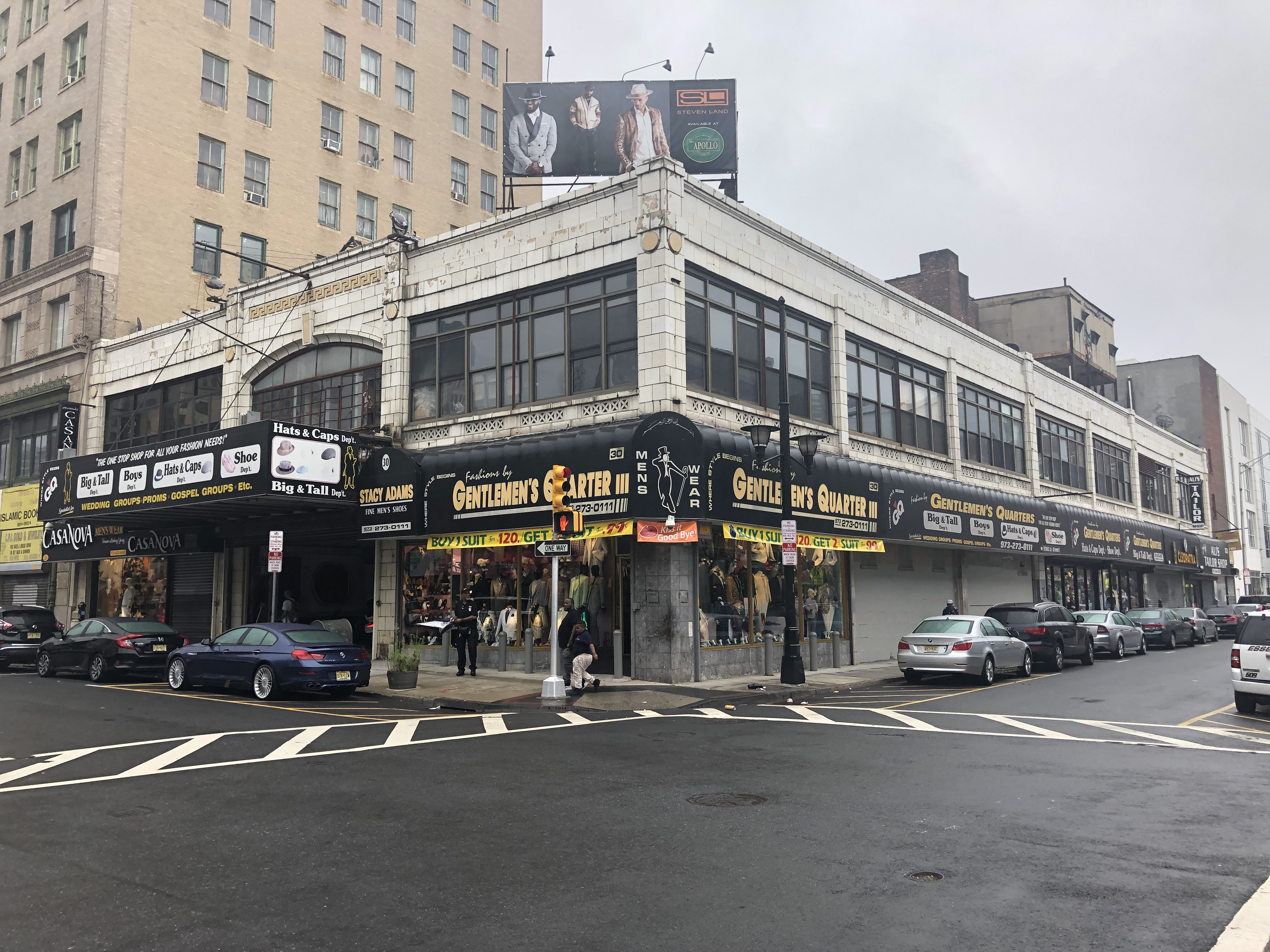
The Adams Theatre was popular for live shows of the stars of the time. Closed in 1986.

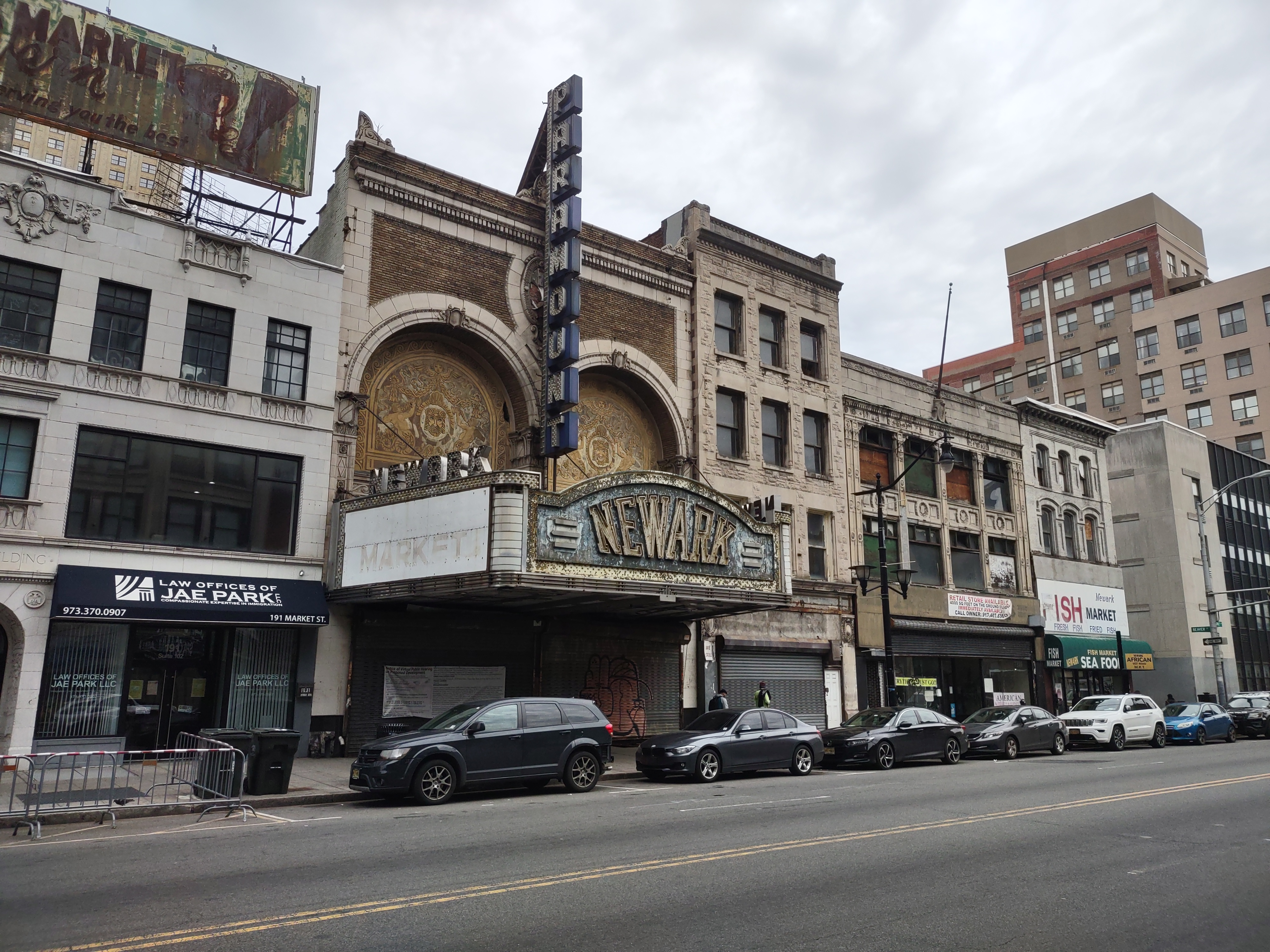
Paramount Theatre opened as Miner's Newark Theatre in 1886.

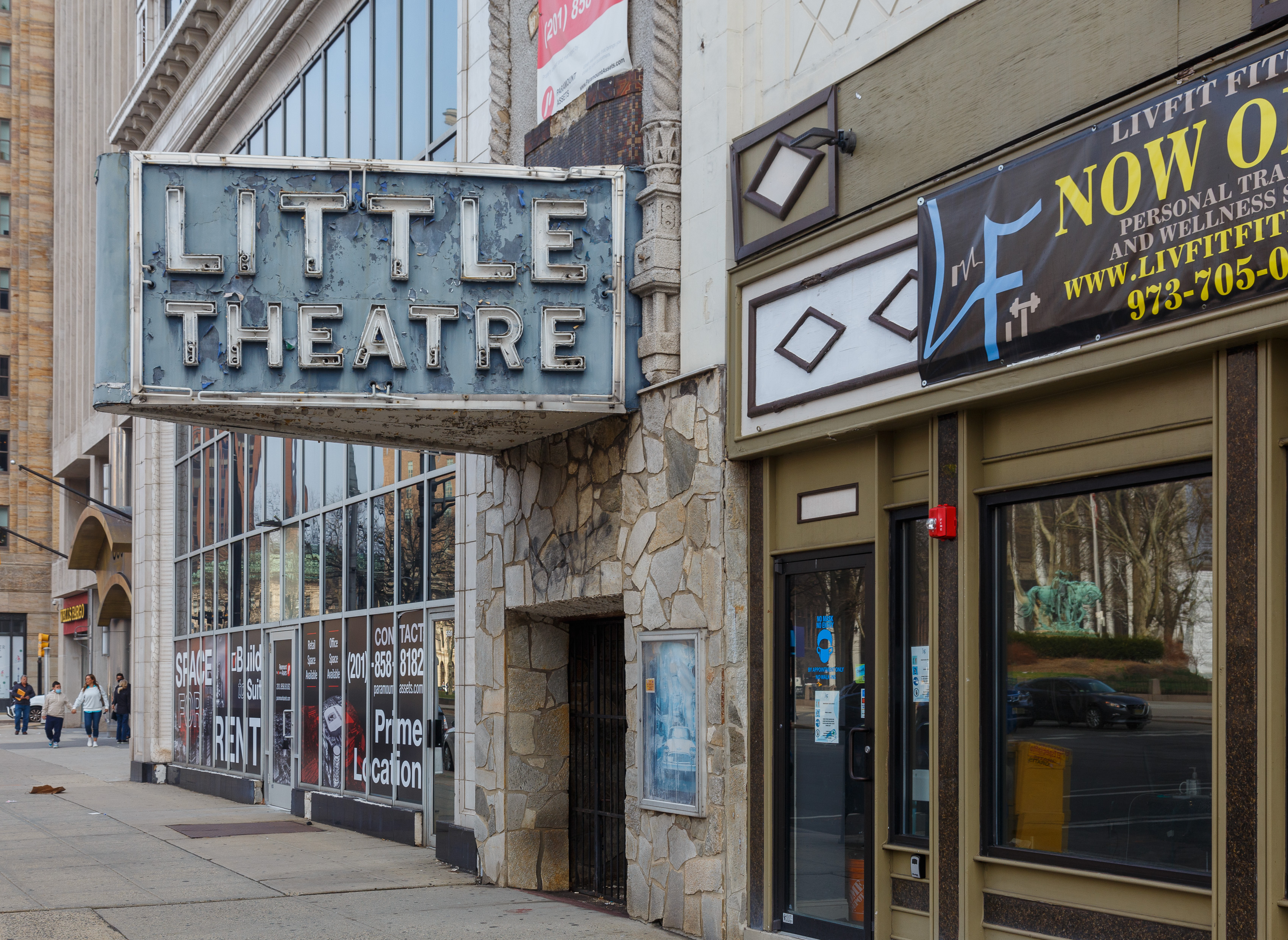
The Little Theatre was an art and foreign film movie house that became a pornographic cinema theatre with two screens and 299 seat capacity.

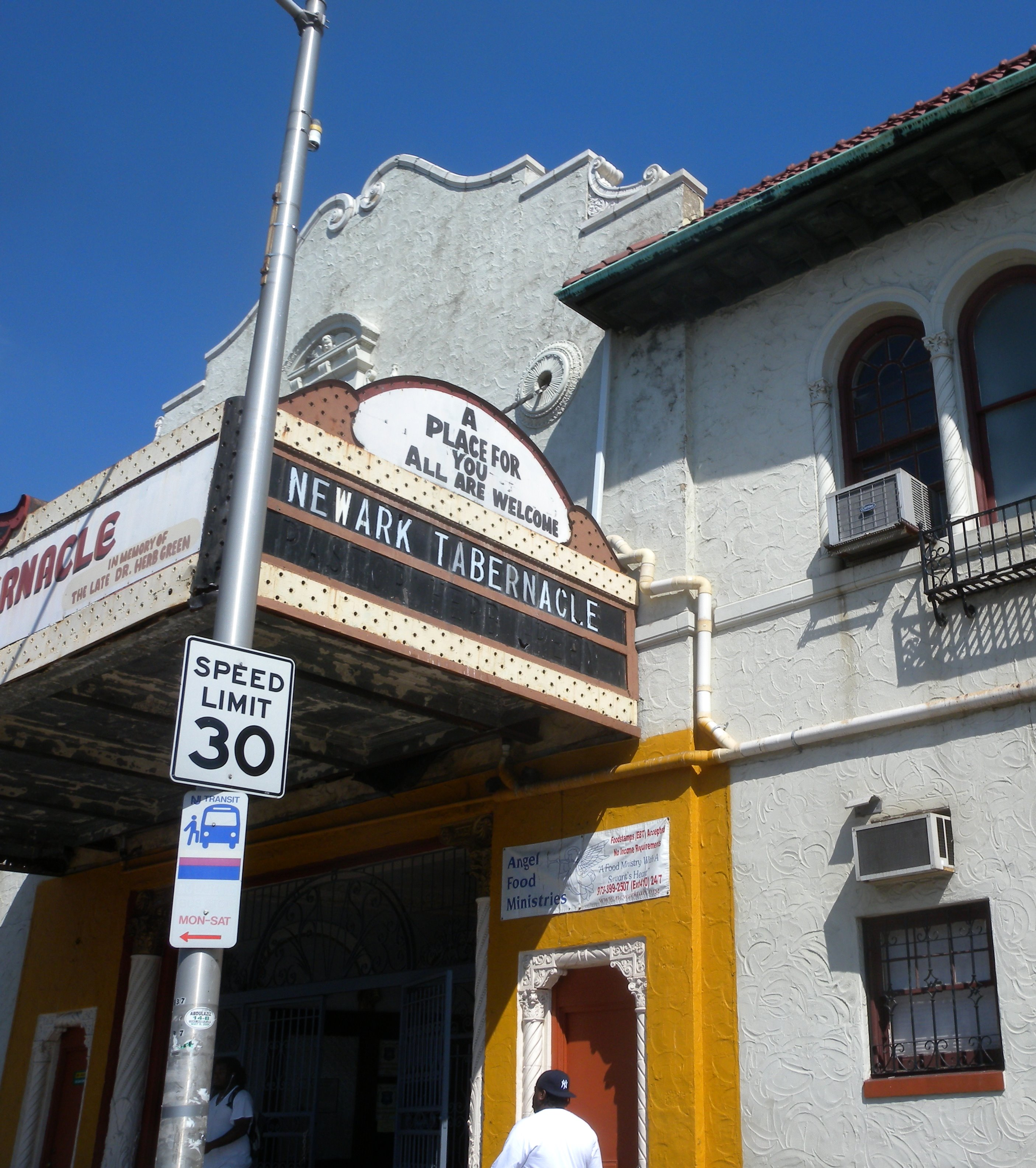
Stanley Theatre became Casa Italiana. A church called Newark Tabernacle is the current owner.

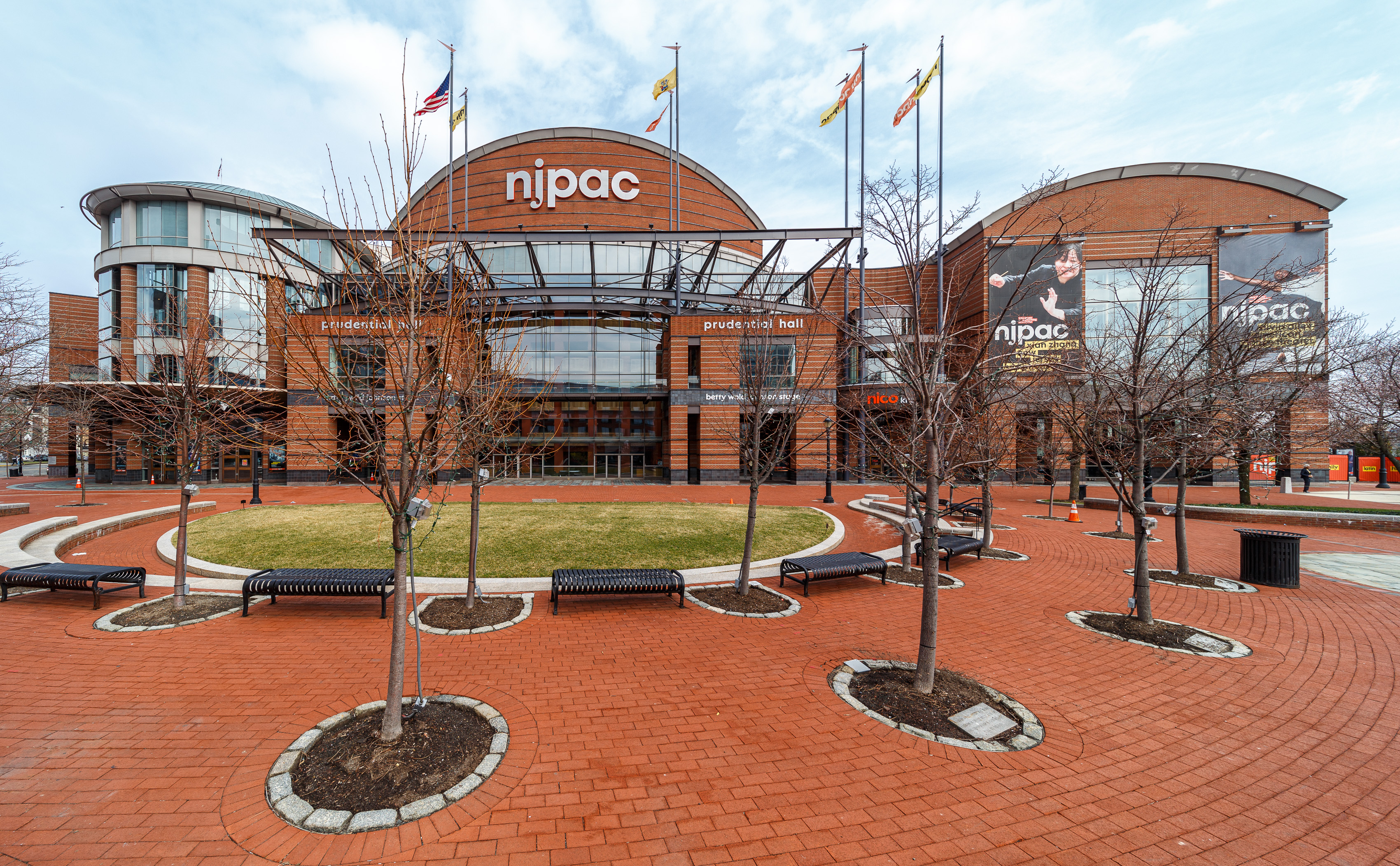
NJPAC at One Center Street

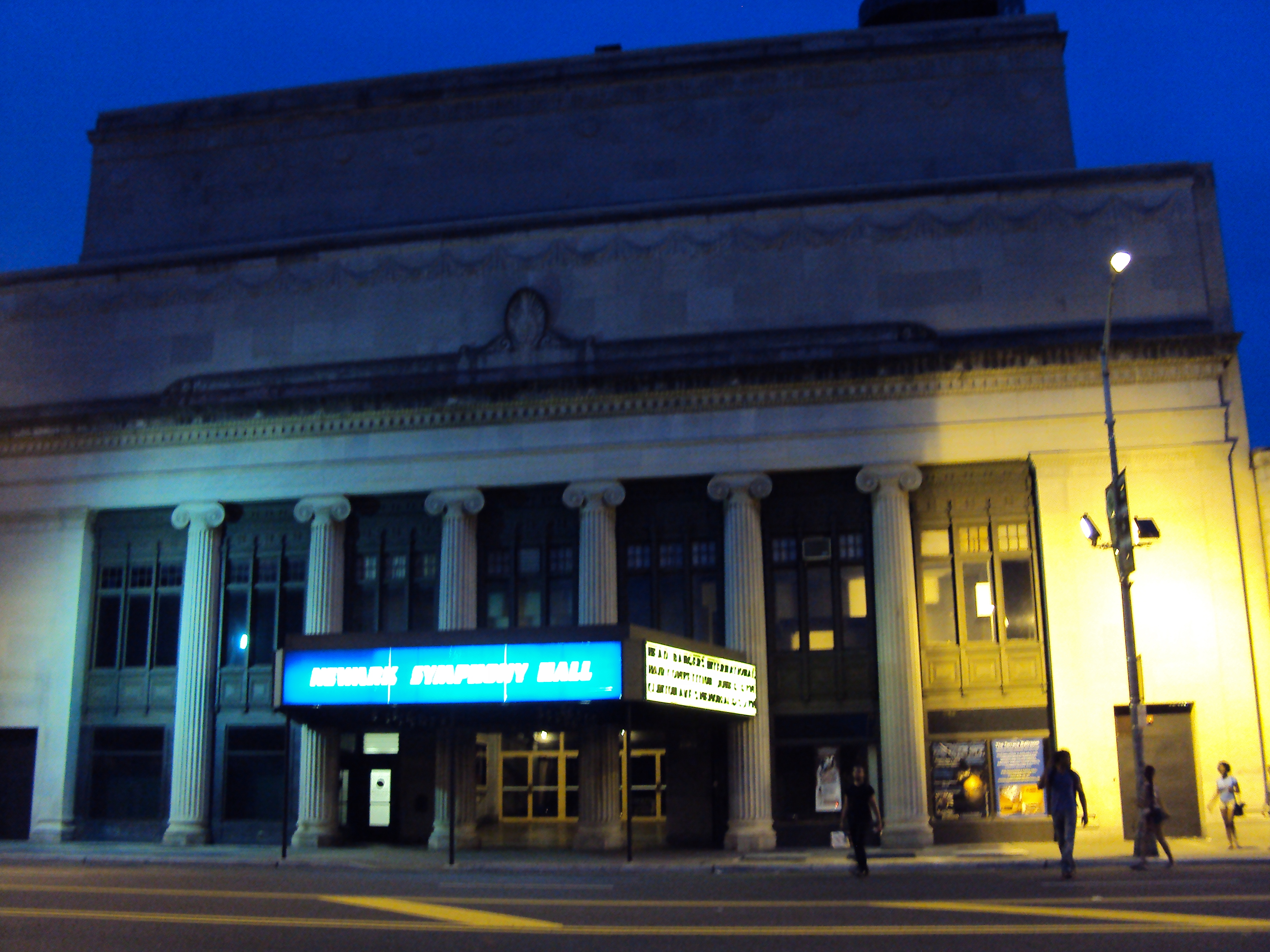
Newark Symphony is operational. Known previously as the Salaam Temple, Mosque Theatre, and Newark Boys Choir

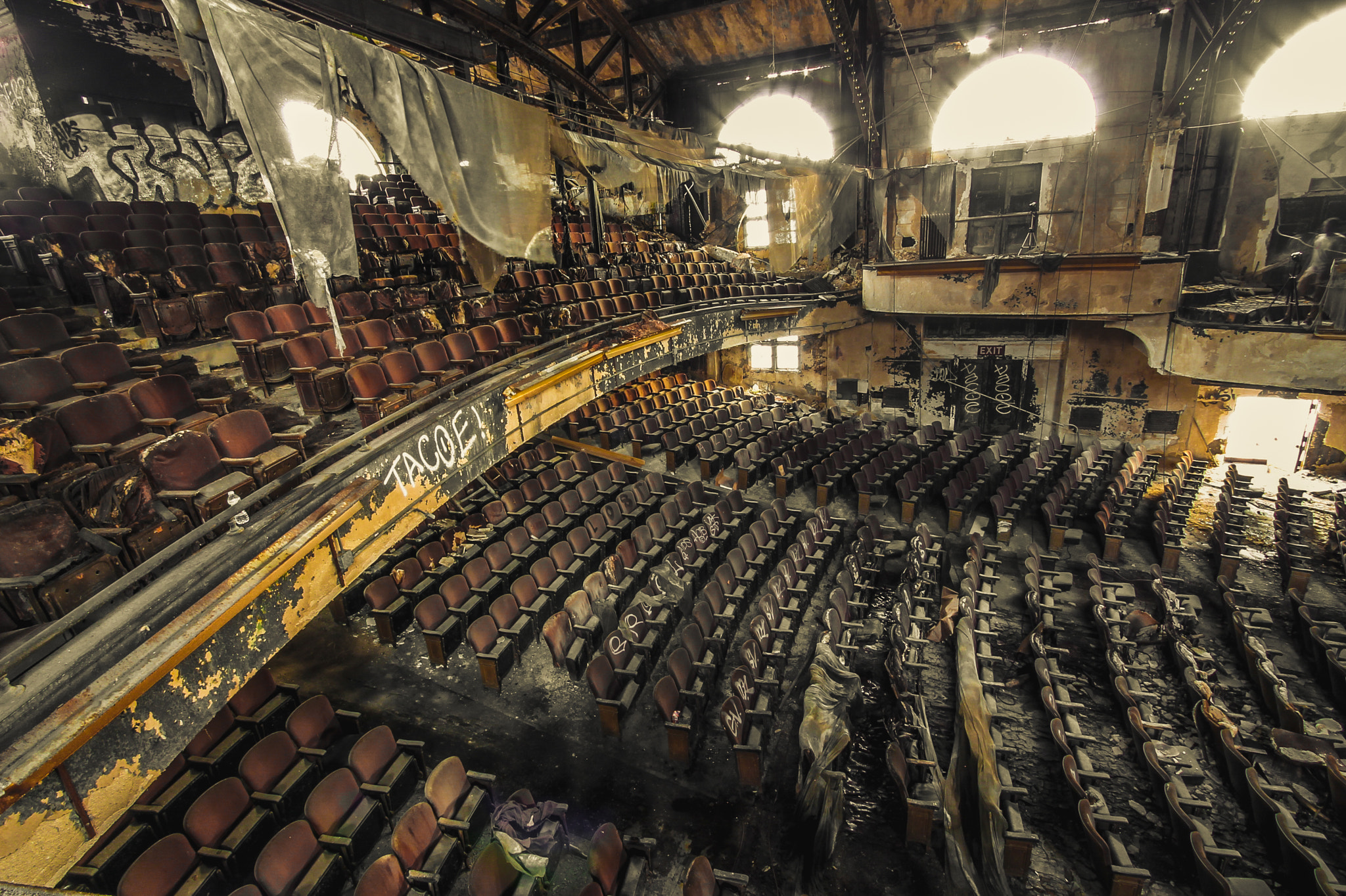
The RKO Proctor's Rooftop Theatre closed in 1968. Image from 2014.

== Videos ==
- Adams Theatre in 1960 stagehand lockout, featured at 7:05 to 8:08 minute of film
- Branford Theatre during the early years of silent film era
- Paramount Theatre in 1960 stagehand lockout, featured throughout, except for 7:05 thru 8:08 as shown the Adams Theatre
- RKO Proctor's Rooftop Theatre and Penthouse Cinema shown in 2022
- Newark Moonlight Cinema debut in 2021
