= Caroline Keating Reed =

American pianist and music teacher

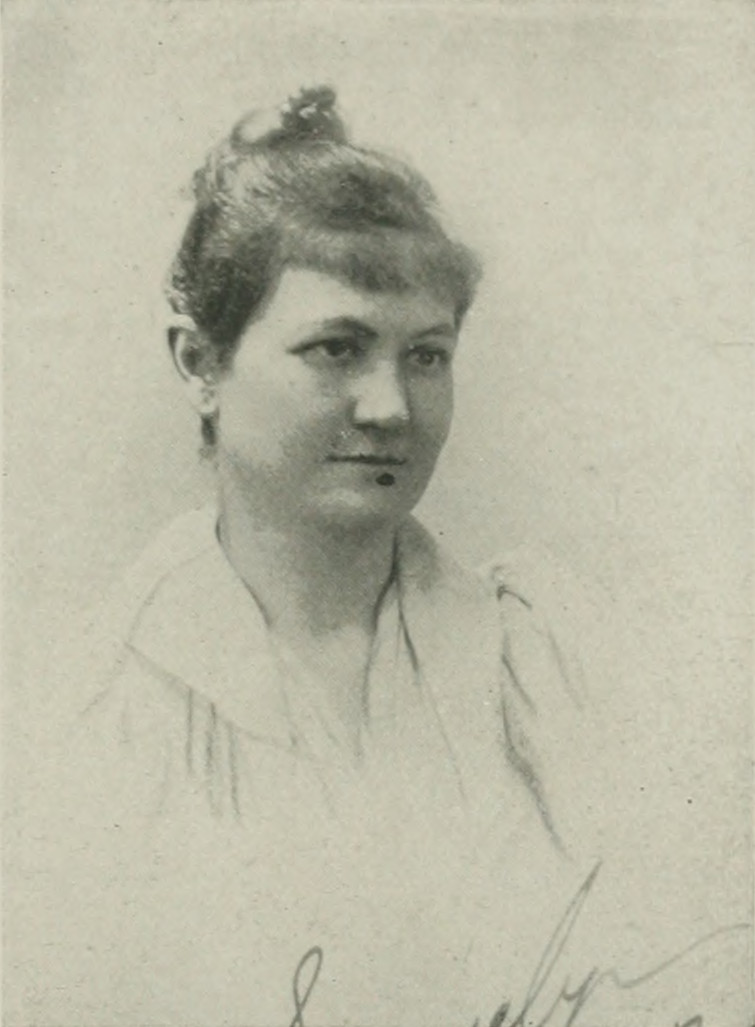
- "A Woman of the Century"

Background information
- Born: Caroline Morton Keating; Nashville, Tennessee, U.S.
- Died: March 9, 1954
- Occupations: pianist; music teacher
- Instruments: piano
- Spouse: William Gordon Reed (m. 1891)

Caroline Keating Reed (née, Keating; died March 9, 1954) was an American pianist and music teacher. In 1903, she published Rudiments and technique for the piano.

== Early life and education ==
Caroline (nickname, "Carrie") Morton Keating was born in Nashville, Tennessee, and reared and educated in Memphis, Tennessee where her father, Col. John McLeod Keating, was the half owner and managing editor of the Appeal. In 1856, he married Josephine Esselman Smith. They had two children, Caroline, and Neil McLeod Keating.

Early in her childhood, Reed displayed her fondness for music, in which art her mother was proficient, the leading amateur singer in the city, a pianist and harpist. As soon as Reed could comprehend the value of notes and lay hold of the simplest exercises, her mother began to train her. She became the pupil of a local teacher, Emile Levy, and went forward very rapidly. Her parents determined that her earnestness should be seconded by the very best teachers in the U.S., and Reed was sent in 1877 to New York City, where, under Sebastian Bach Mills, she made great progress, but still more under Madame Teresa Carreño . She also took lessons from the pianist, Mrs. Agnes Morgan. She subsequently studied under Richard Hoffman and under Rafael Joseffy. She studied harmony and thorough bass with Mr. Nichols. To those lessons she added later on the study of ensemble music as a preparation for orchestral works, under the guidance of leading members of the New York Philharmonic Club. During the two last years of her stay in New York, she played in several concerts in that city and its vicinity. As an artist, she was recognized by the musicians of New York and the musical critics of the press. In January 1884, she returned home.

Before entering upon her successful professional career, she gave several concerts in Memphis and surrounding cities. The following year, she became a regular teacher of the piano-forte and singing, having been fitted for the latter branch of her art by three years of study under Achille Errani.

She was very practical in her philanthropy, and since first forming her class, which always averaged forty pupils, she was never without one or more whom she taught free of charge. For two or three years she gave lessons gratuitously to six pupils, who were unable to pay anything. She has contributed frequently to charitable purposes, either by concerts or with her earnings.

Since her marriage in 1891, she continued to teach. She also prepared a primer on technique for beginners.

Reed held progressive views of life, especially those concerning women and women's work. As a child, she was wont to declare her determination to earn her living when she grew up. She thus set herself apart from the traditional roles for women at that time. Devoted to her art and her vocation as a teacher, she stood out as one the best instructors of music in the country, and held her students to the same high standards she set for herself.

== Personal life ==
In 1891, she married William Gordon Reed Sr. They had one child, a son, William Gordon Reed Jr.

Caroline Morton Keating Reed died March 9, 1954, and is buried at Forest Hills Cemetery and Crematory, Jamaica Plain, Massachusetts.

== Selected works ==
- Rudiments and technique for the piano, 1903
