= Achille Errani =

Italian opera singer (1823–1897)

Achille Errani (20 August 1823 – 6 January 1897) was an Italian opera singer and teacher.

== Early life ==
Errani was born in Faenza, Italy. When seventeen years of age he entered the Milan Conservatory, and studied singing under the famous Vaccai. About five years later he made his first appearance as a leading tenor at Reggio di Modena.

== Career ==
In 1859, after singing often in Italy, Spain, and Greece, he went to Havana under the management of Max Maretzek. He came to New York City in 1860, sang at the Winter Garden with Fabbri, Gazia, and Frezzolini, and in 1861, when Adelina Patti sang Violetta in Traviata for the first time, he took the part of Alfredo. He went to Mexico in 1863, and after the Civil War joined Max Strakosch's Ghioni & Susini Italian Opera Company. In 1865, he retired from the stage, settled in New York and became a voice teacher.

Among his students were Minnie Hauk, Nancy McIntosh, Stella Bonheur, Anna Mooney Burch, Caroline Keating Reed, Cornelia Townsend, and Emma Thursby (who was also in Strakosch's company).

== Death ==
Errani died on 6 January 1897, aged 73, in New York City.
