= Adolf Neuendorff =

American classical composer (1843–1897)

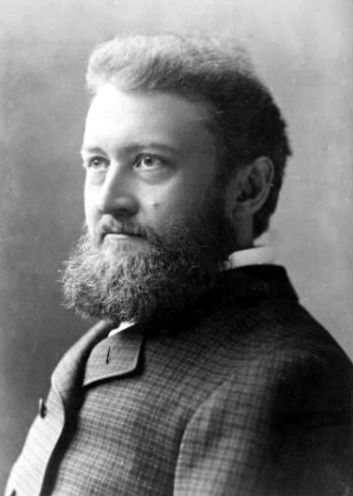
Adolf Neuendorff in 1884

Adolf Heinrich Anton Magnus Neuendorff (June 13, 1843 − December 4, 1897), also known as Adolph Neuendorff, was a German-American composer, violinist, pianist and conductor, stage director, and theater manager.

== Life ==
=== Early years ===
Born in Hamburg, Germany, Neuendorff emigrated with his father to New York City in 1855. In New York, he studied music, violin lessons with G. Matzka and Joseph Weinlich, and had lessons of piano, music theory and composition with Gustav Schilling. In 1859, he made his debut as a concert pianist at Dodworth Hall. In 1861, went on a tour around Brazil, playing the violin.

=== Milwaukee ===
In 1864, he returned to the United States, now living in Milwaukee, Wisconsin. Here he was conductor of the orchestra at the German Theatre and chorus-master of Karl Anschütz's German Opera Company. Later he succeeded Anschütz as conductor.

=== New York ===
In 1867, he became music-director of the Stadt Theater in New York. It was here where he conducted the American first performances of Richard Wagner's Lohengrin, on April 3, 1871, and Die Walküre, on April 2, 1877. In 1872, he brought Theodor Wachtel to the United States, and, with Carl Rosa, gave a season of Italian opera at the Academy of Music. In that same year, he also established the Germania Theatre in New York, of which he was manager for eleven years. During that time he was also organist of a church and conductor of a choral society. In 1875, he gave a season of German opera with Wachtel and Eugenie Pappenheim, conducted the Beethoven centennial concerts, and in 1876 he went to the first Wagner festival at Bayreuth as correspondent for the New Yorker Staats-Zeitung. In the 1878–79 season he conducted the New York Philharmonic Society in the absence of Theodore Thomas, who was away in Cincinnati. The first American performance of Brahms's 2nd Symphony was given by the Philharmonic Orchestra under Neuendorff's direction on October 3, 1878. On December 21, 1878, he conducted the same orchestra during the United States premiere of Tchaikovsky's Francesca da Rimini, Symphonic Fantasy after Dante. For the 1879/80 season, Thomas returned from Cincinnati to New York, and was elected conductor of the philharmonic well ahead of Neuendorff and Leopold Damrosch. Neuendorff began to compose comic operas and operettas, most of which were written to librettos in German as well as in English. Besides, he translated German operas into English to be performed on Broadway, for example Franz von Suppé's Die Afrikareise.

=== Boston ===
Between 1884 and 1889, he lived in Boston, Massachusetts, and on July 11, 1885, conducted the first promenade concert performed by the Boston Pops Orchestra at the Boston Music Hall. The first program included a novelty number titled An Evening with Bilse, which humorously tossed together scraps of Beethoven and Strauss, Wagner and Weber. Given that everything else on the program was European as well, the audience at the first promenade concert could not have imagined that it was launching a peculiarly American tradition.

=== Vienna ===
In 1889, he became the director of soprano Emma Juch's Grand Opera Company. Two years later, he moved to Vienna, Austria, with his wife, singer Georgine von Januschofsky, before returning to New York City where he died on December 4, 1897, aged 54.

=== Works ===
His compositions include two symphonies, operas, and numerous other instrumental and vocal works.

- The Rat-Charmer of Hamelin/Der Rattenfänger von Hameln (opera, 1880)
- Don Quixote (opera, 1882)
- Prince Waldmeister (opera, 1887)
- The Minstrel (opera, 1892)
