= Achille Rivarde =

American-born British violinist (1865–1940)

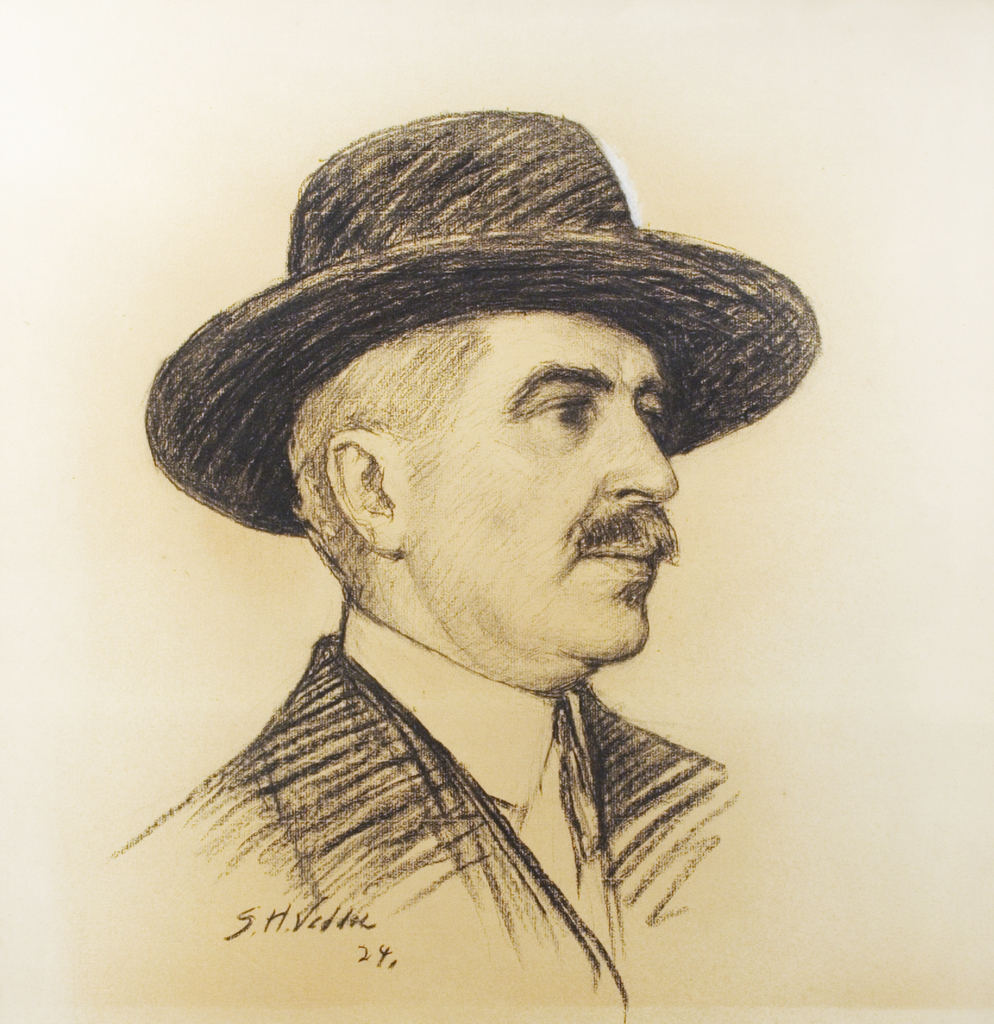
- Drawing by Simon Harmon Vedder, 1924
- Born: 31 October 1865; New York City, NY
- Died: 31 March 1940 (aged 74); London

Achille Rivarde (31 October 1865 – 31 March 1940) was an American-born British violinist and teacher, who worked mainly in Europe and London.

== Biography ==
Serge Achille Rivarde was born in New York City to a Spanish father and an American mother. He studied under Felix Simon, Henryk Wieniawski and José White Lafitte. At the age of eleven, he became a pupil of Charles Dancla at the Paris Conservatoire, sharing the first prize with František Ondříček in 1879.

He returned to America for three years 1881–84. In 1885, aged only 19, he returned to Paris to become principal violinist with the Orchestre Lamoureux. He remained in that post till 1891. In 1893, in Paris, he and Harold Bauer premiered Frederick Delius's Violin Sonata in B major.

He made his debut in London in 1894. In 1895 he gave Édouard Lalo's Symphonie espagnole its UK premiere.

His American debut came at Carnegie Hall in November 1895 (where he was described as "a Spanish violinist". He was also said to have "just entered his 28th year", but he was in fact 30). The New York Times critic said he "combines artistic sensibility with a lovely, fluent, polished execution", and also noted a resemblance to Pablo de Sarasate, both in his playing and his physical appearance. (A photograph of Rivarde can be seen here.) Some sources say he was also a pupil of Sarasate.

In 1899 he became a professor at the Royal College of Music. Apart from occasional appearances as a soloist in London and abroad (he shared the stage with Pablo Casals at a 1913 concert), he remained a teacher at the RCM till 1936 and was held in great esteem. Carl Flesch referred to him as "an important violinist and pedagogue". His pupils there included Anthony Collins, Eugene Goossens, the violinist and instrument valuer Robert Lewin, and Margaret Harrison (sister of Beatrice Harrison; she was aged only 4 when she entered the RCM to study with Rivarde). He was also the teacher of American soprano Anna Mooney Burch.

Eugene Goossens wrote a piece for violin and piano called Old Chinese Folk Song 'To Achille Rivarde, Esq.' Op. 4/1. Fritz Kreisler dedicated to Rivarde his transcription of Dvořák's 1st Slavonic Dance.

In 1922 Rivarde published The Violin and Its Technique As a Means to the Interpretation of Music, a small manual of his own method in which he advocated elasticity of movement in every bar. In 1924 he started a separate school of violin playing in London.

He died in 1940 in London, aged 74.
