= Frida Benneche =

American singer (1880–c.1943)

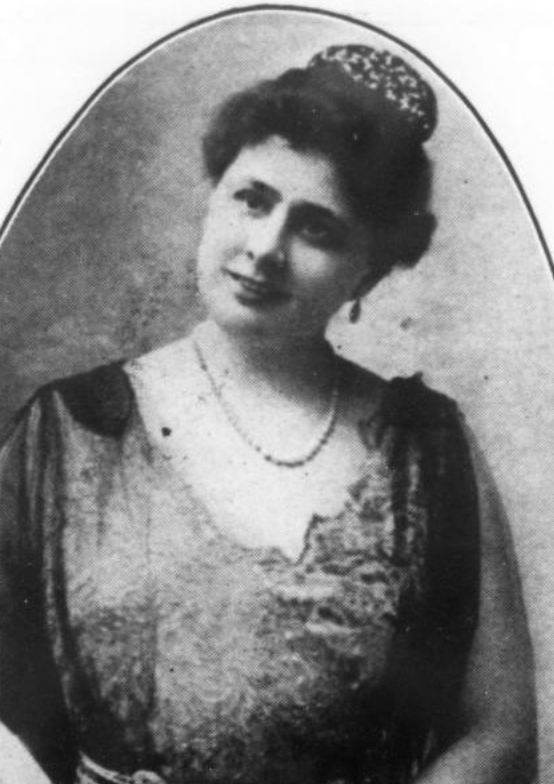
- Frida Benneche, from a 1917 publication
- Born: Frida Katherina Benneche; 10 June 1880; New York City
- Died: after 1943
- Other names: Freda Benneche, Frida Windolph, Frida Bennèche
- Occupation: Singer

Frida Katherina Benneche (June 10, 1880 – after 1943), sometimes written as Frida Bennèche or Freda Benneche, also known as Frida Windolph, was an American coloratura soprano.

== Early life ==
Benneche was born in New York City. Her mother was Magdalena Goelz Benneche. Her German-born father Edward Benneche was a businessman, and was president of the Arion Society, a German-American musical club in New York. She attended Miss Jaudon's School, studied violin and piano as a young woman, trained with Eugenie Pappenheim in New York, and studied voice with Theresa Seehofer in Berlin.

== Career ==
As Frida Windolph, she sang at musicales hosted by Pappenheim, and made some recordings for Phono-Cut Records early in her career. Benneche, a coloratura soprano, sang in concerts and church festivals in Europe, including at the Hamburg Summer Opera. She moved back to the United States in 1914. She toured in the United States, and made recordings of German-language songs on the Victor label in 1916 and 1917. "Her records are said to be some of the finest made," reported the Musical Courier in 1917, adding that "her voice is sweet without the least trace of shrillness."

Flautist Paul Henneberg composed two works for Benneche. She sang at Fourth of July festivities in Delaware Water Gap in 1918, and gave two radio concerts in 1924. She toured in Germany in 1926. In 1943 and 1944, she was a voice teacher in New York City.

== Personal life ==
Frida Benneche married architect August Paul Windolph in 1901; they divorced after 1910. She married metallurgist Erich Alfred Beck in 1919.
