= The Great Moment =

The Great Moment may refer to:

- The Great Moment (1921 film), an American silent drama film
- The Great Moment (1944 film), an American biographical film
