= Georgine von Januschofsky =

Czech actress, singer (1849–1914)

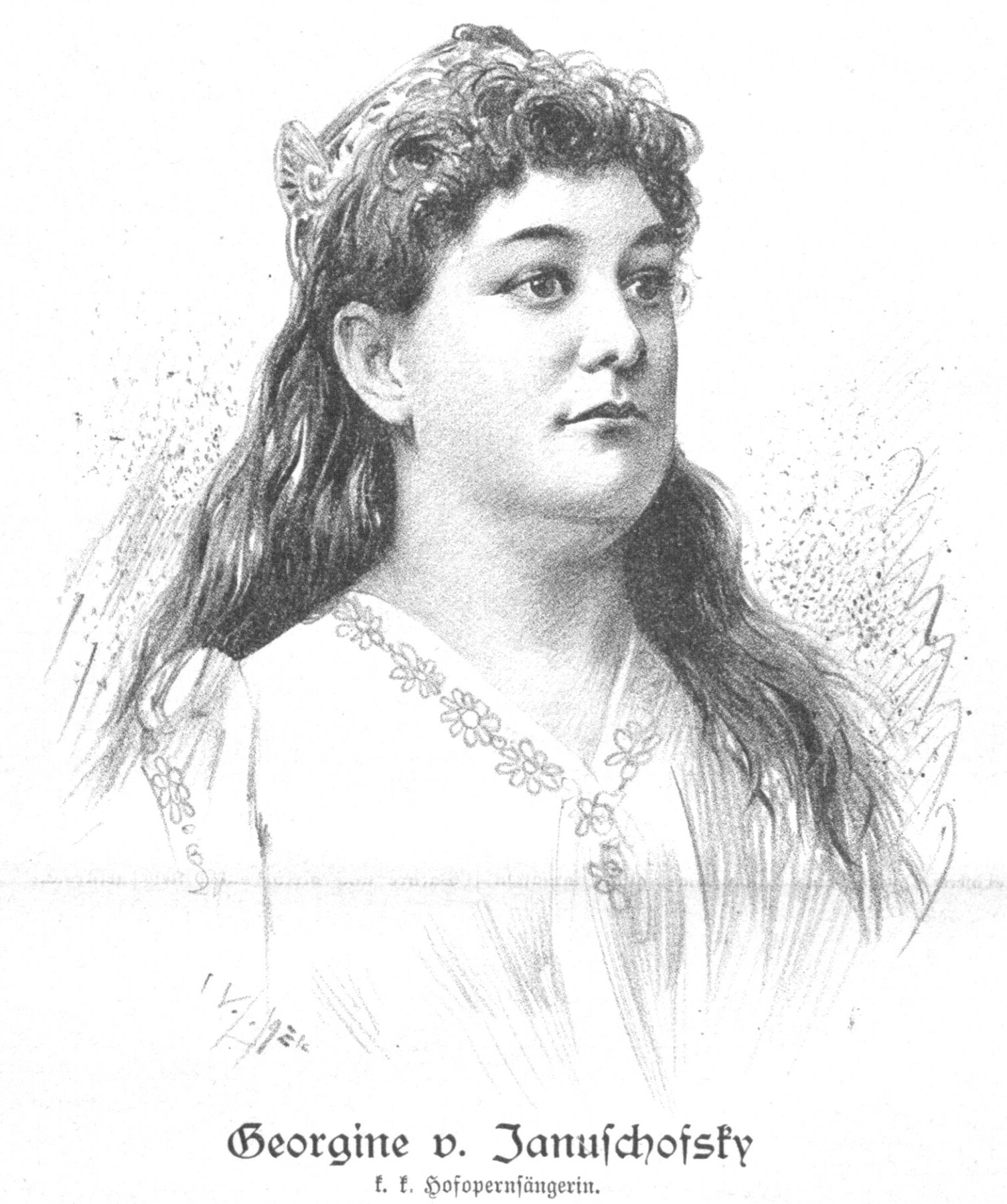
- Georgine von Januschofsky, from a portrait published in 1895
- Born: 4 October 1849; Olomouc, Moravia, Austrian Empire (now Czech Republic)
- Died: 6 September 1914 (aged 64); New York
- Other names: Georgine Januschowsky, Georgine Neuendorff (married name)
- Occupations: Actress, singer
- Spouse: Adolf Neuendorff (m. 1891)

Georgine von Januschofsky, surname sometimes spelled as Janouschoffsky or Janufchofsky, (4 October 1849 – 6 September 1914) was a Moravian actress and singer.

== Early life ==
Georgine Januschowsky was born in Olomouc, Moravia, in the Austrian Empire, the daughter of Georg von Ohm-Januschowsky and Julia Matthay. Her father was an editor and writer. Her brothers were writer Alexander Ohm-Januschowsky, and director Julius Ohm-Januschowsky. She trained as a singer in Vienna.

== Career ==
Januschofsky began her career as a child performer, appearing in operettas in Stuttgart, Vienna, and Leipzig as a young singer. She was a soprano soloist at the Vienna State Opera from 1893 to 1895.

Januschofsky was prominent in German-language theater and opera in New York City. She first appeared in the United States in 1880 at the Germania Theatre run by Adolf Neuendorff. In 1897 she sang with the Metropolitan Opera as the title character in Mataswintha, an opera by Xaver Scharwenka. In 1903 she was in the cast of Die Journalisten in Connecticut. She performed with the Irving Place German Theatre from 1904 to 1910, including Coulissenzauber (1907), Die Rabensteinerin (1908), Das Vierte Gebot (1908),The Lightning Girl (1909), Kabale und Liebe (1909), A Ragged Crowd (1909), Right About! (1909), and Die Gruenhoerner (1910).

In 1913, opera stars and musicians including Johanna Gadski, Victor Herbert, Carl Jörn, Nahan Franko, Putnam Griswold, Mathilde Cottrelly, Anna von Stranz-Fuehring, and Leo Schultz, performed at a benefit concert for Georgine von Neuendorff, when she was seriously ill.

== Personal life ==
Januschofsky married German conductor, composer and impresario Adolf Neuendorff in 1891, in Massachusetts. He died suddenly in 1897. She died at New York's Bellevue Hospital in 1914, aged 64 years. Her grave is in Green-Wood Cemetery in Brooklyn.
