= Edith Helena =

American singer (1876–1956)

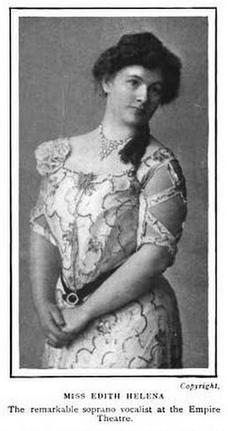
Edith Helena, from a 1904 publication.

Edith Helena (1876–1956) was an American singer of the Vaudeville era, although she also sang in opera as well.

She was born in New York City under the name of Edith Helen Seymour, however her stage name was Italianised to Edith Helena. She became famous for having a singing voice spanning four octaves, which also enabled her to perform violin imitations.

She was married to the writer Napoleon Augustus Jennings (1856–1919). During the first decade of the 20th century, the couple toured Europe and the United States with him as her manager and press agent.

Recordings of Edith Helena dating as far back as 1897 survive. She can also be seen in her sole film appearance, 1935 short "Roof Tops of Manhattan", singing "I've Got Rings on My Fingers."
