= Theodor Wachtel =

German tenor

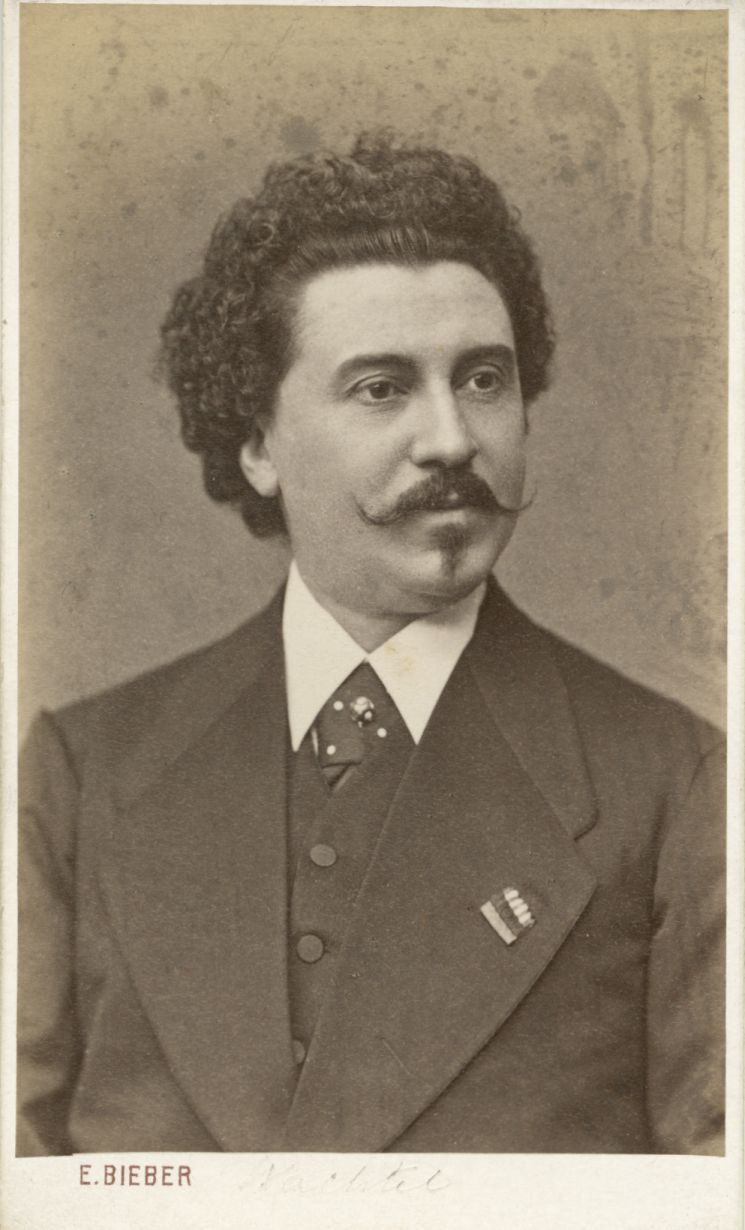

Theodor Wachtel (10 March 1823 – 14 November 1893) was a German tenor.

== Life ==
Born in Hamburg, Wachtel, born the son of a hackney carriage owner, was himself a haulage contractor after his father's death until his vocal ability was noticed.

His first teacher was Julie Grandjean in Hamburg. The twenty-six-year-old made his first attempt on the stage at the municipal theatre of his hometown; shortly before that, on 1 March 1849, he had already attracted the attention of the general public in a concert he had organised himself, in which his fellow countryman Johannes Brahms also took part.

As a beginner, Wachtel first worked at the court theatre in Schwerin for one year, then he turned to Würzburg, where he was encouraged by the lessons of the Kapellmeister Witt and the singer Frieda Beck-Weichselbaum. In 1852, he followed a call to the Staatstheater Darmstadt. There, he sang, among others, in the first Tannhäuser performance of Walther, and in 1853 he sang the title role in Der Postillon von Lonjumeau, in which he later had the greatest success. From 1854 until 1858, he worked in Hannover, then in Kassel, and from 1863 until 1865, he was a member of the Vienna court opera. Guest performances led him to all major opera houses in Germany, and from 1862 until 1868 he went to London for several months every year, where he sang on the Italian stage of the Coventgardentheater, in 1869 to Paris, in 1871 and 1878 to America.

From the end of the 60's, he did not take up a permanent stage position. He first chose his retirement home in Wiesbaden, later on, after several years in Berlin, he moved to Frankfurt, where he died at the age of 70. He gave his last concert in Berlin on 8 March 1893.

His best roles, apart from the postillon, which he played more than 1000 times, were "George Brown", "Sever", "Lyonel", "Vasco de Gama".

Wachtel's musical education was mostly constrained to only the technical training of his voice, which enabled him to appear before the Berlin audience at a charity concert on the eve of his seventieth birthday. However, Wachtel has always fallen short of even modest standards in acting and the spirit of his roles. (Note: Text nach Max Friedländer (ADB))

He was appointed an honorary member of the Mecklenburg State Theatre and Coburg.
