= Antonie Mielke =

German soprano (1856–1907)

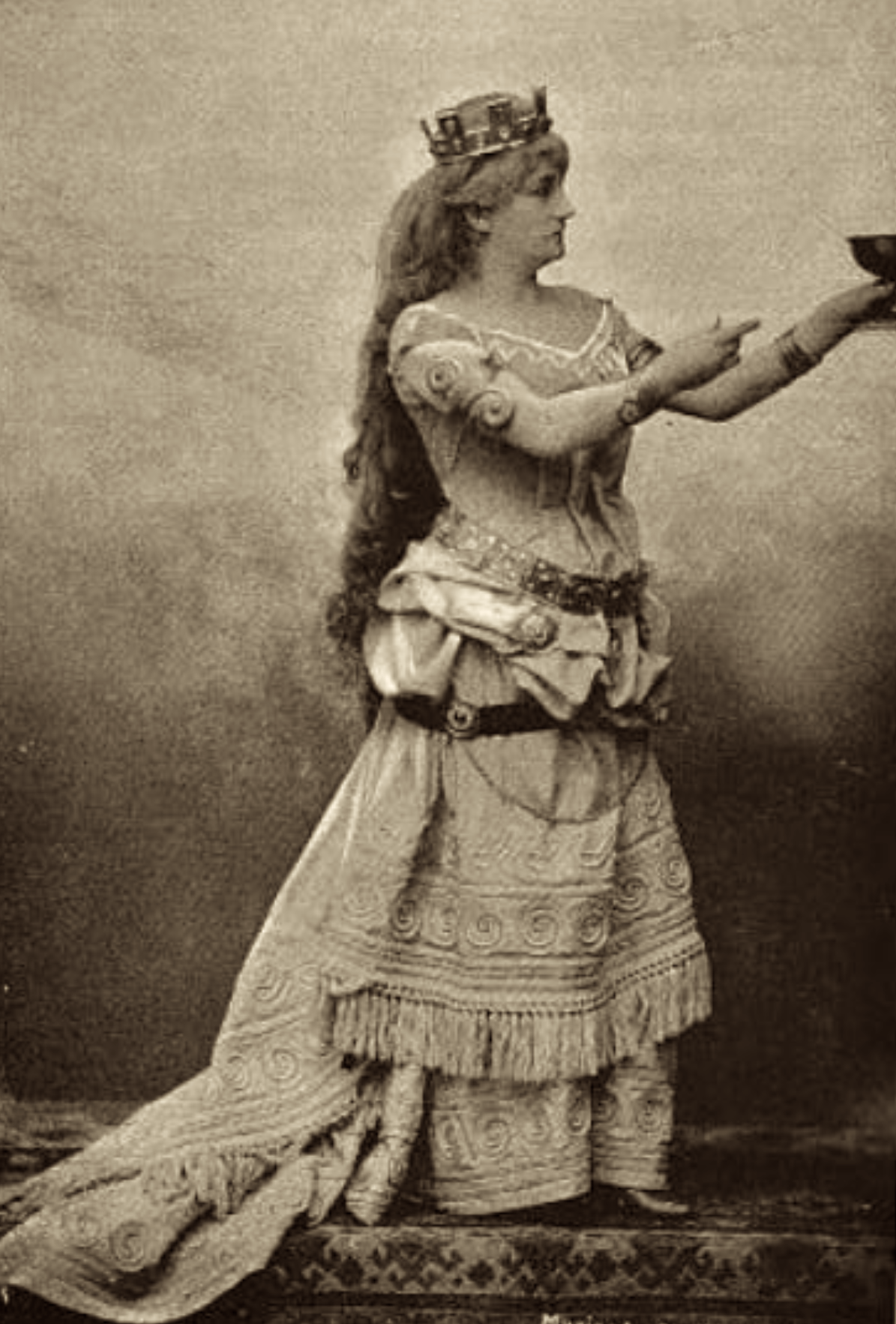
- Mielke as Wagner's Isolde
- Born: 14 April 1856; Berlin, Prussia
- Died: 15 November 1907 (aged 51); Berlin, German Empire
- Occupation: Operatic soprano
- Organizations: Vienna State Opera; Metropolitan Opera

Antonie Mielke, sometimes given as Antonia Mielke (14 April 1856 – 15 November 1907), was a German soprano who had an active international career in operas and concerts. She was particularly celebrated for her interpretations of characters in Richard Wagner's stage works.

Mielke was trained as a soprano first in Berlin at Theodor Kullak's music institute and later at the Cologne Conservatory. She began her career as a coloratura soprano in 1876 and spent two years performing this repertoire in German opera houses. Under Franz von Jauner she transitioned into a leading dramatic soprano at the Vienna Hofoper where she performed in 1878–1879.

Mielke married tenor Wilhelm Grüning in 1879 and did not perform for six years following her wedding. She returned to the stage in 1885, and was a leading soprano in European opera houses until coming to the United States where she was a resident soprano at the Metropolitan Opera in 1890–1891. In May 1891 she performed in The Damrosch Festival which was organized to inaugurate the opening of the newly built Carnegie Hall, singing in concerts for the hall's first week of performances. She also toured with the Boston Symphony Orchestra in 1891, and with the New York Philharmonic in 1892. After this she returned to Europe where she performed as a leading soprano until 1902 when an accident on stage led to her retirement. She taught singing in Berlin until her death in 1907.

== Early life and career ==
Antonie Mielke was born in Berlin on 14 April 1856. She was educated at Theodor Kullak's music institute in Berlin, the Neue Akademie der Tonkunst. There she studied singing with tenor Eduard Mantius. She later studied at the Cologne Conservatory.

Mielke began her career as a coloratura soprano. She made her professional opera debut as Marguerite de Valois in Meyerbeer's Les Huguenots at the Herzogliches Hoftheater in Dessau in 1876. She then was active as a guest singer at opera houses in Berlin, Cologne, Strasbourg, and Würzburg, before being hired by Franz von Jauner to the roster of principal artist at the Vienna Hofoper to fill the vacancy left by Marie Wilt. Under Jauner's leadership she transitioned into a leading dramatic soprano. She made her debut in Vienna in 1878 as Elsa in Wagner's Lohengrin; she became closely associated with his works.

In 1879 Mielke married tenor Wilhelm Grüning and temporarily abandoned her career. She returned to performing six years later at the Deutsche Oper in Rotterdam where she performed the title role of Leonore in Beethoven's Fidelio (1885). This was followed by work as a guest soprano in leading dramatic roles at opera houses in Berlin, Breslau, Leipzig, and St. Petersburg. She was a resident soprano at the Cologne Opera from 1888 through 1889.

== Work in the United States ==
In 1890–1891 Mielke was a principal soprano at the Metropolitan Opera (Met) in New York. She was hired to replace Lilli Lehmann's position with the company. She made her first appearance in the United States at the Metropolitan Opera House on 28 November 1890 as Elisabeth in Tannhäuser with Marie Jahn as Venus and Heinrich Gudehus in the title role. The New York Times wrote in its review of her Met debut:

Frau Antonia Mielke made her first appearance before an American audience as Elizabeth. She comes from the Stadt Theatre of Cologne, where she is a great favorite. She is a dramatic soprano with a rich, powerful, and resonant voice. It is not so mellow a voice as that of Lilli Lehmann, but it is equally forcible and somewhat more penetrating. Frau Mielke is unquestionably an experienced and splendidly trained artist. Her phrasing is most admirable, especially in recitative passages, which she read last night with splendid intelligence and true eloquence. Her cantabile is broad and expressive, and in her first scene last evening she moved her audience to enthusiasm and gave promise of ability to handle such roles as Brünnhilde in an impressive manner. She is a tall and dignified woman, who treads the stage with fine poise and shows the results of experience and study as an actress.

Mielke was celebrated in New York in the dramatic soprano repertoire. Her other characters in operas at the Met included Leonore in Fidelio, Meyerbeer's Berthe in Le Prophète and Selika in L'Africaine, Wager roles Brünnhilde in the Ring cycle, Isolde in Tristan und Isolde, and Senta in The Flying Dutchman. Her final performance at the Met was in a concert honoring the Met's director Edmund C. Stanton on 9 April 1891. She also appeared in New York as Kundry in Wagner's Parsifal at the Brooklyn Academy of Music in March 1891 with Anton Seidl conducting. In May 1891 she toured to Boston with the Met to perform the part of Leonora in the fourth act of Verdi's Il trovatore which was performed in German at Boston Music Hall. Victor Herbert conducted the concert, which also included excerpts from operas by other Italian composers. Boston critic Philip Hale, while acknowledging her earlier success in Boston singing Wagner, was particularly critical of Mielke's singing in the Italian repertoire. He stated:

[Mielke] attempted to sing purely vocal music, and in the music of Bellini and Verdi her failure was complete. Her tone-production was faulty; she was at times unable to sustain a tone without wandering from the pitch; she constantly abused the portamento; her performances of runs, flourishes, and ornaments was crude and unmusical.

In March 1891 Mielke sang a program of excerpts from operas by Wagner with the Boston Symphony Orchestra, tenor Andreas Dippel, and conductor Arthur Nikisch for performances at the Academy of Music in Philadelphia, the Concordia Opera House in Baltimore, Lincoln Music Hall in Washington, D.C., and Boston Music Hall. In May 1891 she participated in The Damrosch Festival which was created to inaugurate the newly built Carnegie Hall (CH) in a series of concerts presented over a five day period from 5 May 1891 through 9 May 1891. Mielke performed in the second concert performed at the CH, portraying the part of the Widow in Mendelssohn's Elijah which had opened just one day prior to this concert. This work was performed with the Oratorio Society of New York and bass Emil Fischer singing the title part. She later repeated Elijah at Pittsburgh's May Festival later that month. She also was the soprano soloist in Leopold Damrosch's cantata Sulamith which was performed at the CH on 8 May 1891.

In late May 1891 Mielke left the United States for Germany. By April 1892 she was back in New York City performing in concerts with the New York Symphony Orchestra led by Walter Damrosch. She returned to the Metropolitan Opera House that same month to sing with the Met's orchestra led by Anton Seidl in a benefit concert for the YWCA. She also gave a concert under Seidl at the Brooklyn Academy of Music on 3 May 1892, in which she performed opera excerpts with Dippel and Fischer. The following day she went to Boston to sing the part of Kundry in both matinee and evening performances of Parsifal at the Boston Music Hall under conductor Benjamin Johnson Lang. Later in the month she was a soloist with the New York Philharmonic for performances at the Cincinnati May Festival and the Rochester Music Festival.

In 1892 Mielke sang the recitative and aria "Ocean, thou mighty monster" from Weber's Oberon in the 50th anniversary concert of the New York Philharmonic (NYP), a concert which recreated the program presented by the NYP (then called the Philharmonic Society of New York) for its very first concert in 1842.

== Later life and career ==
In October 1892 Mielke performed at the Bavarian State Opera in Munich and was briefly under consideration as a replacement for Therese Vogl, who had just retired from that theatre. Following this she successfully obtained a position as the prima donna at the Breslau Opera House where she sang from 1892-1895. She left there to join the roster of principal singers at the Stadttheater Danzig where she was in residence for the 1895–1896 season. From 1896 to 1898 she was a leading soprano at the Stadttheater Elberfeld. After this she was at the Cologne Opera House again, in 1899–1900, and in March 1900 she performed the role of Selika in L'Africaine at the Strasbourg Opera House.

Mielke retired from performance after being traumatized by an accident on stage in 1902. She was portraying Elsa in Lohengrin and was being carried by four men on top of their shields. One of the men tripped, and she fell to the stage floor. According to The New York Times the trauma of the incident made Mielke "a nervous wreck" and she never performed again. In retirement she worked as a voice teacher in Berlin. One of her pupils was Margaret Matzenauer.

Mielke died in Berlin on 15 November 1907 at the age of 51. The cause of death was heart disease.
