= Franz Wilczek =

Austrian-American musician and author

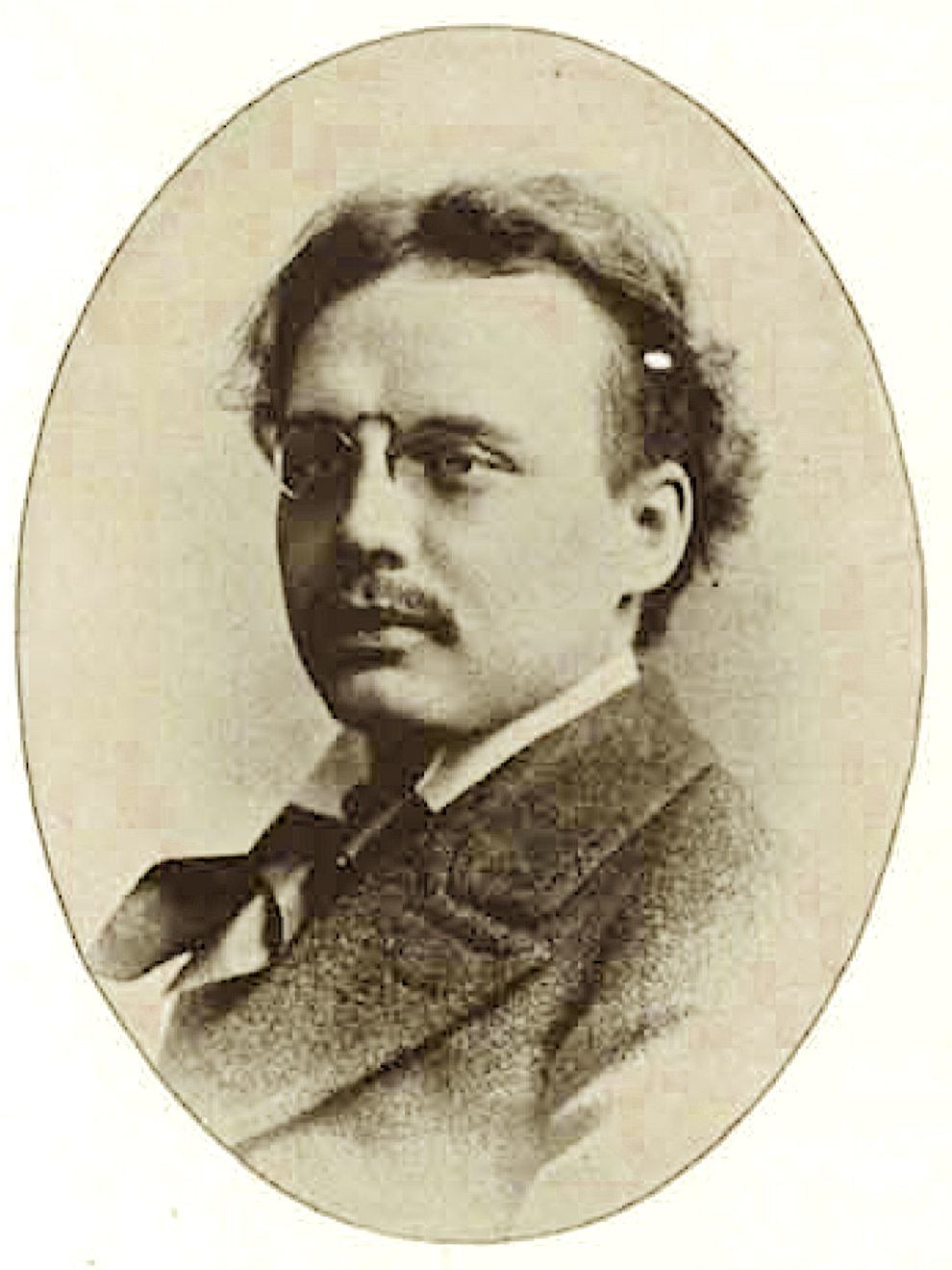
- Franz Wilczek
- Born: March 3, 1869; Graz, Austria-Hungary
- Died: January 15, 1916 (aged 46); Chicago, Illinois, US
- Occupations: violinist, music educator

Franz Rudolph Wilczek (3 March 1869 – 15 January 1916) was an Austrian-born American violinist, music teacher, and author. He had an active performance career from 1878 through 1915. He performed as a concert violinist with many of the top American orchestras, including the Boston Symphony Orchestra and the Chicago Symphony Orchestra. From 1893 to 1901 he performed in annual tours with his own ensemble, the Franz Wilczek Concert Company. He was head of the Omaha Conservatory of Music from 1904 to 1906, after which he taught violin in Los Angeles, Paris, and Berlin. His book Shall I Go to Europe to Study? was published by John Friedrich & Bro. in 1913. At the end of his life he lived in Chicago where he died of cancer in 1916.

For part of his career Wilczek played on a Stradivarius violin owned by W. C. Clopton of New York. When not using this instrument, he used a violin made by John Friedrich which he owned. This violin was constructed from repurposed wood that had once been part of a table built generations earlier by Native Americans, and allegedly given by them to the first white child born in the Wyoming Valley after the Wyoming Massacre.

== Early life and education in Austria: 1869–1888 ==
Franz Rudolph Wilczek was born on 3 March 1869 in Graz, Austria. His father worked as a civil servant for the Austrian government. A child prodigy, he began training as a violinist at the age of five and began his career as a concert violinist in Austria at the age of 9. He studied at the Vienna Conservatory where he was sent at the age of seven. He later attended the Graz Conservatory from which he graduated at the age of 15.

After completing his degree in Graz, Wilczek studied violin with Joseph Joachim for three years at the Royal Music Institute of Berlin. He was admitted into the Berlin Conservatory for further training, but was not able to attend due to being conscripted into the Austrian military. He appealed to Franz Joseph I to be released from his service but was refused. In order to escape work as a soldier, he left Austria for the United States in 1888 and became a naturalized American citizen.

== Early life and career in North America: 1888–1893 ==
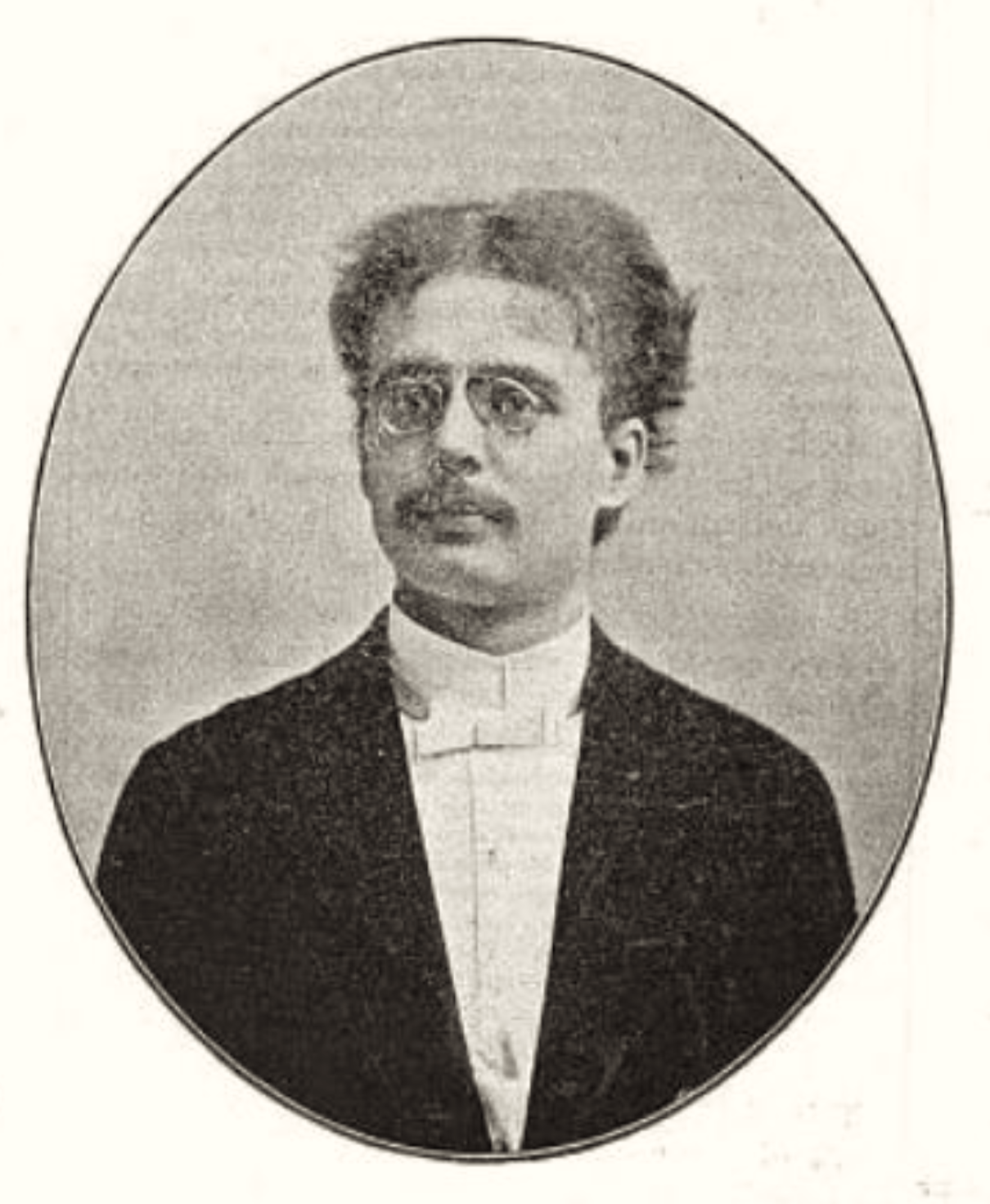
Franz Wilczek. Published on the front cover of The Musical Courier on November 26, 1890.

Upon arriving in the United States, Wilczek went to Pittsburgh, Pennsylvania, in December 1888 to visit an acquaintance of his, a Miss Mamie Reuck, who was also a violinist. Wilcek and Reuck had met earlier in Austria while they were both violin students, and had performed duets together in concerts in that country. They began a romantic relationship in Austria, and by 1890 were engaged to be married. The couple married in Allegheny, Pennsylvania, on 3 October 1893.

In Pittsburgh Wilczek initially performed with local amateur groups, such as the Ladies' Choral Club, and also appeared in concert with the American concert pianist Neally Stevens at the Pittsburgh Club Theater in January 1889. He left Pittsburgh for New York City where in February 1889 he gave his first professional performance in that city at Chickering Hall. He returned to Pittsburgh for performances at the Pittsburgh May Festival, and during that festival performed duets with Reuck.

In November 1889 Wilcek performed Pablo de Sarasate's Zigeunerweisen and Ludwig van Beethoven's Romance No. 1 and Romance No. 2 with Theodore Thomas and his orchestra (a forerunner to the Chicago Symphony Orchestra) at Pittsburgh's Old City Hall; a program which was later repeated at New York's Lenox Lyceum. In reviewing the latter concert, The Musical Courier critic stated:

A genuine surprise and a most pleasing one was the first appearance here of Mr. Franz Wilczek, a young Austrian violinist and a pupil of Joachim. He came, played and conquered... He performed with exquisite tone, purity of intonation, excellent and finished technique and good bowing, and he pleased the public no less through the artistic value of his playing than by means of the charm and apparent modesty of his personality both of which acted like a genuine revelation. It goes without saying that the young artist was heartedly applauded and after a triple recall he added as an encore Sarasate's difficult Zigeunerweisen, which, under Victor Herbert's direction of the orchestral accompaniment, was performed in a most brilliant manner.

During the 1889–1890 season, Wilczek performed in a series of concerts in New York City at both the Lenox Lyceum and Steinway Hall. One of his concerts at the latter venue was with Metropolitan Opera baritone Theodor Reichmann. He also performed with the Amphion Musical Society of Brooklyn under conductor C. Mortimer Wiske in February 1890. The following April he performed in concerts with soprano Mary Howe in Massachusetts, and at Lincoln Music Hall in Washington D.C. in a benefit concert for the Washington Home for Incurables. The following month he performed in several music festivals across North America, including performances in Memphis, Indianapolis (Tomlinson Hall, Violin Concerto by Felix Mendelssohn), Saint Paul, Minnesota, Rutland, Vermont, and Kingston, Ontario. The following November he rejoined Theodore Thomas and his orchestra to perform Henri Vieuxtemps's Fantaisie-caprice at the Lenox Lyceum. He was featured on the front cover of the November 26, 1890, edition of The Musical Courier.

In January 1891 Wilczek returned to Pittsburgh for performances with the Toerge Brothers Orchestra at Lafayette Hall, after which he reunited with soprano Mary Howe for performances in New Jersey and Vermont. In February 1891 he performed a benefit concert at Carnegie Music Hall to raise funds for the Pennsylvania Music Teachers Association. He reunited with Theodor Reichmann the following month to perform a recital together at Chickering Hall. In April 1891 he gave a concert with the English baritone Charles Santley in Montreal, and performed three violin solos in a concert of opera excerpts at the Academy of Music in Philadelphia which also featured singers Clémentine de Vère, Clara Poole, Italo Campanini, and Giuseppe Del Puente. In May 1891 he gave a concert with soprano Olga Islar and the Garland Musical Association at Ford's Grand Opera House in Baltimore; performed with the orchestra of the Metropolitan Opera under Anton Seidl at the Pittsburgh May Festival; and performed Henryk Wieniawski's Violin Concerto No. 1 with Theodore Thomas and his orchestra at the Indianapolis May Festival.

Wilczek was a soloist at the Worcester Music Festival in September 1891. After this he spent the remainder of the year touring with the De Vère Campanini Concert Company. In January 1892 he gave a concert with soprano Lillian Nordica at Music Hall in Lewiston, Maine. In March 1892 he performed as a soloist with the St. Louis Symphony Orchestra (then called the St. Louis Choral-Symphony Society) at St. Louis Exposition and Music Hall, and with the Amphion Musical Society of Brooklyn at the Brooklyn Academy of Music. The following month he performed with German soprano Irene Pevny at Windsor Hall in Montreal, and performed a recital with Marie Ritter-Goetze at Madison Square Garden in New York. He performed with the De Vère Campanini Concert Company again in October 1892, after which he toured in concerts for with contralto Rosa Linde in the 1892–1893 season for performances in Virginia, New Jersey, Pennsylvania, Rhode Island, Ohio, Indiana, and Vermont.

== Franz Wilczek Concert Company and other performances: 1893–1901 ==
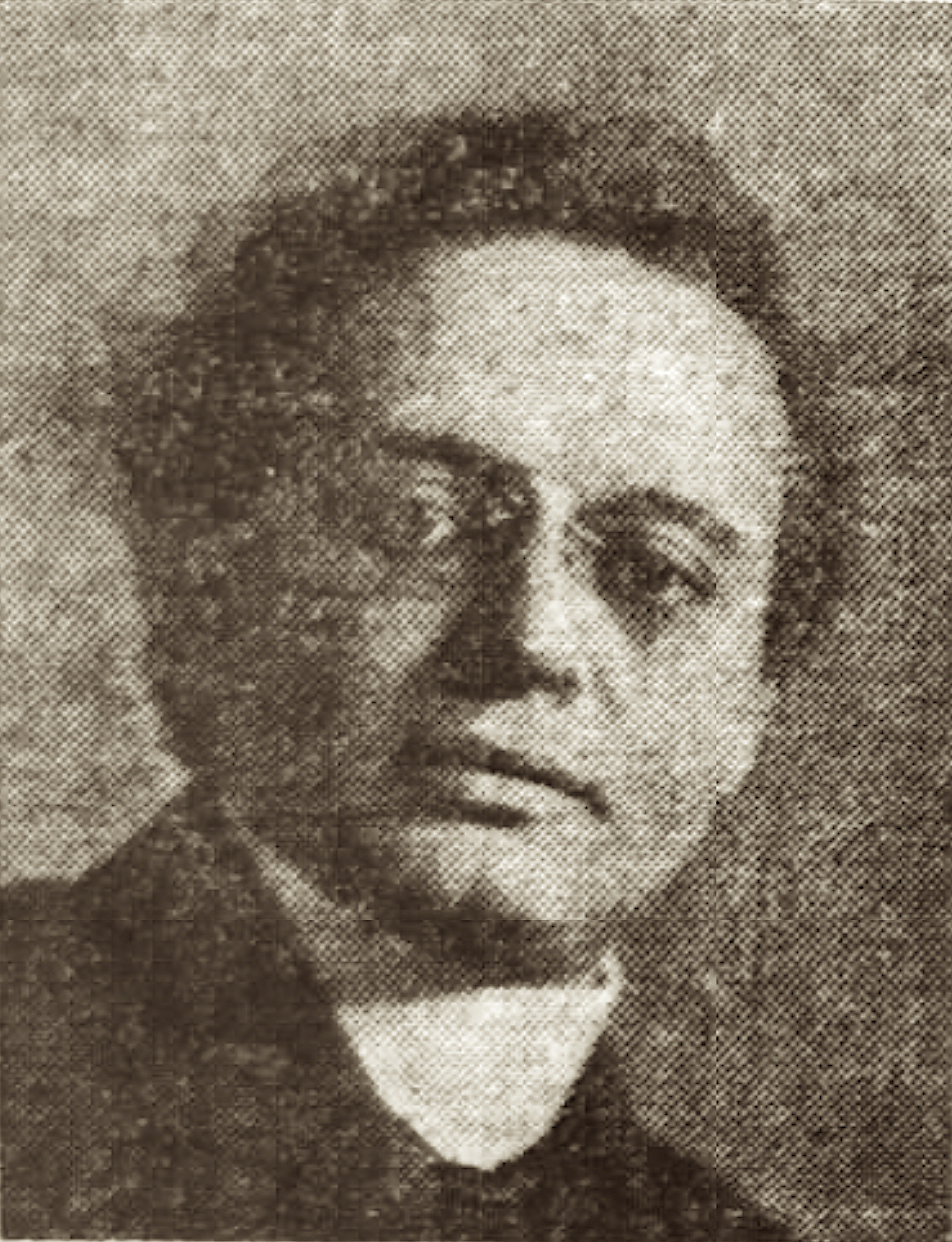
Franz Wilcek

In 1893 Wilczek formed his own touring group, the Franz Wilczek Concert Company (FWCC). Original performers in this group included his wife, the violinist Mamie Reuck-Wilczek, soprano Inez Parmater, the Russian bass Basil Tetson, contralto Jacobina Weichmann, Belgian cellist Flavia Van den Hende, tenor Bernard Einsteine, and pianist Edwin M. Shonert. The company's tour began in New Jersey in July 1893. In the 1893–1894 season the FWCC toured to theaters in Michigan, Ohio, Pennsylvania, Ontario, New York, Kansas, Missouri, Alabama, Mississippi, Tennessee, and West Virginia. The company continued to tour nationally in the 1894–1895 season, the 1895–1896 season, and the 1896–1897 season.

In March 1895 Wilcek gave a recital at the Brooklyn Institute with the blind pianist Edward Baxter Perry. In March 1897 he performed at a state dinner at the White House given by American president William McKinley and first lady Ida Saxton McKinley for the Cabinet of the United States. In the beginning of the 1897–1898 season both he and his wife toured as soloists with the Women's Philharmonic Orchestra of Boston. In January 1898 they resumed touring with the FWCC. In March 1898 Wilcek performed in a benefit concert at the Metropolitan Opera House, and the following May he entered the vaudeville arena when he joined the roster of artists at Proctor's Theatre in Manhattan.

Wilcek toured once again with the FWCC in the 1898–1899 season. In March 1899 he performed Louis Spohr's Eighth Violin Concerto at the Brooklyn Institute. The following month he was a soloist in a concert put on by Maurice Grau's opera company at the Brooklyn Academy of Music where he performed Niccolò Paganini's Le Streghe among other repertoire. In May 1899 he gave a concert at Musical Fund Hall in Philadelphia.

Wilcek toured again with the FWCC in the 1899–1900 season and 1900–1901 season. In November 1899 he performed in concert with contralto Clara Butt at Mendelssohn Hall in New York City. In addition to touring he gave several public recitals sponsored by the Aeolian Company to demonstrate their products such as the pianola. In January 1900 he performed a concert with pianist Isidore Luckstone at the Brooklyn Institute. After the end of the FWCC tour he was once again engaged in vaudeville in New York in March 1900, this time at Proctor's Palace Theatre on 58th St. In December 1900 and April 1901 he was a soloist with the Washington Saengerbund at the National Theatre in Washington, D.C. He performed an arrangement of Edvard Grieg's Peer Gynt for violin, cello, and piano at the Brooklyn Institute (BI) in April 1901 which accompanied a dramatic reading of the play of the same name. He returned to the BI the following October to perform in a concert with soprano Marie Kunkel Zimmerman, baritone Julian Walker, and contralto Gertrude May Stein.

== Later life and career: 1902–1916 ==
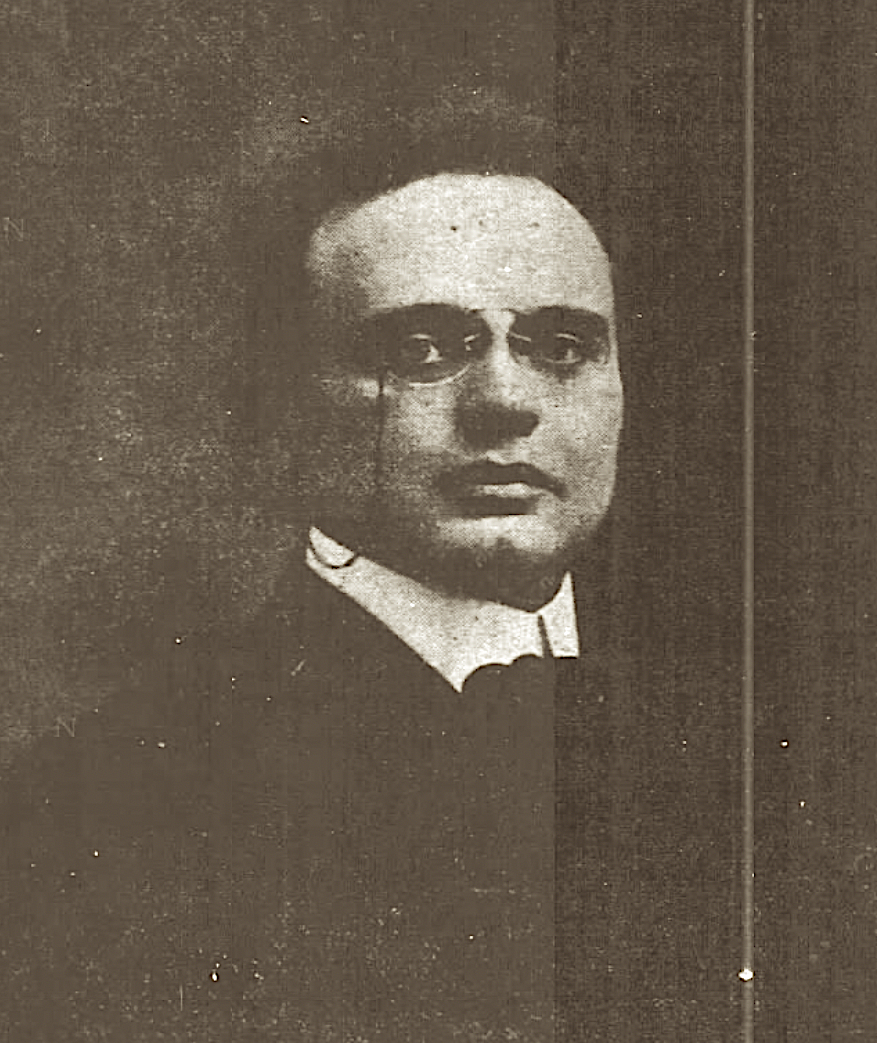
Franz Wilcek, published 1902

On February 14, 1902, Wilcek performed a recital with baritone Antonio Scotti at the Columbia Theatre in Washington D.C. In March 1902 he performed as a soloist with the Arion Society and soprano Emma Juch at the Brooklyn Academy of Music, and was featured as a soloist in a benefit concert at the Metropolitan Opera House. That same month he entertained Prince Henry of Prussia in performance with soprano Emma Calvé in a private concert at the home of Ogden Mills.

In September 1902 Wilcek gave a concert tour in Australia. On his travels back to the mainland of the United States he stopped in Hawaii where he gave a concert at the opera house in Honolulu in October 1902. He then performed with the Danish violinist Max Schlüter in concerts at the Alhambra Theatre in San Francisco in November 1904. That same month he was a soloist in concerts with the Los Angeles Symphony Orchestra with whom he performed Max Bruch's Romance in A minor, Zigeunerweisen by Pablo de Sarasate. Karl Goldmark's Suites for Violin and Piano, and Vieuxtemps's Fantaisie-caprice. He also gave recitals at the Los Angeles Theater on November 26, 1902, and at Steinway Hall in San Francisco on December 5, 1902.

In February 1903 Wilcek performed with soprano Charlotte Maconda and the Orpheus Club in Patterson, New Jersey. On April 2, 1903, he appeared in a joint recital with contralto Marguerite Hall at Mendelssohn Hall in New York City. In February 1904 he gave a concert at the Bijou Theater in Pittsburgh.

It was announced in August 1903 that Wilcek was to be the head of a new conservatory of music established in Omaha, Nebraska. He arrived in Nebraska in September 1904, and the following month gave a concert with Omaha's Bohemian Singing Society. In 1904 and 1905 he appeared in multiple concerts with the Musical Art Society of Omaha. He remained active as a performer and teacher in Omaha in 1906. In September 1906 he left Omaha for California. He gave a recital at Simpson's Auditorium in Los Angeles in December 1906.

In March 1905 Wilcek filed for divorce from his first wife, Mamie, alleging that she abandoned him in 1903. Their divorce was finalized by January 1906. He married Lena May Newton on 27 October 1906 in Ocean Park, California. Newton, a native of Los Angeles, had studied violin under Wilcek at the Omaha Conservatory which is how the couple met. After their marriage Wilcek taught violin out of a private studio in Los Angeles. In 1907 he gave a recital at Whittier College.

In November 1908 Wilcek traveled to Europe with his second wife and their young son. He was active as a violin teacher in Europe, working in Paris and Berlin. He and his wife were living in Paris in 1910. In September 1911 Lena filed for divorce from Franz, and a custody battle was fought over their son. Wilcek was living in Vienna at the time of this event in November 1911. Around this same time he performed as a soloist with Vienna's Tonkünstler Orchestra. While in Vienna he wrote the book Shall I Go to Europe to Study? in 1912. It was published by John Friedrich & Bro. in 1913 and advocated for American musicians to take advantage of training available to them in the United States rather than going to Europe.

Wilcek joined the faculty of the Von Stein Academy of Music in Los Angeles in the autumn of 1912. By January 1915 he was in residence in Chicago. He played Max Bruch's Romance in A minor with the Cincinnati Symphony Orchestra in February 1915.

Wilcek died of cancer at the age of 46 on January 15, 1916, in Chicago.
