= Pauline Schöller =

Austrian soprano and voice teacher

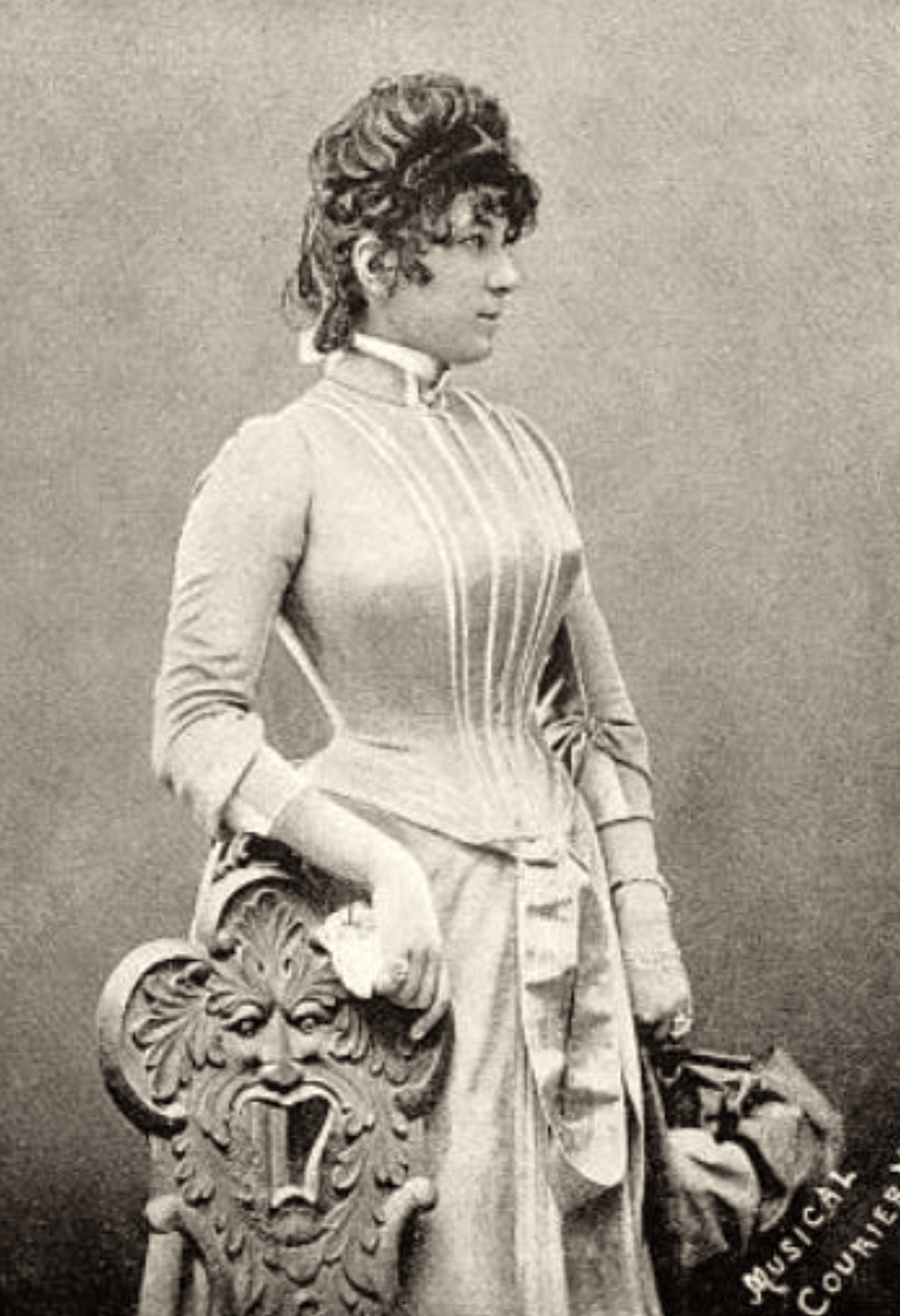
Pauline Schöller

Pauline Schöller, also known as Pauline Schöller-Haag or Pauline Haag, (10 March 1859 – 16 August 1941) was an Austrian soprano and voice teacher. She had an active international career as an opera singer from 1877 until her semi-retirement from the stage in 1901. Thereafter she only periodically performed in operas, and mainly devoted her time to teaching singing in Munich. She died there in 1941.

== Life and career ==
Pauline Schöller was born on 10 March 1859 in Vienna. A child prodigy, her talents in music were identified at an early age by Johann Strauss II who was a friend of her parents. She began piano studies as a child and obtained proficiency as a concert pianist. She studied singing with Josef Rupprecht who was the choirmaster at Karlskirche; also training as a singer with that church's cantor Otto Uffmann.

Schöller made her stage debut in the opera house in Bad Ischl in 1877 as Marguerite in Charles Gounod's Faust. She soon after performed the part of Leonora in Giuseppe Verdi's Il trovatore at that theatre. From 1878-1880 sh was active as a guest artist at several theaters; among them Theater Basel, the Stadttheater Königsberg, and the Graz Opera.

In 1881-1882 Schöller was a resident artist at the Staatstheater Nürnberg. She left there to join the roster of singers at the Berlin Hofoper where she performed a total of eleven roles from 1882 through 1885. After this she was a leading soprano at the Bavarian State Opera (BSO) from 1885-1890. In 1889 she appeared as a guest artist at the Kroll Opera House as Marguerite de Valois in Les Huguenots; a role she had previously sung for her debut at the Vienna State Opera where she was active in the early 1880s.

In 1890 Schöller left Germany for the United States to join the company of resident singers at the Metropolitan Opera ("Met") in New York City. She was committed to that theatre for the 1890-1891 season; being brought to the company by Edmund C. Stanton. She made her debut as Valentine in Les Huguenots on 3 December 1890. At the Met she starred as Naia in the United States premiere of Antonio Smareglia’s II Vassallo di Szigeth on 12 December 1890. She also performed the title role in the American premiere of Diana von Solange on 9 January 1891 at the Metropolitan Opera House. Her final appearance at the Met was on 14 March 1891 as Elsa in Lohengrin. In January 1891 she performed the part of Brünnhilde in a concert performance of Götterdämmerung with the New York Symphony Orchestra.

She returned to the BSO in 1895 where she was again a performer until leaving her post in 1901. After this she occasionally continued to work on the stage as a guest artist, but was primarily active as a voice teacher in Munich. He final appearances at the BSO in the 1904-1905 season. In 1906 she portrayed Aminta in Il re pastore at the Salzburg State Theatre.

Schöller's other repertoire included Adalgisa in Norma, both Countess Almaviva and Susanna in The Marriage of Figaro, Elisabeth in Tannhäuser, Kundry in Parsifal, Pamina in The Magic Flute, Senta in The Flying Dutchman, Sieglinde in The Ring Cycle, and the title roles in Aida, Carmen, and Mignon.

Schöller died in Munich on 16 August 1941.
