= Rosa Linde =

American contralto

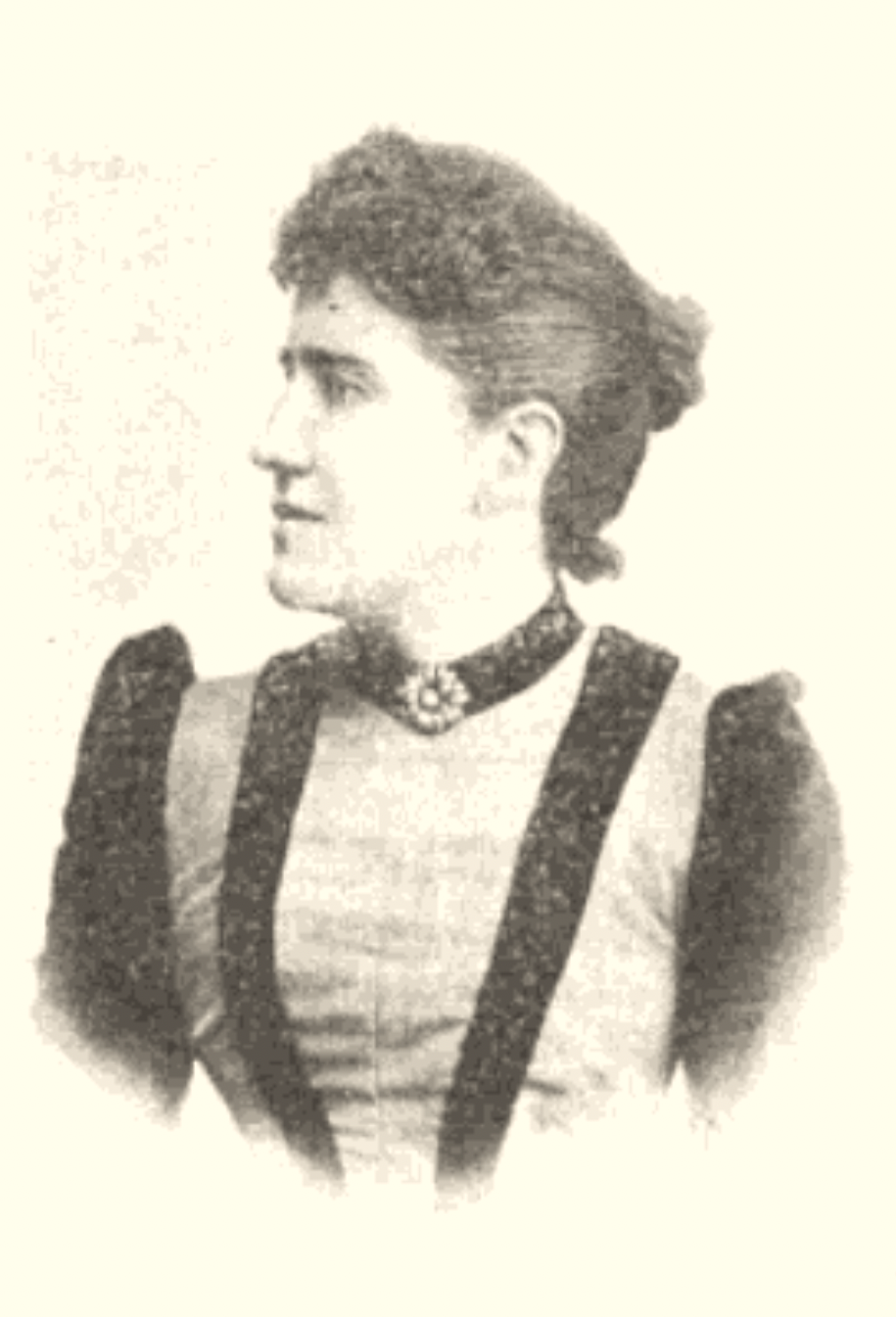
Rosa Linde

Rosa Schwender, also given as Rosie Gschwender, (c. 1863 - September 3, 1921) was an American contralto. Born in Chicago and raised in Pittsburgh, she married, Edward Schaarschmidt in 1880 and began her singing career as Rosa Schaarschmidt in the early 1880s. She was a prominent concert and church singer in Pittsburgh until moving to New York City in late 1887. There she adopted the stage name Rosa Linde and became a well known performer in concerts and operas on the national stage. Some of the organizations she performed with included the Boston Symphony Orchestra, the Buffalo Symphony Orchestra, the Castle Square Opera Company, and the Metropolitan Opera among others. After marrying Frank Page Wright, she was sometimes billed as Rosa Linde Wright. He daughter was the soprano Nellie Linde Wright.

== Early life and career ==
The daughter of George Schwender (also given as Gschwender) and Rosa Schwender (née Gassmer), Rosa Schwender was born in Chicago, Illinois in c. 1863. She had one brother, George Schwender Jr. She moved to Pittsburgh, Pennsylvania, where by 1868 her father was operating the tavern George Gschwender's Hall at the corner of Penn Street and Market House. Her father died in 1869. She studied music in Pittsburgh with J. E. Gleffer and organist and conductor Carl Retter. In October 1876 she sang in a benefit concert to raise funds for the families of the victims of an explosion at the Sable Iron Works.

Rosa married her first husband, Edward Schaarschmidt, and became known as Mrs. Rosa Schaarschmidt while living in Pittsburgh. Their marriage took place on April 11, 1880. By 1881 she was working as a church singer at St. Andrew's Episcopal Church, and the following year was named in The Pittsburgh Post as one of the highest paid church singers in the city. She left that post in September 1886 to join the music staff of Sixth Presbyterian Church of Pittsburgh.

In 1882 Rosa performed in concert with the Art Society of Pittsburgh, and portrayed the role of Ortrud in Richard Wagner's Lohengrin in a truncated version of the opera given at Pittsburgh's Library Hall. By December 1884 she was working as a singer at St. Peter's Episcopal Church, Pittsburgh. In the summers of 1885 and 1886 she performed as a soloist with an orchestra organized by K. F. W. Guenther and brothers George Toerge and Frederick Toerge in a series of concerts held at Silver Lake in the East Liberty neighborhood of Pittsburgh.

In January 1886 Rosa performed in a concert commemorating the centennial of the death of philosopher and theologian Moses Mendelssohn which was led by Carl Retter. The following month she was a soloist in Felix Mendelssohn's Athalie at Pittsburgh's Choral Hall. In March 1886 it was announced in the press that Rosa had filed for divorce from her husband due to mistreatment, and that she and her child were represented by lawyer J. L. McCutcheon. The divorce was finalized on grounds of dessertion in April 1886. A month after her divorce she sang in a benefit convert for Allegheny General Hospital.

In 1887 Rosa performed in Pittsburgh concerts with the Gernert and Guenther's Orchestra, and appeared in concert at the Pittsburgh School of Design. In March 1887 she performed with the Mozart Club at Old City Hall as a soloist in Alfred Gaul's The Holy City, and performed in a lecture-recital given in collaboration with rabbi Emil G. Hirsch at the Eighth Street Synagogue (now Rodef Shalom Congregation). In summer of 1887 she was a soloist in a festival organized by the Nord-Amerikanischer Sängerbund which was held in Pittsburgh and featured a choir of more than 800 singers from all over the United States and an orchestra led by Fidelis Zitterbart.

== Move to New York, early work on the national stage, and studies in Europe ==
In November 1887 it was reported in Pittsburgh Post-Gazette that Rosa had left Pittsburgh for more lucrative opportunities elsewhere. She relocated to New York City after being offered a contract as a singer at Mount Morris Baptist Church (MMBC) where she was committed for one year. She left that post 1889 to just the music staff of Madison Square Presbyterian Church which was then pastored by Charles Henry Parkhurst. She remained there for ten years. In New York City she studied with conductor and composer Reinhold L. Herman (1849–1919).

On the concert stage, Rosa made her New York City concert debut with the Liederkranz of the City of New York in January 1888 in which she performed excerpts from operas under conductor Theodore Thomas. Shortly after arriving in New York City she met businessman Frank Page Wright and began a romantic relationship with him. In 1889 it was reported in the press that they were engaged to be married. The couple did eventually marry, and Frank managed Rosa's career. He became step-father to Rosa's daughter from her first marriage, Cornelia. She had a career as a soprano under the name Nellie Linde Wright (later Cornelia Wright Harper after her marriage).

In the autumn of 1888 Rosa started appearing in concerts under the name Rosa Linde as part of the Emma Juch Concert Company (EJCC) whose membership also included pianist Adele aus der Ohe and a young Victor Herbert as the company's concert cellist. The EJCC's tour commenced at the Academy of Music in Milwaukee, Wisconsin on October 1, 1888 with Linde appearing as Siebel in the opera Faust with Juch as Marguerite and William Lavin in the title role. The EJCC tour lasted 11 weeks and included stops in theaters in Minnesota, Iowa, Nebraska, Kansas, Missouri, and Pennsylvania. A second tour with Juch began at the beginning of February 1889 at the Taylor Opera House in Trenton, New Jersey with baritone Joseph Lynde joining the company. This tour included stops at theaters in Connecticut, New York, Virginia, Kentucky, Tennessee, North Carolina, Georgia, and Florida.

In autumn of 1889 Linde went on tour with cornetist Jules Levy and his concert troupe which included performances in Virginia, Pennsylvania, Illinois, and Indiana. When the tour reached Pittsburgh an argument between Levy and Linde led her to leave the tour, and she instead gave a solo recital in her former hometown at the end of November 1889. She returned to New York and appeared in concert with the Amphion Musical Society of Brooklyn and conductor C. Mortimer Wiske shortly before leaving for Paris in December 1889 to study singing with Pauline Viardot-Garcia. After several months of study in Paris she went to Vienna to work briefly with Marianne Brandt. She returned to New York in June 1890.

== 1890s performances ==
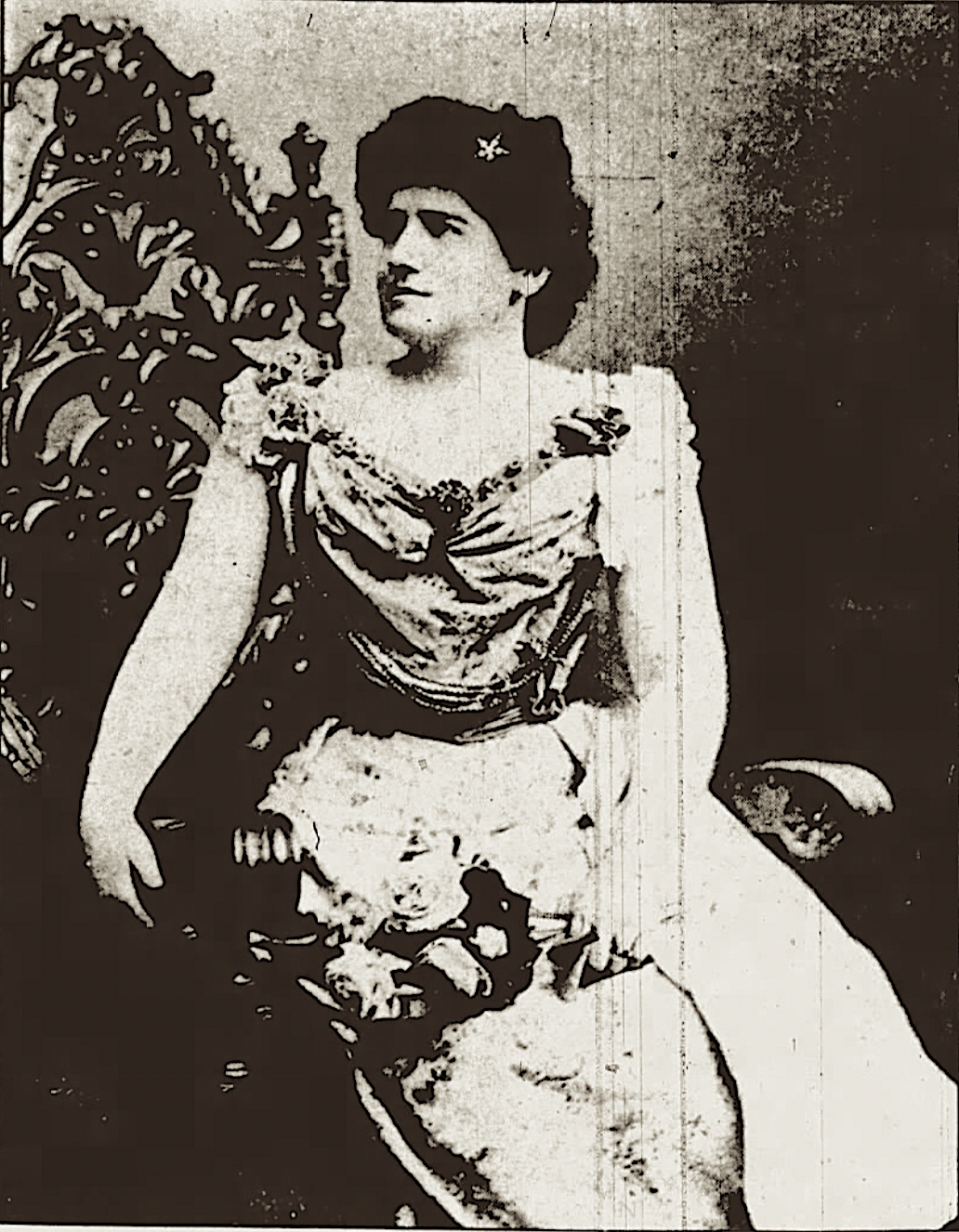
Rosa Linde, published 1899

Newly home from Paris, Linde performed with tenor Italo Campanini at Chickering Hall in June 1890. She then performed with Patrick Gilmore and his military band at Manhattan Beach, Brooklyn for an Independence Day celebration in which she sang the drinking song, "Il segreto per esser felici", from Donizetti's Lucrezia Borgia. The following October she performed with soprano Emma Cecilia Thursby at the Tremont Temple in Boston. In December 1890 she performed with Zitterbart Orchestra at Pittsburgh's Old City Hall. and then appeared in concerts in Ohio from Fred A. Innes and his band.

In January 1891 Linde performed with baritone Giovanni Tagliapietra at Steinway Hall. Later that year she reunited with Campanini to perform in his Easter concert given at the Lenox Lyceum. In April 1891 she performed with the Grand Opera Orchestra and Chorus led by conductor John C. Mullaly at Boston Music Hall. She was a soloist in both Camille Saint-Saëns's Le Déluge and Haydn's Nelson Mass at the 1891 Pittsburgh May Festival with fellow vocalists Andreas Dippel, Emil Fischer, and Clementine de Vere Sapio. That same month she performed the role of Azucena in Giuseppe Verdi's Il trovatore at the Grand Opera House, Brooklyn with the Kruger Opera Company. She was seen again at that theatre the following month as the Queen of the Gypsies in The Bohemian Girl and Marthe Schwerlein in Faust. The following fall she toured the United States with violinist Franz Wilczek, Campanini, de Vere Sapio, and pianist Jacques Friedberger. In December 1891 she performed in a concert at Ford's Grand Opera House in Baltimore.

In the summer of 1892 Linde performed in a series of concerts led by Nahan Franko at the Eldorado Amusement Park, and performed with the Farini Opera Company in concerts in New Jersey and Connecticut. In September 1892 she gave a concert at the Collingwood Opera House with the band of the 21st Infantry Regiment. On October 10, 1892, she created the role of Marchioness Moya in the world premiere of Silas G. Pratt's The Triumph of Columbus at Carnegie Hall; a work composed for the quadricentennial of Columbus's discovery of the New World. In November 1892 she began performing with her own ensemble, the Rosa Linde Concert Company (RLCC), in New York. Members in the group included violinist Franz Wilczek, tenor Bernard Einsteine, and pianist Lucy Mawson. The RLCC toured in the 1892–1893 season for performances in Virginia, New Jersey, Delaware, Pennsylvania, Rhode Island, Ohio, Indiana, and Vermont.

In the Spring of 1893 Linde re-teamed with Patrick Gilmore to tour with his band. Also on the tour was Tagliapietra and violinist Lily Dolgorouky. This group performed in theaters in Maine, Rhode Island, Massachusetts, New Brunswick, Pennsylvania, and New York. In August and September 1893 she performed with John Philip Sousa and his band in concerts at Manhattan Beach. This was immediately followed by performances with Vladimir de Pachmann at the Worcester Music Festival. Later that year she was hired by Rudolph Aronson to tour with violinist Henri Marteau on his 1893–1894 American tour. Joining them was pianist Edwin M. Shonert. The tour began in November 1893 in Cincinnati, Ohio and encompassed stops in 50 American cities. In addition to performing as a chamber group, the tour also included performances with orchestras; among them the Buffalo Symphony Orchestra. The tour ended in Pittsburgh in April 1894.

In the summer of 1894 Linde was part of the American delegation to the Antwerp International Exposition; and was featured performer on a July 4 concert opening the American exhibit at that world's fair. Upon returning to the United States she reunited with Sousa for further performances in August 1894. In 1895 she toured as a member of Enrico Campobello's opera troupe as Azucena in Il trovatore and Nancy in Martha. In 1895–1896 she toured with violinist Rafael Díaz Albertini. She performed the role of Azucena for her first appearance with the Castle Square Opera Company at the Grand Opera House in Philadelphia in August 1896. After this she toured the Southern United States in concerts with Lillian Nordica and William H. Rieger.

In 1897 Linde performed performed with James Henry Mapleson's opera company in the roles of Lucia in Cavalleria rusticana at Stratford's Opera House in Brantford, Ontario, and Marta in Faust at the Taylor Opera House in New Jersey. That same year she toured with soprano and pianist Teresa Carreño. In 1897–1898 she toured with Fred A. Innes and his band. She portrayed Lucia again at Philadelphia's Academy of Music in April 1898 with Ferruccio Giannini as Turiddu. In 1899 she toured with soprano Emma Nevada. She was under contract with the Metropolitan Opera for the 1899–1900 season; although she never ended up performing in an opera with the company. However, she did perform in a concert conducted by Fritz Scheel at the Met on November 12, 1899; singing the aria "O don fatale" from Don Carlos among other repertoire.

== Later life and career ==
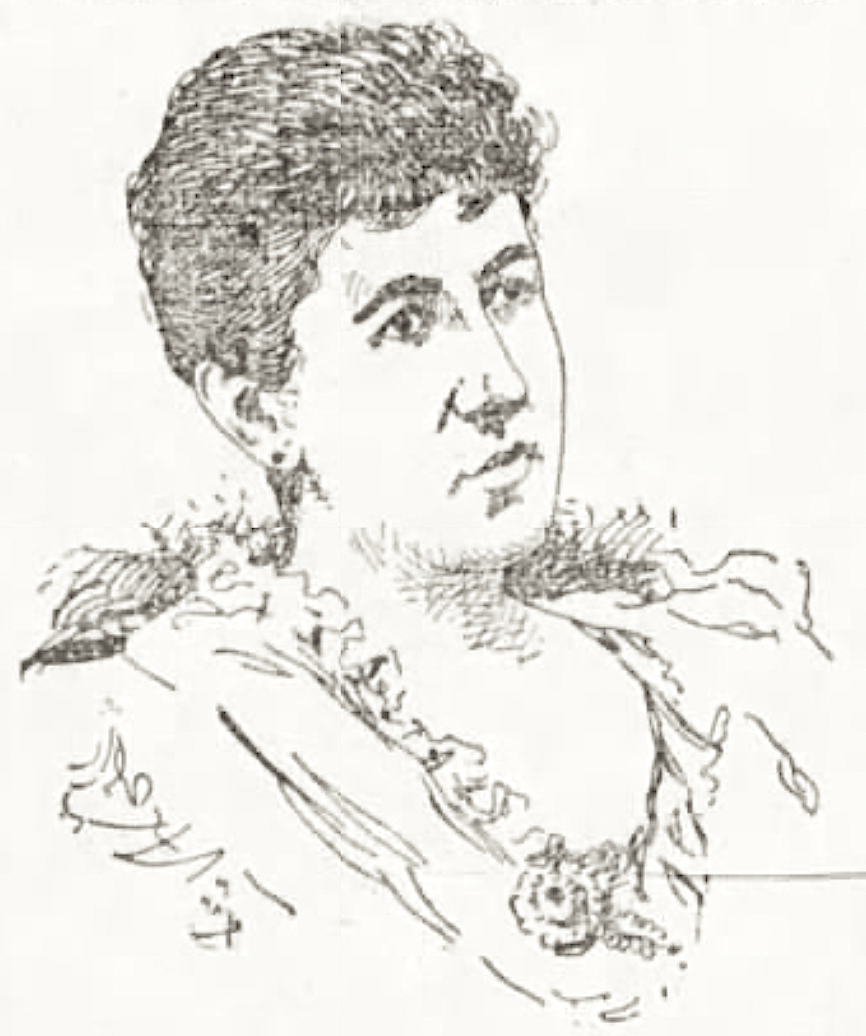
Sketch of Rosa Linde.

Linde continued to perform in concerts with Innes and his band in the early 1900s. In 1901 she sang with Buffalo Symphony Orchestra, and toured with the Slayton Grand Concert Company. She also appeared in concerts with her daughter in Buffalo that year. In 1902 she toured with the Brockway Grand Concert Company. In the years following she toured with her own concert company until as late as 1906.

On January 12, 1907, Linde gave a recital at Steinert Hall in Boston with pianist Joseph Maerz. She was heard in many other recitals that year in other cities in Massachusetts, New York, Maine, and Nova Scotia. In September and October 1907 she was one of the resident entertainers at the Jamestown Exposition. In 1908 she performed with the Adamowski Trio at the Bedford Theatre in Massachusetts, and was a soloist in Handel's Messiah with the Boston Symphony Orchestra and the Fall River Choral Society at the Academy of Music. She performed with the BSO again and the Lowell Choral Society that same year. In February 1909 she the featured soloist with the Lima Choral Society at Lima Memorial Hall. Later that year she toured Italy with composer Legrand Howland.

In May 1911 Linde performed in concert at the convention of the New York State Music Teachers Association. On December 15, 1911, she performed with organist Charles Gilbert Spross in a special concert at Broadway's New Amsterdam Theatre which introduced a newly installed pipe organ at the venue which was put in for the revival of Ben-Hur. Three days later she performed with the Volpe Symphony Orchestra at Carnegie Hall in a concert honoring composer Edward MacDowell on the anniversary of MacDowell birthday.

After 1911 Linde's performances became infrequent. In 1913 she sang in a vocal quartet with her daughter at a concert given in St. Luke's Episcopal Church in Gladstone, New Jersey. In 1916 she performed in a concert at St. Joseph's Orphan Asylum in Manhattan. In 1919 she performed with violinist Henri Marteau at the Lyceum Theatre in Minneapolis. She offered master classes in New York in the summer of 1921. She also taught singing privately in New Jersey.

She died in Gladstone, New Jersey on September 3, 1921.

She made recordings with Columbia Records in 1906 and 1911.
