= Violin Concerto No. 2 (Bruch) =

1877 concerto by Max Bruch

Violin Concerto
- by Max Bruch
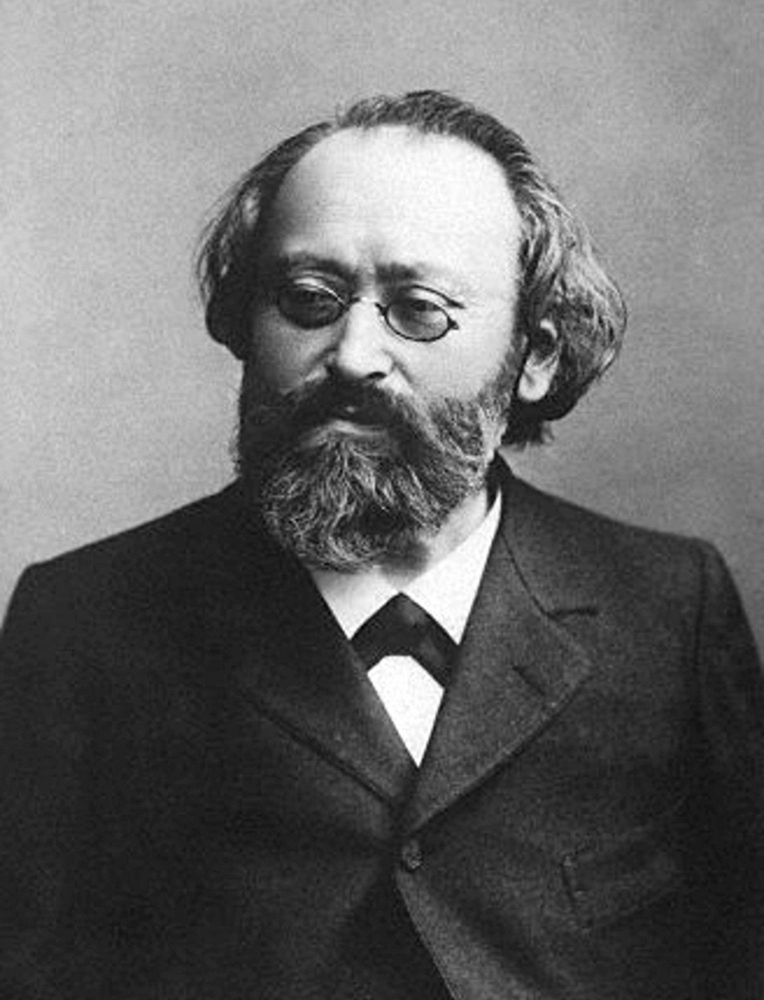
- Key: D minor
- Opus: 44
- Period: Romantic
- Genre: Concerto
- Composed: 1877
- Movements: 3
- Scoring: Violin & Orchestra

Premiere
- Date: November 1877
- Location: London

Max Bruch's Violin Concerto No. 2 in D minor, Op. 44 was composed during 1877, following a failed attempt in 1874, and dedicated to the great Spanish violinist, Pablo de Sarasate. It was premiered in London by Sarasate, conducted by Bruch, on 4 November 1877.

== Structure ==
External audio
- Performed by Salvatore Accardo with the Leipzig Gewandhaus Orchestra under Kurt Masur
- I. Adagio non troppo
- II. Recitativo
- III. Finale (Allegro molto)

The concerto has three movements:

1. Adagio ma non troppo (D minor, ending in D major)
2. Recitativo: Allegro moderato (B♭ major) (attacca)
3. Finale: Allegro molto (B♭ major – D major)

A typical performance runs 28 to 30 minutes.
