= Sinbad (1891 musical) =

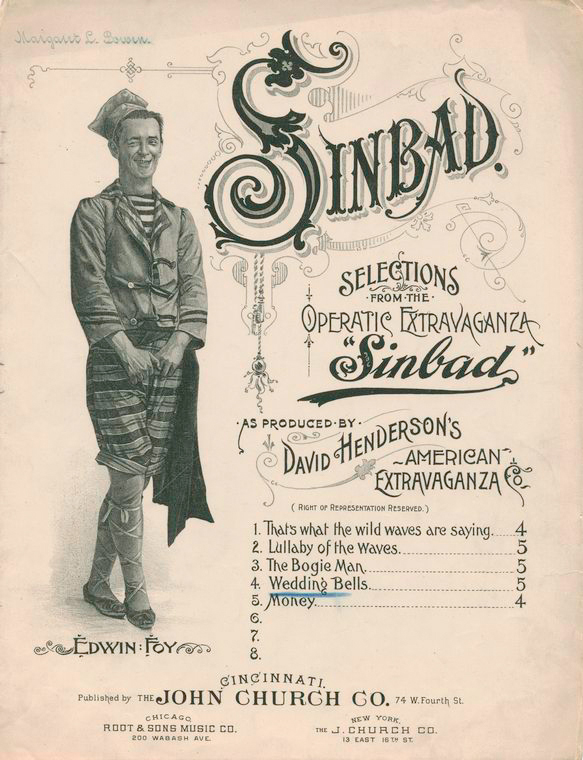
Sheet music for Wedding Bells with Eddie Foy on the cover, 1891

Sinbad or The Maid of Balsora is a musical with music composed by W. H. Batchelor and a book and lyrics by Harry B. Smith.

The original production opened on June 11, 1891, in Chicago and starred Eddie Foy. It was produced by David Henderson, whose company was then known as the American Extravaganza Company.

== Original cast ==
In order of appearance:

- Fanny Ward as Cupid
- Ida Mulle as Ninetta
- Louise Eissing as Sinbad
- Harry Norman as Snarleyow
- Herbert Gresham as Count Spaghetti
- Fanny Duball as School mistress
- Eddie Foy as Fresco
- Arthur Dunn as Old Man of the Sea

- Martha Irmler was also in the production as a principal dancer.

== Songs ==
- "He Never Came Back"
- "That's What The Wild Waves Are Saying"
- "Money"
- "Lullaby of the Waves"
- "The Bogie Man"
- "The Sights That I Saw On The Big Ferris Wheel"
- "Wedding Bells"
- "Oh! What a Diff'rence in the Morning" (interpolated by Frank Norman)
- "'Adieu' Said Marjorie" (Note: This song is copyright 1893 and was probably a later interpolation by cast member Henry Norman.)
