= Martha Irmler =

German ballet dancer

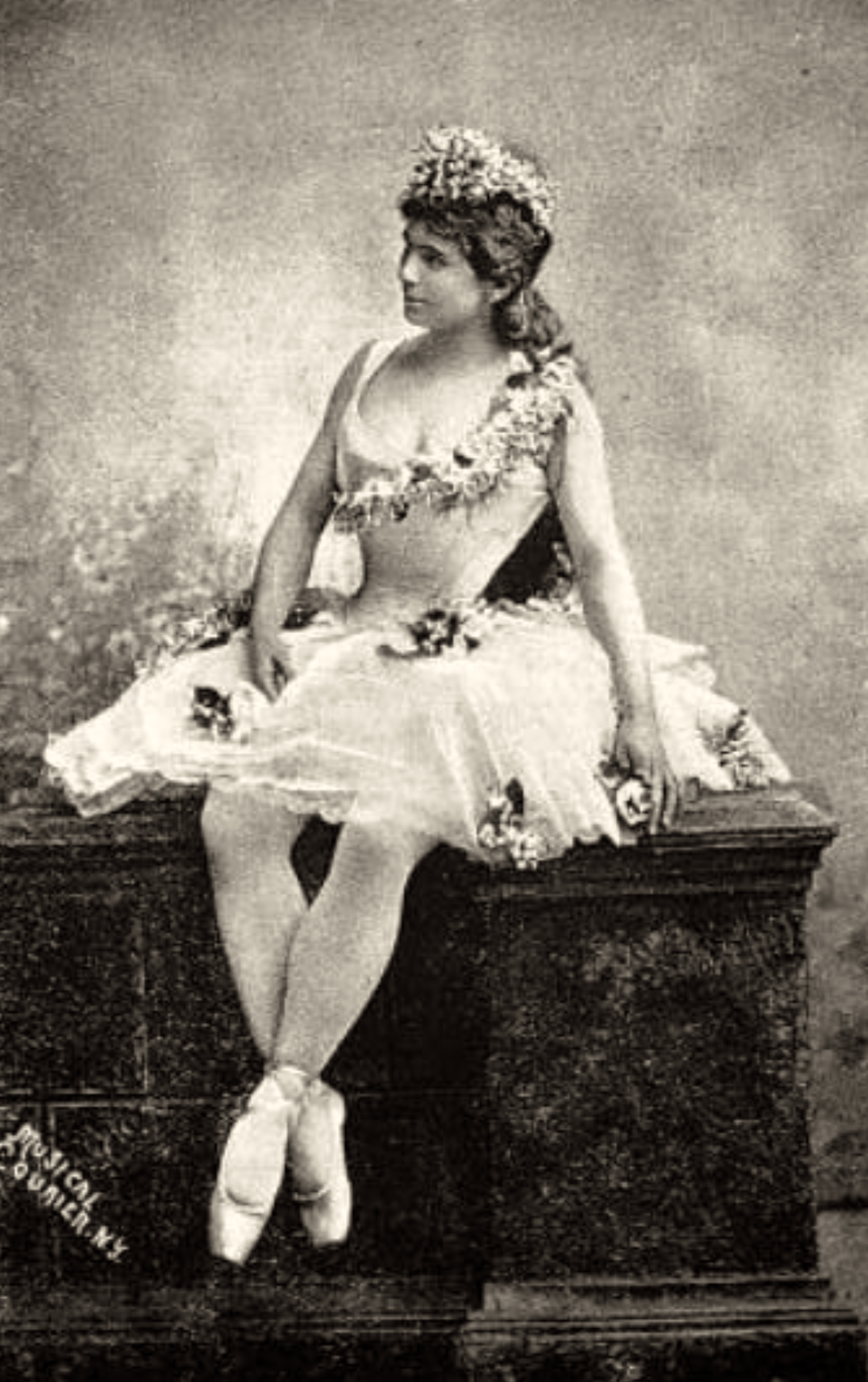
Martha Irmler

Martha Irmler was a German ballet dancer active on the stage during the late 19th century. She began her career at the Semperoper in Dresden where she trained as a dancer from ages 4 to 17. She made her debut as principal dancer at that theatre when she was 15, and subsequently performed in European theaters as a principal dancer during the late 1880s. She had an active career in the United States and England during the 1890s. With the American Extravaganza Company she toured the United States in the musicals Alladin, Jr. (1890), The Crystal Slipper (1891), Sinbad (1891–1892, 1894), and Ali Baba and the Forty Thieves (1892–1893). She was prima ballerina of the Metropolitan Opera in 1891–1892 and again in 1896–1897. In 1895–1896 she was prima ballerina at the Empire Theatre, Leicester Square, London. She married in South Africa, and was living there at the time her marriage was reported in the press in July 1900.

== Life and career ==
The daughter of German ballet dancer and teacher Gustav Irmler, Martha Irmler was born in Dresden, Germany, where her father worked as director of the school of ballet at the Semperoper. She began her training as a ballet dancer in that school at the age of four. She danced with that company until she was 17 years old; making her first appearance as a principal dancer at the Semperoper when she was 15. She also performed as a principal dancer in ballets in theaters in Hamburg, St. Petersburg, Cologne, Amsterdam, and Berlin prior to coming to America.

From Europe Irmler came to the United States to work in Chicago for producer David Henderson and his American Extravaganza Company (AEC). In 1890 she was a featured dancer in Aladdin, Jr. with the AEC. She was appointed prima ballerina of the Metropolitan Opera for the 1890–1891 season. On January 9, 1891 she was a featured dancer in the United States premiere of the opera Diana von Solange which was created by the German prince Ernst II of Saxe-Coburg-Gotha. Other operas she performed in at the Metropolitan Opera House that season included L'Africaine and Carmen. She also performed in the ballet Dresden China at the Met with the musical forces led by Frank Damrosch. It was choreographed by Augusto Francioli as a starring vehicle for her.

After the close of the Met's season she rejoined the AEC as the prima ballerina in The Crystal Slipper which toured to the Grand Opera House in St. Paul, the Chicago Opera House (COH) and the Grand Opera House in St. Louis in 1891. This was followed by work as the principal dancer in Sinbad which began its life at the COH. It then toured to the Baldwin Theatre in San Francisco where Irmler had a rivalry with dancer Clara Qualitz as to whom would lead the ballet. She continued to tour nationally in Sinbad in 1892. In May 1892 she was a principal dancer in another original musical produced by Henderson for the AEC, Ali Baba and the Forty Thieves. She toured the United States in this show in 1892–1893. In 1894 she was once again touring with the AEC in Sinbad.

In 1895 Irmler succeeded Lidia Nelidova as the prima ballerina at the Empire Theatre, Leicester Square, London. At that theatre the divertissement La Danse was choreographed for her by Katti Lanner. It premiered at the Empire on January 25, 1896. In one sequence in this ballet Irmler portrayed the Swedish ballet dancer Marie Taglioni dancing Jules Perrot's Pas de Quatre. She returned to the Metropolitan Opera in the 1896–1897 season; beginning with performances in the opera Les Huguenots in November 1896. Other operas she performed in at the Met included Le Cid and Martha. Her final performance with the Metropolitan Opera was on tour to Boston in Martha on April 9, 1897. Her younger sister Hulda Irmler was also a ballet dancer who had a career at the Met beginning in 1898.

In November 1897 Irmler toured to South Africa as a dancer in Frank Fillis's circus. It was reported in the Chicago Inter Ocean that she was working as a ballet dancer there in 1898. In July 1900 it was reported in the American press that Irmler had married a wealthy man in South Africa, and was residing in that country.

A photograph of Irmler issued by the Kinney Brothers Tobacco Company as a means to advertise Sweet Caporal Cigarettes is in the collection at the Metropolitan Museum of Art.
