= John Friedrich (luthier) =

German-born violin maker (1858 - 1943)

John Friedrich (1858–1943) was a German-born violin maker who worked in the United States.

== Biography ==
Friedrich was born 26 June 1858 at Kassel. He was a pupil of Oswald Möckel, a prominent German violin maker and repairer. Friedrich came to the United States in 1883, and in a short time ranked among the American leaders in his profession. His older brother William (1855–1911) joined him soon and they established the company "Friedrich, John, & Bro." on 5th Avenue in New York City. In addition to violins, Friedrich also made bows, violas, and violoncellos. He received the highest award bestowed for violins, violas, and violoncellos at the World's Columbian Exposition, Chicago, 1893. One of his violins was also granted the highest awards, Grand Prize and gold medal, at the St Louis World's Exposition in 1904. Another one of his violins was used by the concert violinist Franz Wilczek.

Friederich became known among collectors as an expert in the identification and valuation of rare instruments. In the early 1900s, four of the choicest specimens of his violins were in the possession of Frank Waldo, of Cambridge, Massachusetts. He married the Kassel native Emma Brenzel (1869–1950), with whom he had one daughter. Friedrich died July 8, 1943, in Peekskill, New York, and is interred with his wife at Cortlandt Manor, New York.
