= Diana von Solange =

1858 opera by Ernst II of Saxe-Coburg-Gotha

- Opera by Ernst II of Saxe-Coburg-Gotha
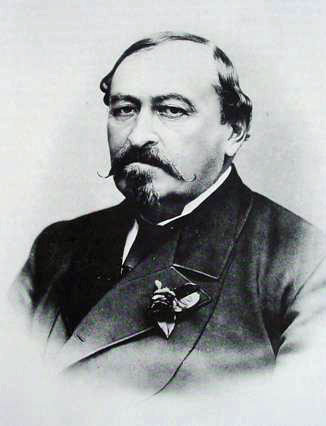
- The Composer
- Librettist: Otto Prechtler
- Language: German
- Premiere: 1858

Diana von Solange is an opera by the German prince Ernst II of Saxe-Coburg-Gotha, an amateur composer. It was premiered in 1858. In 1859, Franz Liszt wrote an orchestral Festmarsch nach Motiven von E. H. z. S-C-G, S.116, based on themes from Diana von Solange (E. H. z. S-C-G was short for Ernst Herzog zu Sachsen-Coburg-Gotha).

It received a brief appearance at the Metropolitan Opera (the 'Old Met') in New York City in 1891. The opera was one of three novelties introduced for the 1890–91 season by the Metropolitan's general manager, Edmund C. Stanton; the others were Asrael by Alberto Franchetti, which opened the season on November 26, and Antonio Smareglia's Il vassallo di Szigeth. Both were poorly received. Diana von Solange, the last of the three, was first shown on January 9, 1891; the performance marked its American premiere. Pauline Schöller-Haag sang the title role to the Armand of Andreas Dippel. Marie Jahn, Conrad Behrens, Juan Luria, Edmund Müller, and Bruno Lurgenstein rounded out the cast, under the direction of Anton Seidl. The opera also contained a ballet, which was singled out for praise by the New York World. The ballet was led by prima ballerina Martha Irmler.

Reviews of the opera were almost all negative; one writer described the piece as "simply rubbish", while others derisively referred to it as "Diana von So-Langweilig" (so boring). Another critic predicted that the work would not last three performances in the house; in the event, it lasted two. When it was discovered that a third outing was intended on January 12, a petition, bearing three hundred signatures and demanding that the opera be removed from the repertory, was delivered to the management, who hastily replaced it with Fidelio. Diana von Solange marked the final blow against Stanton; two days after the cancelled third performance, on January 14, it was announced that he was to be replaced by Henry Eugene Abbey for the following season.

Many critics wondered why, given its pedigree, its age, and its relative obscurity, Diana von Solange was even considered for performance by the Metropolitan. Although it was never proven, many critics suspected that Stanton and others in the company were motivated by the Duke's known "lavishness ... in the distribution of orders, especially among musicians". The general manager and other executives were believed to have in fact received such decorations, but were reportedly too ashamed of the whole debacle to be seen in public wearing them. However, Louis Auchincloss, Stanton's grand-nephew, suggests Stanton wanted to honor the Duke as a fellow admirer of Richard Wagner, to whom Ernest II had considered dedicating the opera.

Despite the opera's poor reception, Andreas Dippel was singled out for praise by numerous critics; this, coupled with his other successes during the season, led to his being retained on the company's roster for the following year.
