= Otto Prechtler =

Austrian civil servant, poet, dramatist and librettist (1813–1881)

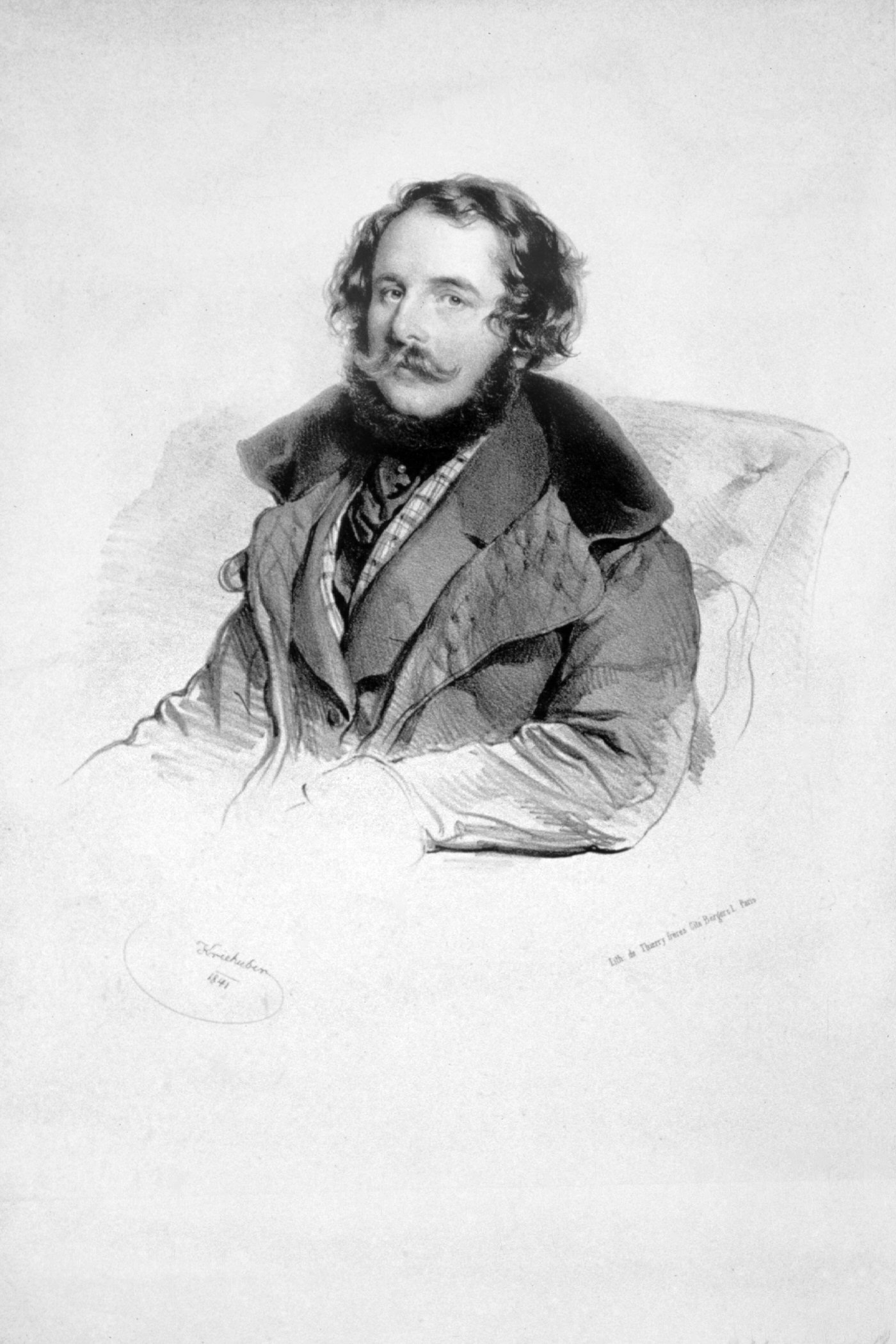
Lithograph of Prechtler by Josef Kriehuber (1841)

Johann Otto Prechtler (21 January 1813 – 6 August 1881) was an Austrian civil servant, and a poet, dramatist and librettist.

== Life ==
Prechtler was born in Grieskirchen, Upper Austria in modest circumstances; his mother Marie was a poet, and had some stage plays performed at a festival in Salzburg. Otto Prechtler studied in Linz and Vienna, and in 1834 he became a civil servant at the General Court Chamber (Allgemeine Hofkammer) in Vienna. In 1856 he succeeded Franz Grillparzer as director of the Hofkammer archives, remaining in the post until 1866.

=== Literary works ===
From 1833 he published poetry in the Linzer Bürgerblatt, and novellas and travel writings in almanacs and magazines. From 1842 to 1867 he had several plays performed in Vienna at the Burgtheater; particularly successful were Die Kronenwächte (1844) and Falconiere (1846). Many of his works are said to show the influence of Grillparzer.

He wrote more than thirty libretti, including the libretto for Josef Netzer's opera Mara, and for operas by Franz Lachner, Johann Hoven, Heinrich Proch and others; he wrote the libretto for Diana von Solange by Ernest II, Duke of Saxe-Coburg and Gotha. In 1849 he was editor of the newspaper Der Patriot, for which he also contributed material.

=== Retirement ===
In 1864 Prechtler was awarded an honorary citizenship of his birthplace Grieskirchen. He retired in 1866, and lived in various places in Upper Austria; he died in Innsbruck in 1881.
