= Edmund C. Stanton =

American opera and theatre manager

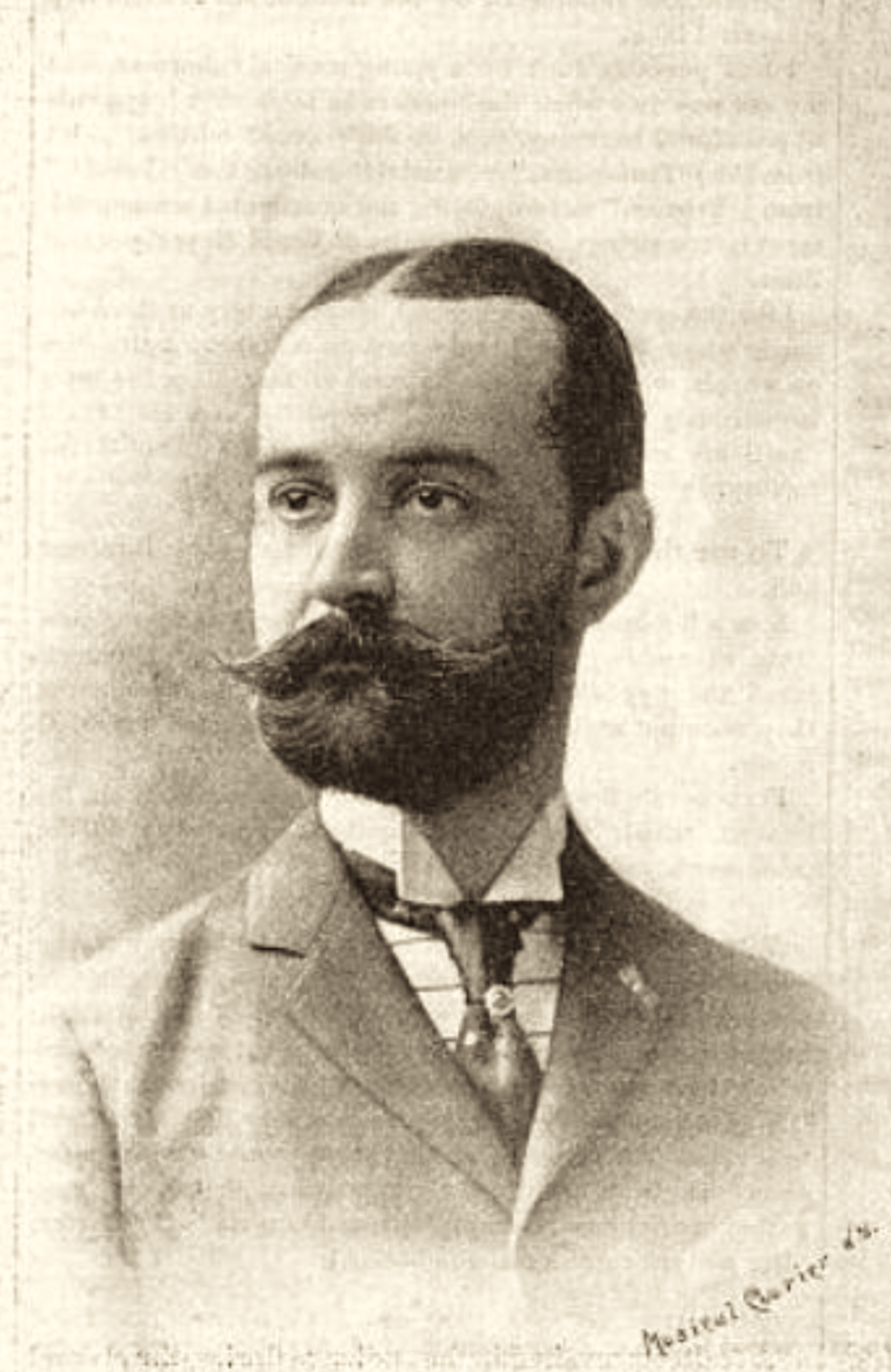

Edmund Courtland Stanton (5 August 1854 – 20 January 1901) was an American opera and theatre manager. Born into an affluent household, Stanton's family had ties to New York high society. He began his professional life in the insurance field in Manhattan during which time he became close friends with the Vanderbilt family who played a leading role in the establishment of the Metropolitan Opera ("the Met"). From 1883 to 1884 he served as the Secretary of the Board of the Met, and had an instrumental role in raising funds to complete the building of the Metropolitan Opera House.

After the sudden death of the Met's general director Leopold Damrosch in 1885, Stanton was named as his successor, serving in that capacity from 1885 to 1891. His six-season tenure was marked by a focus on German opera, during which time the company presented the first American performances of several operas by Richard Wagner, including the first United States performance of the complete Ring Cycle. After a disastrous 1890–1891 season, he lost the confidence of the Met's stockholders and was fired from his position.

Stanton formed a partnership with theatrical manager A. M. Palmer with whom he co-managed Broadway's Garden Theatre from 1893 through 1896. This latter venture proved financially detrimental, and he subsequently moved with his family to England where the cost of living was significantly cheaper. His latter life was marked by increasing financial problems exacerbated by his struggle with alcoholism. He died in poverty at the age of 47.

== Early life and career ==
The son of Edmund Denison Stanton and his wife Louise Babcock, Edmund Courtland Stanton was born on 5 August 1854 in Stonington, Connecticut. His father was Daniel Drew's stock broker, and the family, while not enormously wealthy, was affluent. His father died of a ruptured appendix during his childhood, and the family lived a gentrified existence at their home in Stonington.

As a young adult, Edmund made a living working in insurance in Manhattan. Both he and his brother were members of the Calumet Club of New York and resided at the club's premises in the East Side of Manhattan. Edmund became a close friend of the Vanderbilt family, and was well known among New York society. According to his great nephew, the writer and historian Louis Auchincloss, Stanton family legend holds that there may have been a romance between Edmund and Florence Vanderbilt, but there is no evidence to substantiate this. In 1877 he was a founding member of the Westminster Kennel Club.

== Early years at Metropolitan Opera ==
The Metropolitan Opera ("the Met") was established in 1883, largely through efforts spearheaded by William Henry Vanderbilt. One of the other principal backers of the Met, George Henry Warren, was Edmund's cousin through marriage to his mother's niece. Stanton's pre-existing relationship with the Vanderbilts and the other principal backers of the Met during its genesis led him to be appointed as the Secretary of the Board of the newly established opera organization. He was appointed to that role before the opening of the Metropolitan Opera House, and his first task in that position was to raise $350,000 in bonds to finance the completion of that opera house. Prior to the official opening, he gave a tour of the newly built theatre to reporters on July 21, 1883.

The Met was leased by Henry Eugene Abbey during its first season, but the board parted ways with Abbey after he demanded that that they shoulder his financial losses incurred during his first season and underwrite future losses during its second. Stanton played a leading role in the search for a new general director, and oversaw difficult contractual negotiations with English opera manager Herbert F. Gye (son of Frederick Gye), which fell apart after much deliberation .

Conductor Leopold Damrosch, founder of the Oratorio Society of New York, was ultimately selected by the Met's board as the opera house's second general manager. Under Damrosch's leadership the company switched from a focus on Italian opera to German opera, and the second season at the Met began on November 17, 1884, with a production of Richard Wagner's Tannhäuser with Damrosch conducting.

== Leading the Met ==
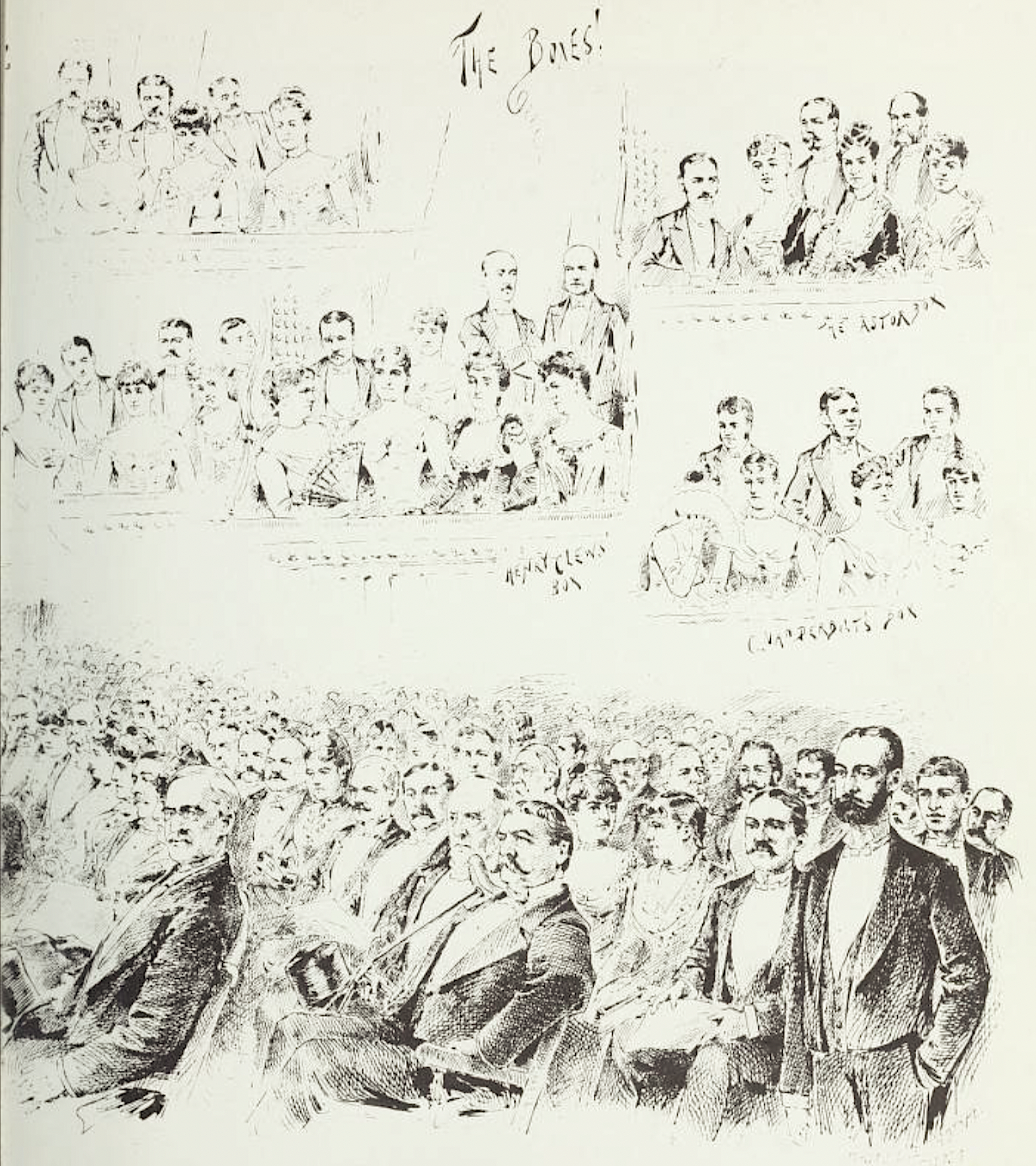
Sketch of the audience at the Metropolitan Opera House on November 30, 1888 for a performance of Lohengrin. Stanton is depicted standing at the bottom right corner of the image.

On February 15, 1885, Damrosch died suddenly and unexpectedly in the midst of this second opera season. The Met's board quickly turned to Stanton to replace him as the opera house's general director. Conductor Anton Seidl served as principal conductor of the Met following Damrosch's death with Leopold's son Walter Damrosch serving as second conductor under Seidl. All of them answered to Stanton who was given veto power over all decisions by the Met's board.

Stanton believed in a repertory ensemble approach to casting in which resident artists performed the opera repertoire rather than bringing in stars from outside the company to fill the leading roles. He continued Leopold Damrosch's vision of keeping opera sung in German as the central focus of the Met's repertory, and continued to fill the Met's roster of resident singers with German-speaking performers from Europe. The singers who were a part of the Met's resident company under Stanton included tenors Max Alvary and Andreas Dippel, contralto Marianne Brandt, baritones Adolf Robinson and Joseph Beck, bass Emil Fischer, and sopranos Sophie Traubmann and Lilli Lehmann, the latter of whom was the company's prima donna. Other singers he brought to America included sopranos Olga Islar and Marie Jahn. While possessing no experience leading an opera company, Stanton managed to earn the admiration of the company's employees. In a letter dated January 1, 1886, Lehmann wrote, "Mr. Stanton, our director, is a gentleman all over. Every individual member, from the soloist down to the last workman, loves and respects him."

The majority of operas performed by the Met during Stanton's tenure were German operas. Even when the company performed operas that were originally written in other languages like Italian or French, the company performed them in German. On March 3, 1886, the company gave the first performance in New York of Wagner's Parsifal which was presented in a concert version. The company presented staged versions of the United States premieres of multiple operas by Wagner during Stanton's tenure with Seidl conducting the first American performances of Die Meistersinger von Nürnberg (1886), Tristan Und Isolde (1886), Siegfried (1887), Götterdämmerung (1888), and Das Rheingold (1889). The team of Stanton, Seidl, and Damrosch also presented the first American performance of Wagner's complete Ring Cycle.

Other United States premieres presented during Stanton's tenure included Karl Goldmark's Die Königin von Saba (1885), Ignaz Brüll's Das goldene Kreuz (1886), Goldmark's Merlin (1887), Viktor Nessler's Der Trompeter von Säckingen (1887), Carl Maria von Weber's Euryanthe (1887), Gaspare Spontini's Fernand Cortez (1888), Peter Cornelius's Der Barbier von Bagdad (1890), Alberto Franchetti's Asrael (1890), and Antonio Smareglia's Il Vassalo di Szigeth (1890).

The 1890–1891 season was fraught with difficulties for Stanton who was losing the confidence of the Met's stockholders and governing board. Additionally, audiences were growing tired of the German repertory, and there was opposition to Stanton's organizing design of a resident German company. In January 1891 the company staged the United States premiere of German prince Ernst II of Saxe-Coburg-Gotha's Diana von Solange to disastrous results. Following this a decision was made by the Met's board on January 14, 1891, to remove Stanton from his position and turn the management of the organization over to the theatre management firm of Abbey, Schoeffel and Grau.

== Later life ==
On a visit to Europe while still at the Met, Stanton heard the Vienna Conservatory-trained violin prodigy Fritz Kreisler, and subsequently organized a concert tour of the United States featuring the 13-year-old violinist. Kreisler gave a total of 50 performances during this 1888 tour, which launched his career.

After his tenure at the Met, Stanton formed a partnership with the theatrical manager A. M. Palmer which ultimately proved unsuccessful and was financially disastrous. Together they co-managed Broadway's Garden Theatre from 1893 until 1896 when they were succeeded by Charles Frohman. Financial hardship prompted Stanton to move with his wife, Mary Stanton (née Lane), and their two sons to Europe where the cost of living was significantly less. They ultimately settling in Bournemouth, England. There he found it difficult to find work, and lapsed into alcoholism.

Edward C. Stanton died on January 20, 1901, in Bournemouth. Just 47 years old, he was financially destitute at the time of his death.
