= Olga Islar =

German soprano

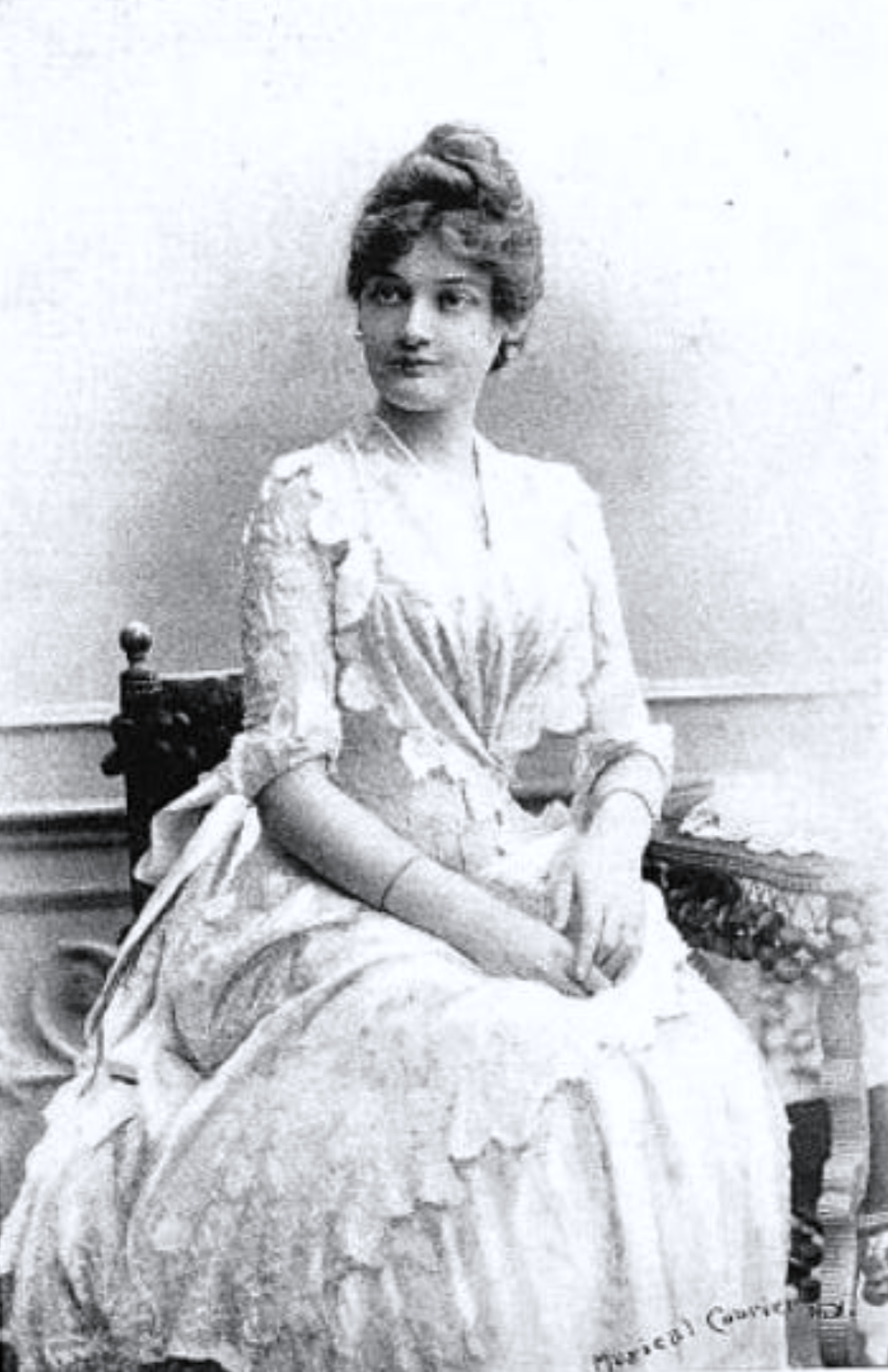
Olga Islar in 1890

Maria Olga Islar, known on the stage as Olga Islar, (7 January 1865 – 24 September 1944) was a German soprano who predominantly performed roles from the soubrette and lyric soprano repertoire. She began her career in 1887 at the Staatsoper Hannover and then came to the Metropolitan Opera in New York City for the 1890-1891 season. She performed in a season of opera in Philadelphia in 1891 led by Gustav Hinrichs, and then toured the United States as a member of Minnie Hauk's opera company. She returned to Germany where she was active in opera houses until 1895 when she joined the New German Theatre (now the State Opera) in Prague. She performed there for three years and then returned to Germany where she performed as a member of first the Leipzig Opera (1898-1900) and then Landestheater Coburg (1901-1904). In her later life she lived in Vienna, Austria. Of Jewish ancestry, she was arrested and sent to the Theresienstadt Ghetto in 1944 during The Holocaust of World War II. She was murdered there on 24 September 1944.

== Early life and career ==
Born to Jewish parents, Maria Olga Islar was born in Germany on 7 January 1865. She made her opera debut at the Staatsoper Hannover 1887 where she was a principal artist through 1889. She was then committed to the Opernhaus Düsseldorf (1889-1890). In April 1899 she traveled to London to perform at The Athenaeum, Camden Road in a concert organized by Arthur Wallen. She performed in a concert with the Chaplin Trio at Prince's Hall in Piccadilly in June 1889. She performed a concert with the American tenor Rechab Tandy at The Crystal Palace (CP) that same month, and returned to the CP in July 1889 to perform in concert with English tenor Edward Branscombe under conductor August Manns.

== Work in the United States ==
Islar was a principal soprano at the Metropolitan Opera ("Met") in New York City in 1890-1891. She was hired by the Met's director Edmund C. Stanton. Her American debut was in the Met's production of Richard Wagner's Tannhäuser on November 28, 1890. In reviewing her portrayal of the Shepherd Boy in this opera, The New York Times stated that Islar had "a light and pretty voice, and she phrased her measures commendably." Her other repertoire at the Met included Marzelline in Ludwig van Beethoven's Fidelio and Urbain in Giacomo Meyerbeer's Les Huguenots. The New York World found her portrayal of the page in Les Huguenots "charming" and remarked that she "sang well". The American press also remarked on her short stature; describing her as a "diminutive person". In December 1890 she performed in a benefit concert given at the Met for the Young Men's Hebrew Association.

In April 1891 Islar performed with the Metropolitan Opera Orchestra in a concert at the Lenox Lyceum led by Anton Seidl. That same month she performed a concert at Flatbush Tompkins Congregational Church in Brooklyn with tenor George Werrenrath, and appeared in a benefit concert for the composer and choral conductor C. Mortimer Wiske at the Brooklyn Academy of Music. In a review of the latter concert the critic of the Brooklyn Times-Union wrote the following:

"But there was one surprise for those who attended last evening; that was the new soprano, Miss Olga Islar, a comparative stranger among us. She is a young lady of extraordinary gifts. Her voice is almost the ideal soprano, of remarkable volume, compass, power, flexibility, expressiveness, and sweetness. Her methods and her execution showed that in her case the finest culture had been bestowed on the rarest genius."

Islar signed a contract beginning in May 1891 with American impresario L. M. Ruben to perform in his touring opera and concert company led by conductor Gustav Hinrichs. She first appeared with the company in a season of operas at the Grand Opera House in Philadelphia in the summer of 1891 which opened with Gioachino Rossini's William Tell in which she performed the part of Jemmy with Giuseppe Del Puente in the title role and Selma Kronold as Mathilde. In this season she also performed the title role of Léo Delibes's Lakmé with Oscar Saenger as Frédéric and Clara Poole as Mallika; Gilda in Giuseppe Verdi's Rigoletto with Del Puente in the title role and Payne Clarke as the Duke of Mantua; Elvire in Daniel Auber's Masaniello, and the title roles in Charles Gounod's Mireille, William Vincent Wallace's Maritana, and Gaetano Donizetti's Lucia di Lammermoor. The Philadelphia Inquirer described her as a "brilliant coloratura singer" who "triumphed in the difficult role of Lakmé". Other performances included appearances at Ford's Grand Opera House in Baltimore.

In August 1891 Islar signed a contract with the touring opera company led by Minnie Hauk. She was with the company when it began its tour at the Chicago Opera House in September 1891. When the company was in residence at the Orpheum Theatre in San Francisco in October 1891 she performed the role of Marguerite in Charles Gounod's Faust.

== Later life, career, and death ==
Islar returned to Germany where she was initially a resident artist with the Kroll Opera House and later Theater Bremen. She also performed at the opera house in Elberfeld. She was a principal soprano at the New German Theatre (now the State Opera) in Prague from 1895-1898, the Leipzig Opera from 1898-1900, and the Landestheater Coburg from 1901 to 1904. She also appeared as a guest artist at major opera houses in Germany and Austria. Other roles in her repertoire included Frau Fluth in Otto Nicolai's in The Merry Wives of Windsor, Gunda in Siegfried Wagner's Der Bärenhäuter, Marie in Albert Lortzing's Zar und Zimmermann, Marie in Donizetti's La fille du régiment, Zerlina in Auber's Fra Diavolo, and the title role in Ambroise Thomas's Mignon.

Islar also worked on the concert stage. In her later life she lived in Vienna, Austria. During World War II she was arrested and sent to the Theresienstadt Ghetto where she was murdered on September 24, 1944; a victim of The Holocaust.
