= Romance in A minor (Bruch) =

1874 composition by Max Bruch

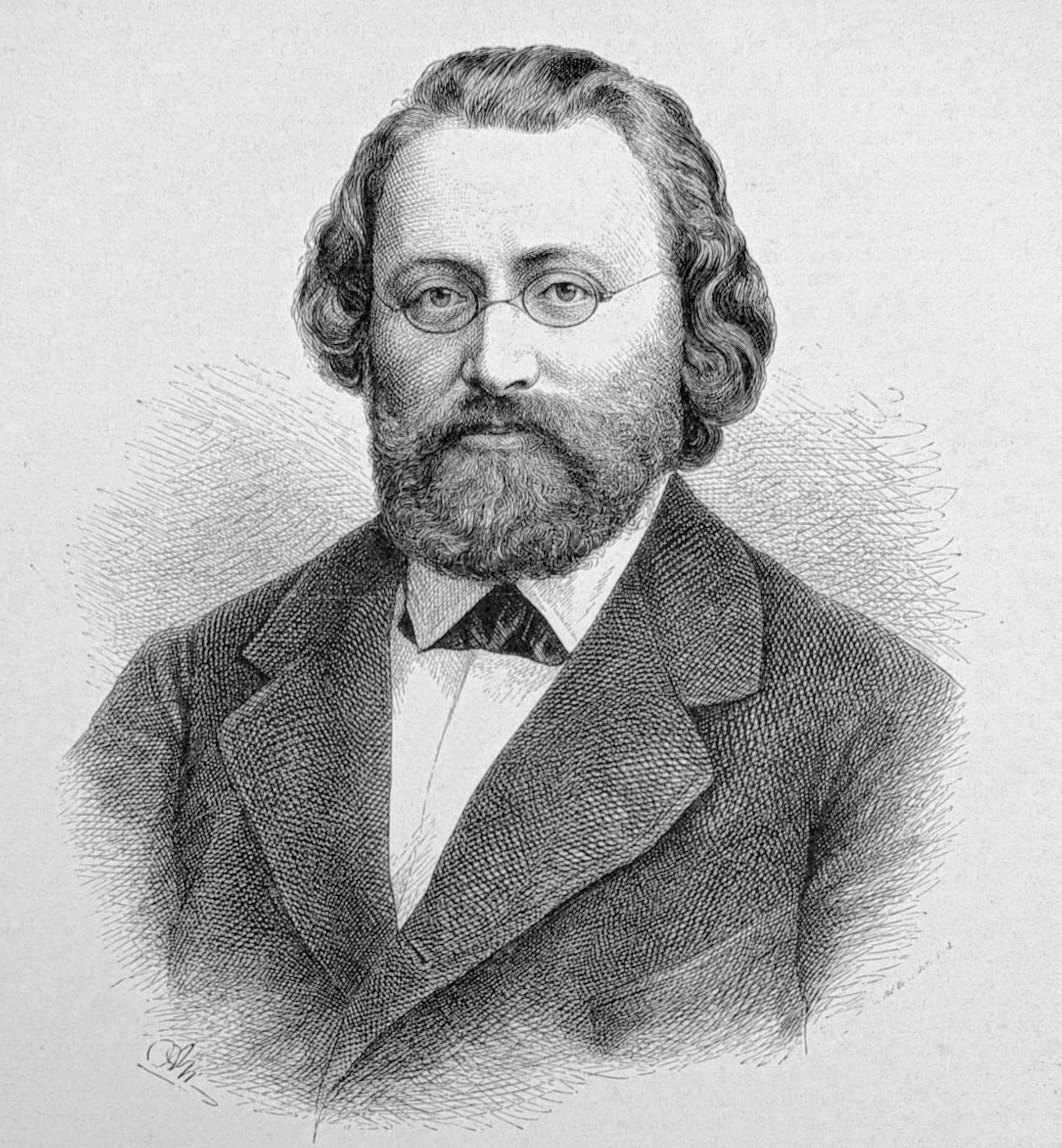
Max Bruch, 1881

Max Bruch's Romance for Violin and Orchestra in A minor, Op. 42, was composed in 1874. Bruch had intended the piece to form the first movement of a projected second violin concerto. (Note: Bruch eventually composed a completely different work for Pablo de Sarasate in 1877-78.) However the composer found himself unable to progress beyond the first movement and chose to publish the work as a standalone concert piece dedicated to violinist Robert Heckmann who along with Joseph Joachim had assisted Bruch with the violin part. (Note: Potter speculates that this decision may have affected the works reception as Joachim refused to perform it.)

== Background ==
Bruch started work on what he had planned to be his second violin concerto while preparing to conduct his choral work Odysseus: Szenen aus der Odyssee, Op. 41 in Cologne. By the 11th of February, he had completed the first movement and indicated to friends that he had beginnings of the projected second and third movements. However, perhaps due to personal issues, most notably a relationship with Amalie Heydweiller, which Christopher Fitfield speculates may have been the inspiration for the completed movement, Bruch found himself unable to complete the remaining movements. His decision to publish the work as a single movement concert piece, was based in part on the positive reception of his friends to the completed movement.

== Music ==
The romance is scored for solo violin and an orchestra comprising strings, 2 flutes, 2 oboes, 2 clarinets, 2 bassoons, 2 trumpets, 4 horns and timpani. It consists of a single movement marked Andante sostenuto. A typical performances last between 10 and 12 minutes.
