= Marie Jahn =

Austrian soprano

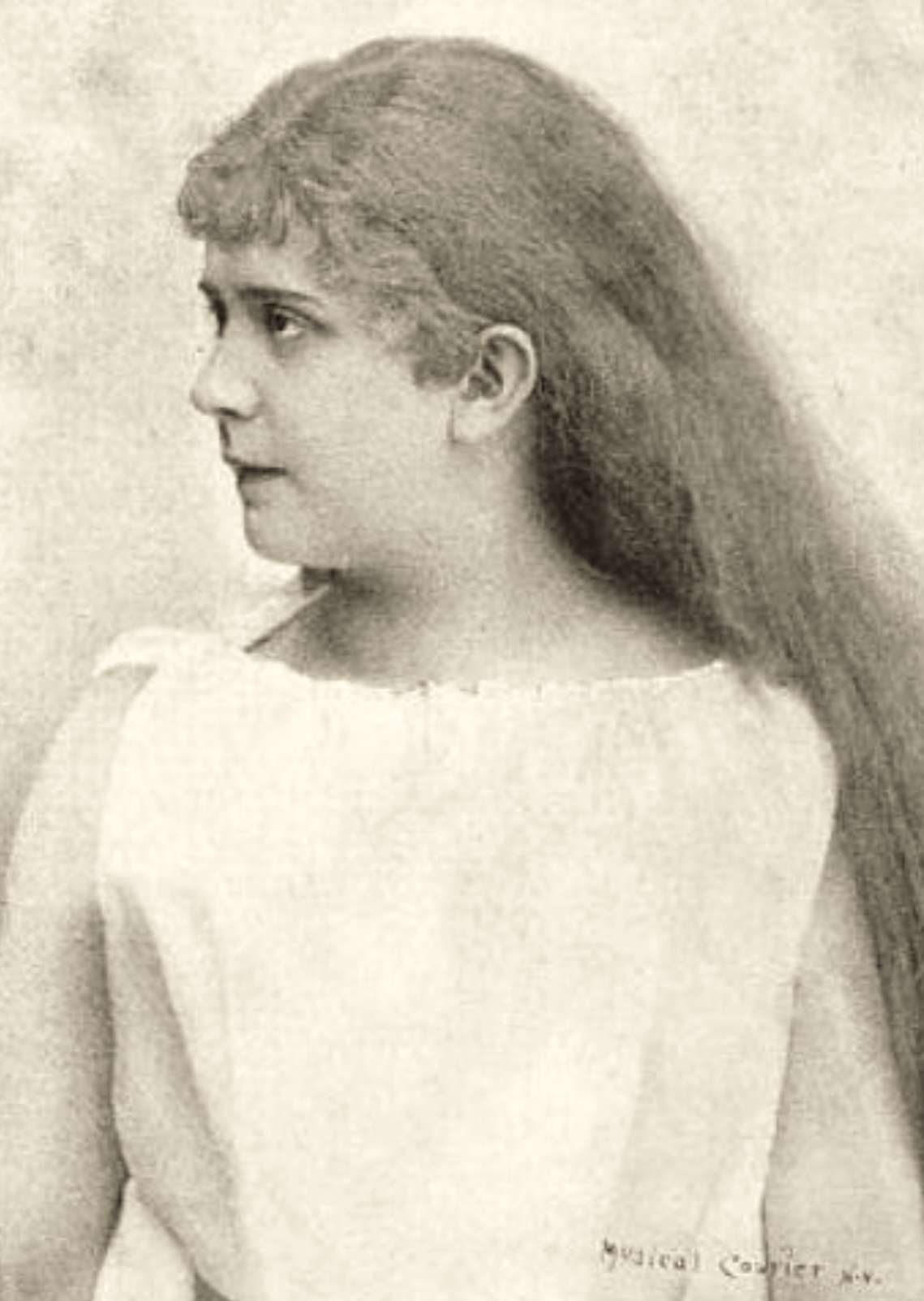
Marie Jahn in 1890

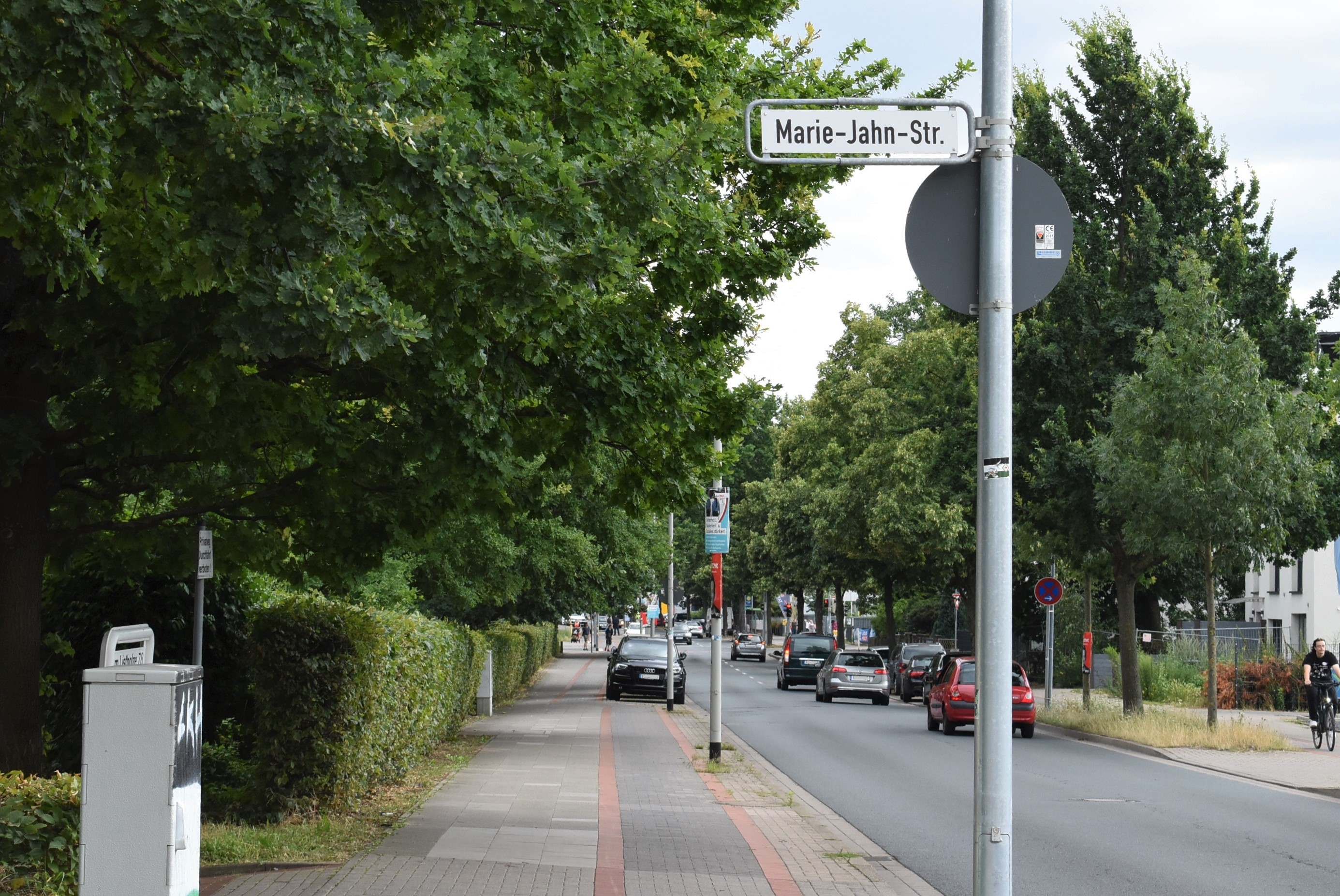
Marie Jahn Street in Hannover, Germany. It was named after the soprano in 2017.

Marie Jahn (18 February 1865 – 26 October 1934) was an Austrian soprano.

== Life and career ==
Marie Jahn was born in Vienna, Austria on 18 February 1865. She was trained as a soprano at the Vienna Conservatory (now the University of Music and Performing Arts Vienna). She made her professional debut as Alice in Giacomo Meyerbeer's Robert le diable at the Semperoper in Dresden in 1887. She was a resident artist at that theatre for three years.

In 1890 Jahne left Dresden to briefly join the Stadttheater Magdeburg before coming to America where she performed for one season in New York at the Metropolitan Opera ("Met") in 1890–1891. She made her debut at the Met on 26 November 1890 in the duo-role of Nefta/Suor Clotilde in the United States premiere of Alberto Franchetti's Asrael. This was followed by the roles of Venus in Tannhäuser (1890) and Elsa in Lohengrin (1890). In reviewing her performance in Asrael, The New York Times stated: "Fräulein Marie Jahn, the Nefta, has a very agreeable soprano voice. It is light, but not thin, fresh and unworn, sufficient in compass and delightfully smooth."

On January 9, 1891, Jahne performed the part of Katharine in the United States premiere of Diana von Solange at the Metropolitan Opera House. Other roles she performed at the Met in 1891 included Eva in Die Meistersinger von Nürnberg, Gutrune in Götterdämmerung, Micaëla in Carmen, and Sieglinde in Die Walküre.

Jahn was a principal soprano with the Staatsoper Hannover from 1891 to 1905. Her repertoire at that house included many roles in operas by Richard Wagner; among them Elisabeth in Tannhäuser, Elsa, and Senta in The Flying Dutchman. Other roles in her repertoire included Desdemona in Otello, Euridice in Orfeo ed Euridice, Micaëla, Pamina in The Magic Flute, and the title role in Euryanthe. Her final opera performance was in Hannover in 1905 as Wagner's Elisabeth. She also had a career as a concert soprano.

Jahn worked as a voice teacher in Hannover after her retirement from performance. She died there on 26 October 1934.
