= Andreas Dippel =

German opera singer

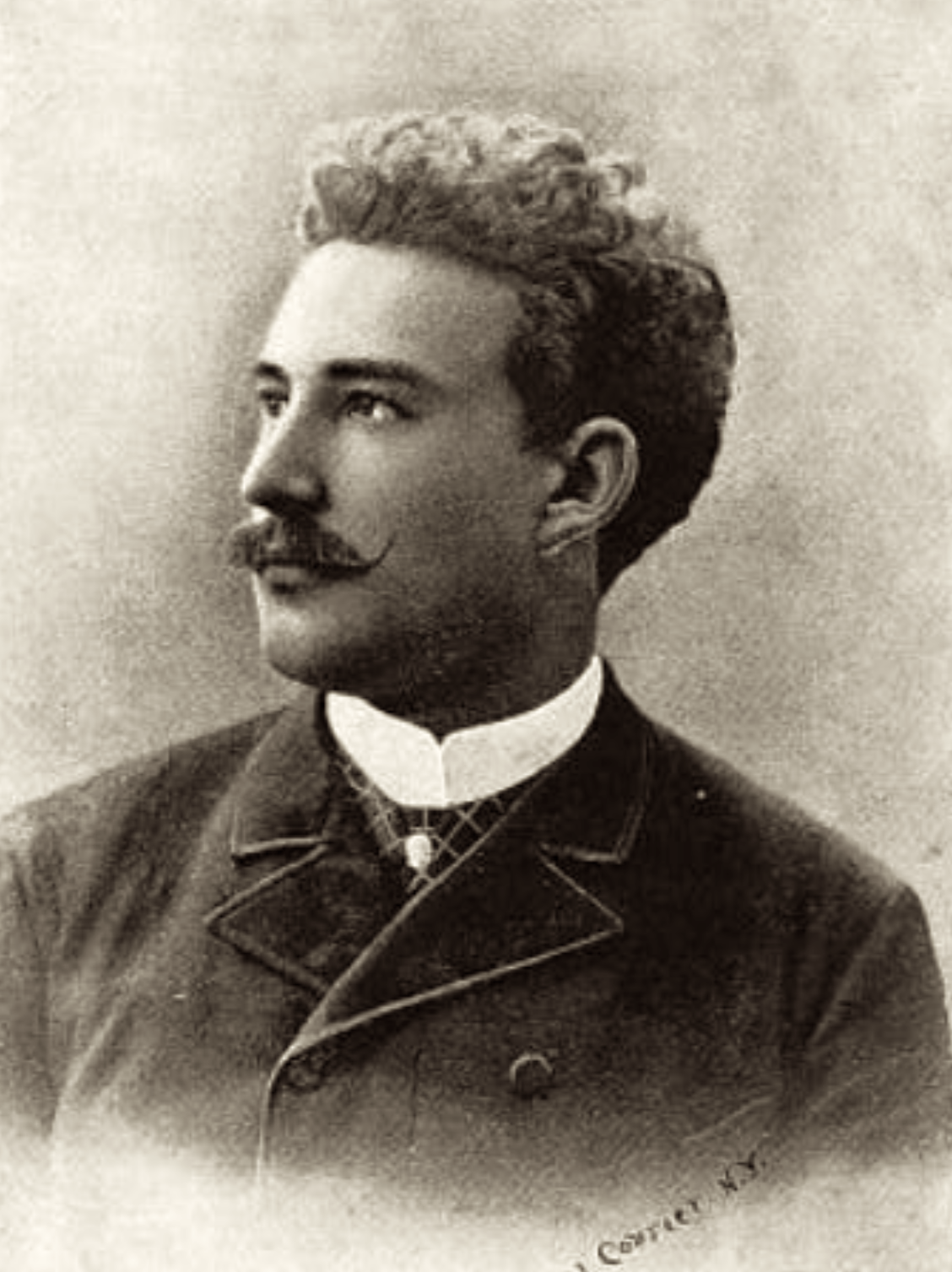
Andreas Dippel in 1890.

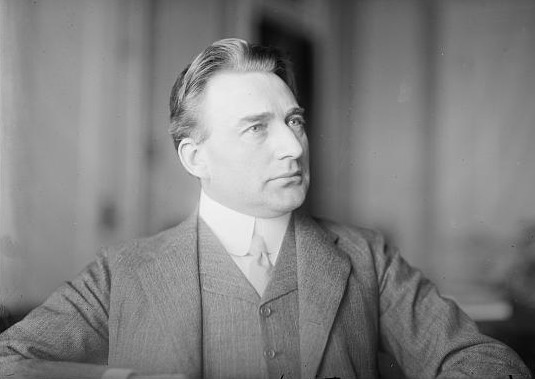
Andreas Dippel (1866–1932)

Andreas Dippel (30 November 1866 – 12 May 1932) was a German-born operatic tenor and impresario who from 1908 to 1910 was the joint manager (with Giulio Gatti-Casazza) of the New York Metropolitan Opera.

== Biography ==
Born Johann Andreas Dippel in Kassel, Grand Duchy of Hesse. He initially trained for a banking career there, but also studied singing. He made his stage debut in 1887 at the Bremen Stadttheater as Lionel in Flotow's opera Martha and continued to study singing with Julius Hey (Berlin), Alberto Leoni (Milan) and Johann Ress (Vienna). He sang several smaller roles in Bayreuth in 1889, and become a member of the Vienna State Opera in 1893. He sang there until 1898 in 27 roles, including Marcello in the Vienna premiere of Leoncavallo's La bohème. During that period he also sang in London's Royal Opera House and at the New York Metropolitan Opera.

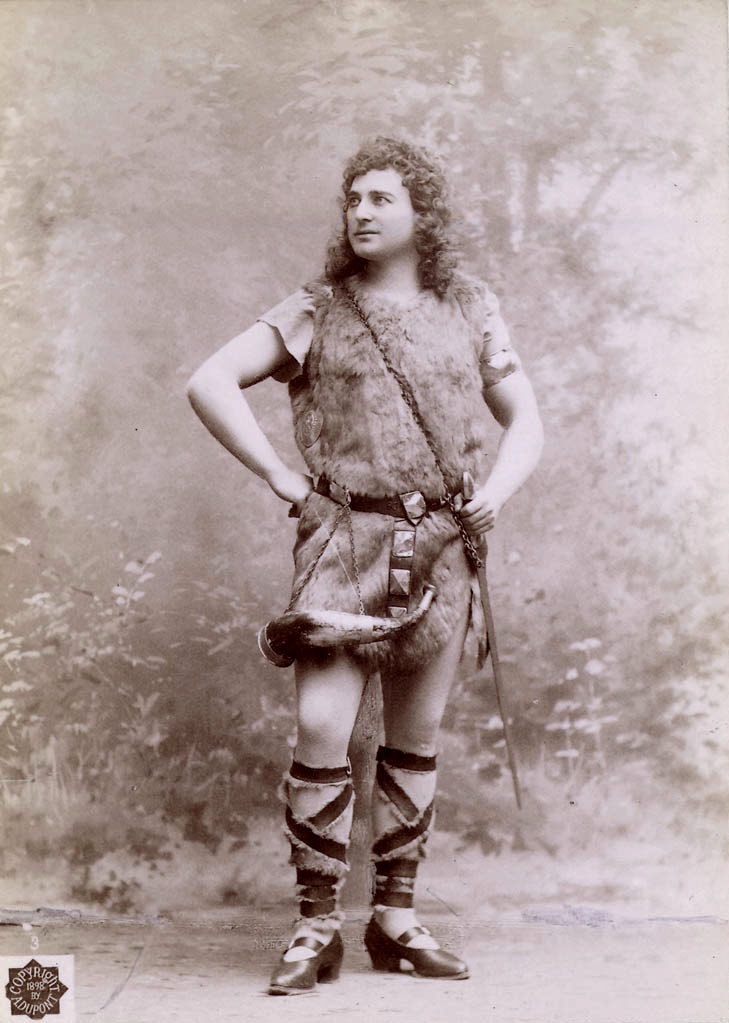
As Siegfried in 1898

Dippel made his debut at the Metropolitan Opera on 26 November 1890 in the title role of Alberto Franchetti's Asrael for its United States premiere. He appeared with the company 392 times including three other US premieres – Antonio Smareglia's Il vassalo di Szigeth (1890), Ernest II, Duke of Saxe-Coburg and Gotha's Diana von Solange (1891), and Richard Strauss' Salome (1907). His final appearance at the Met was as Froh in Das Rheingold on 13 April 1908.

Over his entire career as a tenor, he sang 164 tenor roles, ranging from Don Ottavio in Mozart's Don Giovanni to a wide variety of Wagnerian parts, including the leading tenor roles in Lohengrin and Die Meistersinger von Nürnberg. He sang the most tenor-roles in the history of opera. He was known for his willingness to step into roles when his colleagues were ill and substituted for Jean de Reszke on several occasions and even for famous Enrico Caruso twice.

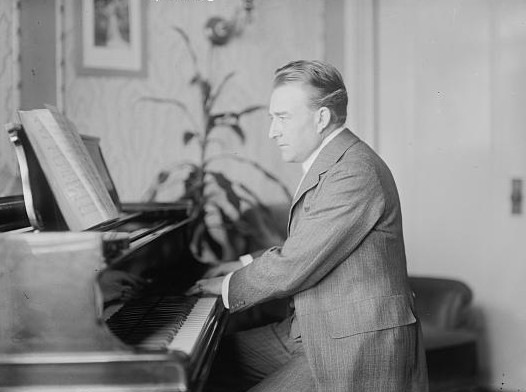
Andreas Dippel at the piano, photographed circa 1908

In 1908, Dippel became the joint manager of the Metropolitan Opera with Giulio Gatti-Casazza. He resigned his post in 1910, and from 1910 to 1913 managed the Philadelphia-Chicago Grand Opera Company, after which he formed the Dippel Opera Comique Company. The Dippel Opera Comique Company produced the Broadway premiere of Lilac Domino at the 44th Street Theatre on 28 October 1914. It ran for 109 performances and then toured the US. Rather less successful was Dippel's next Broadway production, The Love Mill, which opened at the 48th Street Theatre on 17 February 1918 and closed five weeks later after 52 performances. Dippel had his own opera school at the Ithaca Conservatory of Music in the 1920s, and in his later years, worked in the movie industry as a voice coach and musical advisor. He was married to the actress Anita Lenar.

Andreas Dippel died of heart disease at the age of 65 in Hollywood, California, on 12 May 1932.

== Recordings ==
Die Königin von Saba: "Erzählung"
Andreas Dippel sings a tenor aria from Goldmark's Die Königin von Saba. Recorded for Edison Records in 1906.

Andreas Dippel made six cylinders for Edison Records and several unpublished recordings for the Victor Talking Machine Company. He also appears on several Mapleson cylinders, which were recorded live at the Metropolitan Opera. Some of these remastered recordings appear on compilation CDs including:

- Mahler's Decade In Vienna — Singers Of The Court Opera 1897–1907, Marston Records 53004. (Dippel sings "Plus blanche que la blanche hermine" from Les Huguenots, recorded 1906.)
- Helden an geweihtem Ort — Wagnertenöre in Bayreuth, Preiser Records 89944. (Dippel sings "Mein lieber Schwan" (Lohengrin's farewell) from Lohengrin, recorded 1906.)
- Emma Calvé — The Complete 1902 G&T, 1920 Pathé and "Mapleson Cylinder" Recordings, Marston Records 52013 (Emma Calvé, Andreas Dippel, and Marcel Journet sing "Anges purs", excerpt from Trio and Apotheosis, Act V of Faust, recorded 1902.)
