= List of New Hampshire historical markers (201–225) =

- «176–200 226–250»

This page is one of a series of pages that list New Hampshire historical markers. The text of each marker is provided within its entry.

Contents
| No. | Title | Location | Coordinates |
|---|---|---|---|
| 201 | Jonathan Chesley 1736–1826 | Barnstead | 43.32972°N 71.25592°W |
| 202 | The Enfield Shakers | Enfield | 43.6201°N 72.14718°W |
| 203 | Stone Arch Bridges | Hillsborough | 43.11163°N 71.91871°W |
| 204 | Newhall & Stebbins | Hinsdale | 42.78724°N 72.47975°W |
| 205 | Bear Brook CCC Camp 1935–1942 | Allenstown | 43.16031°N 71.38029°W |
| 206 | The MacDowell Graves | Peterborough | 42.88643°N 71.95437°W |
| 207 | Granville Homestead | Madison | 43.89902°N 71.14559°W |
| 208 | St. Mary's Bank Credit Union / La Caisse Populaire Sainte-Marie | Manchester | 42.99322°N 71.4757°W |
| 209 | Wentworth Cheswill (1746–1817) | Newmarket | 43.07596°N 70.94352°W |
| 210 | Settler's Rock | Peterborough | 42.85912°N 71.96274°W |
| 211 | Suncook Connection Bridge | Allenstown | 43.13052°N 71.44589°W |
| 212 | Deputy Sheriff Charles E. Smith 1843–1891 | Barrington | 43.25462°N 71.03573°W |
| 213 | Frankenstein Trestle | Hart's Location | 44.15619°N 71.3636°W |
| 214 | Pawtuckaway CCC Camp | Deerfield | 43.10084°N 71.24718°W |
| 215 | Maynesborough's First Residence 1824 | Berlin | 44.51088°N 71.15291°W |
| 216 | Pierce Shops | Chesterfield | 42.90667°N 72.41999°W |
| 217 | Bath Bridge | Bath | 44.15252°N 71.97579°W |
| 218 | Pierce Bridge | Bethlehem | 44.27169°N 71.6308°W |
| 219 | The Weeks Act 1911 | Lancaster | 44.453113°N 71.578074°W |
| 220 | The Ravine House 1877–1963 | Randolph | 44.37443°N 71.29011°W |
| 221 | Armenian Settlement Salem, NH | Salem | 42.75541°N 71.22764°W |
| 222 | New Durham Meetinghouse | New Durham | 43.41318099°N 71.13776261°W |
| 223 | Home Site of Nathaniel Berry Governor, 1861–1863 | Hebron | 43.69425977°N 71.80700989°W |
| 224 | Betty and Barney Hill Incident | Lincoln | 44.08551°N 71.68418°W |
| 225 | Stark Park | Manchester | 43.01508°N 71.46845°W |
Notes • References • External links

== Markers 201 to 225 ==
=== 201. Jonathan Chesley 1736–1826 ===
Town of Barnstead

"This patriot and civic leader rests in a nearby grave on land he once farmed. In 1764 he contracted to build Barnstead's portion of the Province Road. On December 14-15, 1774 he participated in raids on the British Fort William and Mary in New Castle capturing needed munitions for the Patriot Militia at the Battle of Bunker Hill. During the Revolution he was an army quartermaster providing critical logistical support to feed, clothe and equip the Continental Army. Following the war, Chesley served as selectman, state representative and delegate to the 1784 state convention that ratified the U.S. Constitution."

=== 202. The Enfield Shakers ===
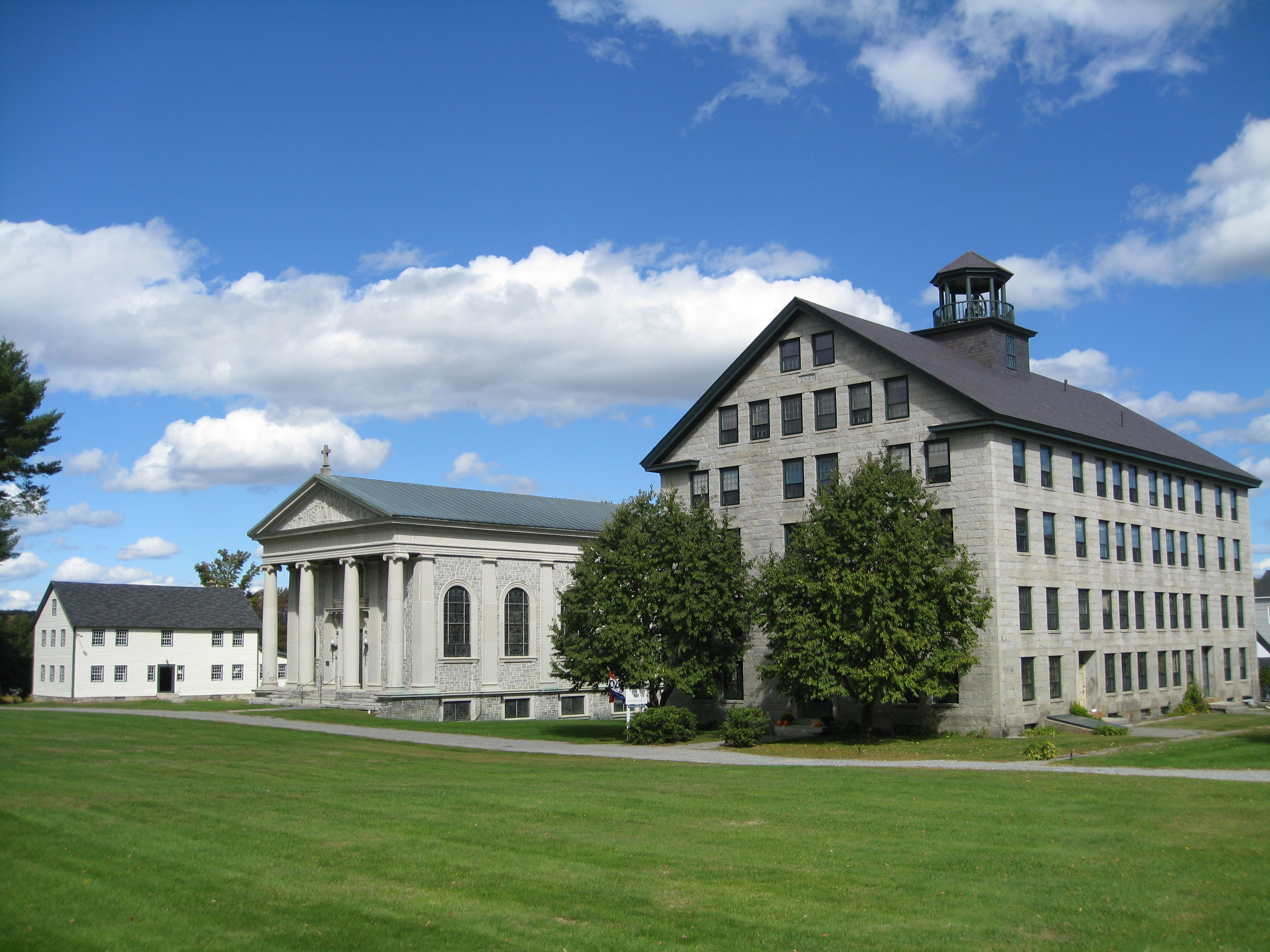
Great Stone Dwelling, at right, now part of the Enfield Shaker Museum

Town of Enfield

"Founded in 1793, Enfield Shaker Village was the 9th of the original Shaker communities established in the U.S. At its peak c.1850 some 300 Shakers lived, worked and worshipped here, practicing equality of the sexes, celibacy, pacifism, racial equality, and communal ownership of property. This self-contained community farmed 3,000 acres and maintained more than 50 buildings along four miles of highway. Surviving Shaker buildings include the 1837 Great Stone Dwelling, one of the largest Shaker structures ever built. The Shakers left Enfield in 1923."

=== 203. Stone Arch Bridges ===
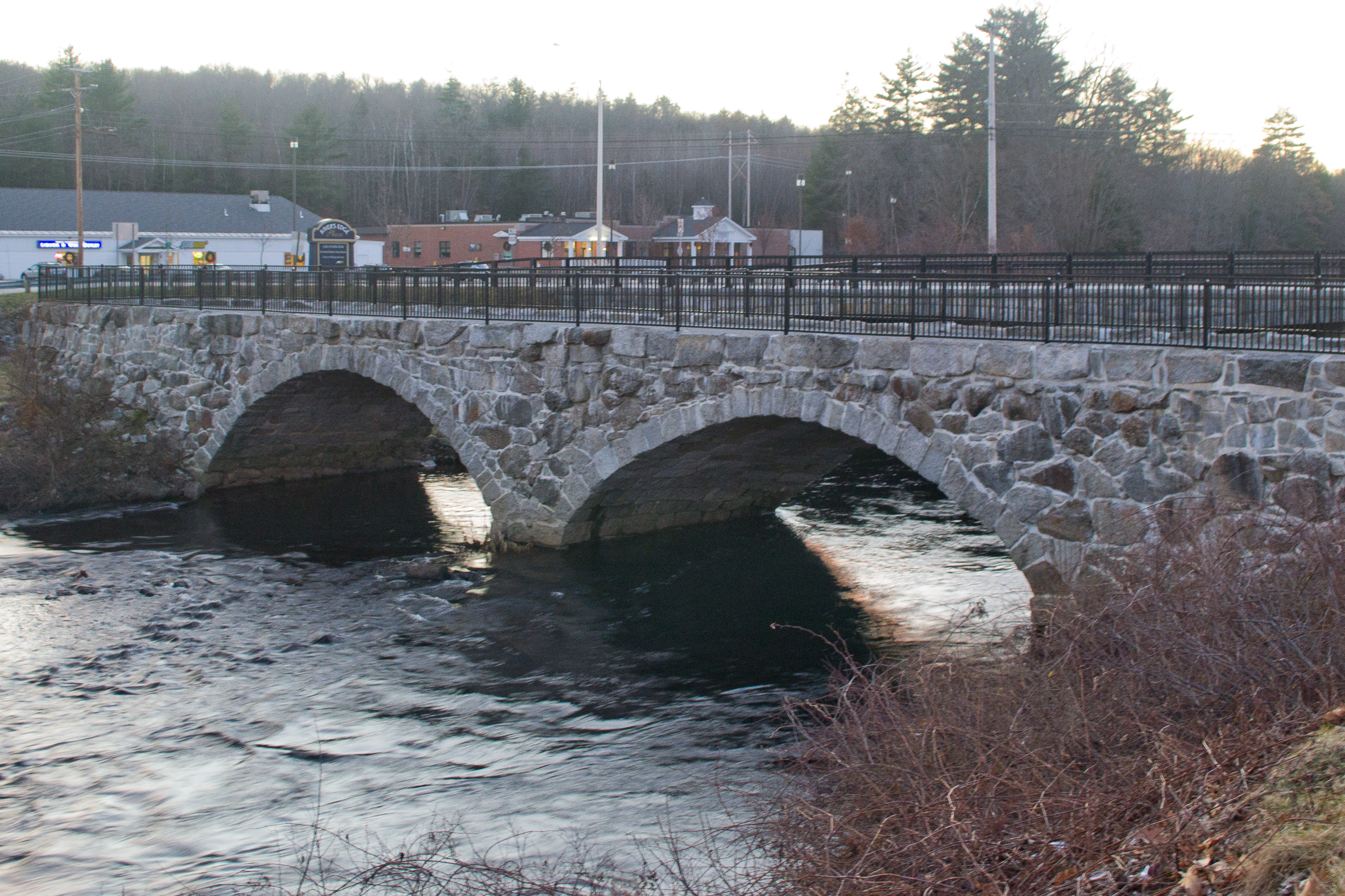
Sawyer Bridge in Hillsborough

Town of Hillsborough

"Beginning in the 1830s, a few arched granite highway bridges were built in southern New Hampshire under the supervision of engineers from major manufacturing centers. By the 1850s, rural stonemasons had mastered the art of building such bridges without mortar. Hiram Monroe (1799–1871), active in town affairs, persuaded Hillsborough to build a dozen. Five survive, and a sixth is covered by Pierce Lake. Among the local builders were Reuben E. Loveren (1817–1883), and brothers Calvin A. Gould (1826–1877) and James H. Gould (1828–1890). All three worked on this, the double-arched Sawyer Bridge, in 1866."

=== 204. Newhall & Stebbins ===
Town of Hinsdale

"Formed in 1856, the firm of Newhall & Stebbins began manufacturing the Granite State Field Mower in 1860. Machined out of cast iron with few bolts, the mowers were intended for use on the uneven terrain of New England farms. In 1870 the company employed 18 men and manufactured 525 mowing machines. They began to make lawn mowers in 1881 and lawn trimmers in 1906. By 1909 they made about 15,000 machines each year and exported all over the world. The business was bought by William S. Howe in 1917 and operated on Canal Street until 1962."

=== 205. Bear Brook CCC Camp 1935–1942 ===
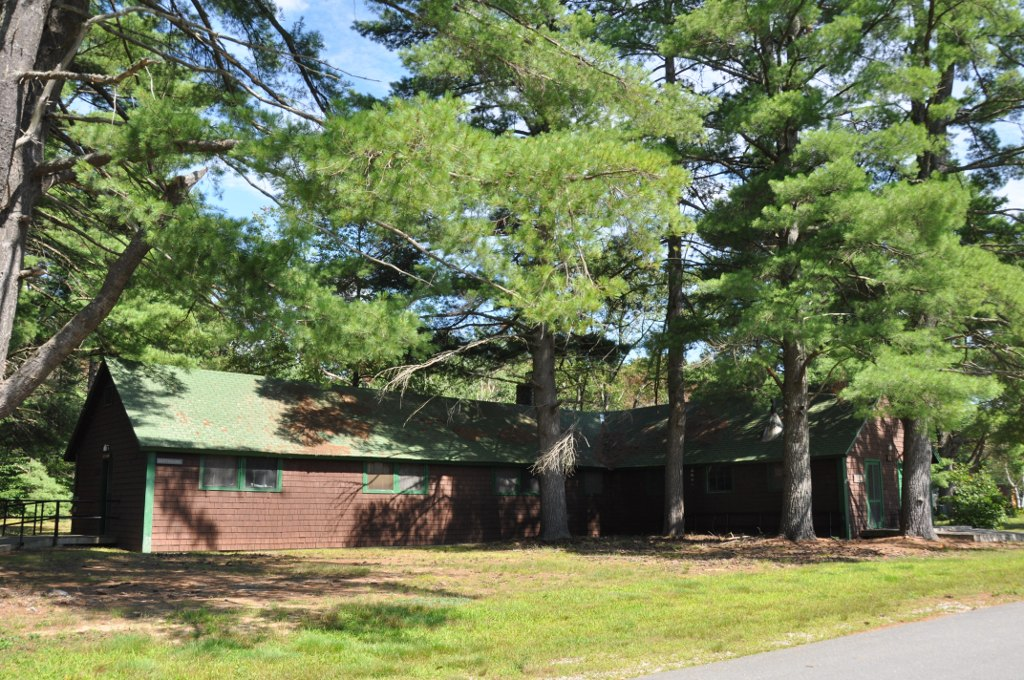
CCC Camp building in what is now Bear Brook State Park

Town of Allenstown

"The Bear Brook Civilian Conservation Corps (CCC) Camp was one of 28 work camps established in N.H. between 1933 and 1942. President Franklin D. Roosevelt started the program after the Depression to put young unemployed men to work in conservation. From 1935 to 1938 the 1123rd Co. CCC was here; later this was one of four CCC camps in the state to employ World War I veterans. Bear Brook was the last active CCC camp in N.H. and was given to the state in 1943. It was listed in the National Register of Historic Places in 1992 as one of the country's most intact CCC camps."

=== 206. The MacDowell Graves ===
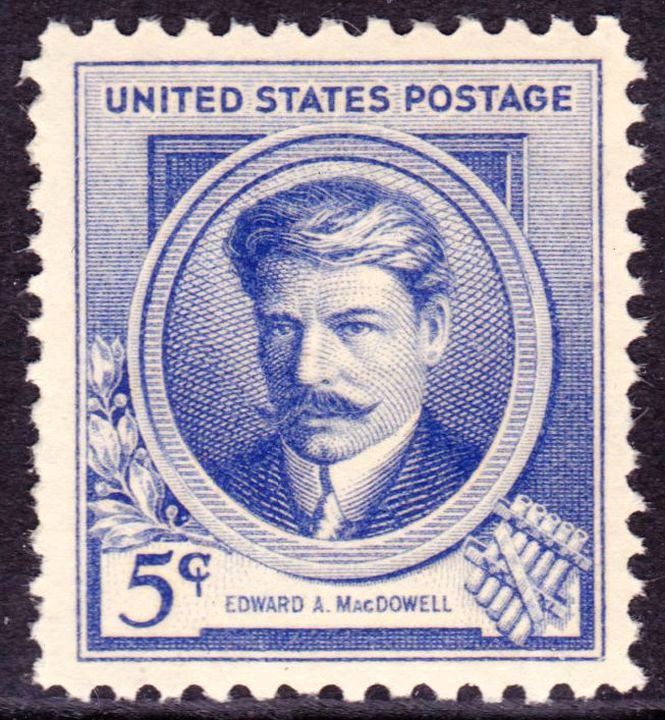
Edward MacDowell, on a 1940 postage stamp

Town of Peterborough

"Buried on this site are noted composer Edward MacDowell (1860–1908) and his wife, Marian Nevins MacDowell (1857–1956). The composer often paused at this boulder to watch the sun set behind Mount Monadnock. Edward and Marian purchased a small farm and moved to Peterborough in 1896. Together they founded The MacDowell Colony in 1907, the first and leading residency program for artists in the United States. On the acres to the north and west of this site, The MacDowell Colony continues to offer talented artists ideal working conditions in which they can produce enduring works of the imagination."

=== 207. Granville Homestead ===
Town of Madison

"Nearby is the birthplace of the Granville brothers: Zantford (Granny), Thomas, Robert, Mark and Edward and sisters Pearle and Gladys. With Madison natives Hiram Jones, Harry Jones, and Elson Ward, they formed the Granville Brothers Aircraft Co. in Springfield, Massachusetts, and designed, manufactured and flew notable racing aircraft of the Golden Age of Aviation. In 1932 the Gee Bee Model R-1 set a new world speed record of 296 mph. Their high performance designs represented the cutting edge of technology and dramatically influenced military and civilian aviation."

=== 208. St. Mary's Bank Credit Union / La Caisse Populaire Sainte-Marie ===
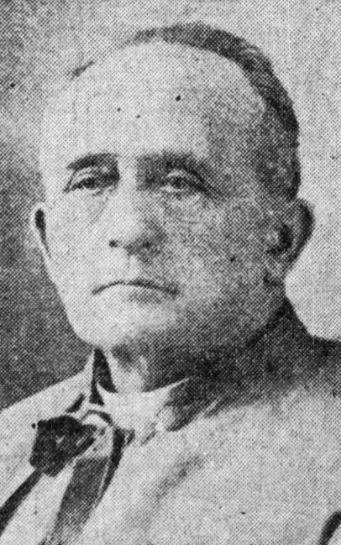
Monsignor Pierre Hevey

City of Manchester

"The first credit union in the U.S. was founded here in 1908, the inspiration of Monsignor Pierre Hevey, the pastor of Sainte-Marie Parish. Monsignor Hevey sought to improve the economic stability and independence of the French-speaking mill workers by giving them a safe and welcoming place to save and borrow money. Until 1913 the credit union was located here in the home of attorney Joseph Boivin, its first president and manager. Initially open just evenings and holidays, the credit union grew to become one of the state's most stable financial institutions."

The other side of the sign contains the same narrative, written in French:

"La première caisse populaire aux États-Unis fut fondée ici en 1908, inspiration de l'abbé Pierre Hévey, curé de la paroisse Ste-Marie, qui cherchait à améliorer la stabilité et l'indépendance économiques des ouvriers francophones en leur offrant un endroit accueillant et sécuritaire pour déposer et pour emprunter de l'argent. Jusqu'en 1913, elle avait ses bureaux ici, chez Me Joseph Bolvin, son premier président et directeur. Ouverte au début uniquement en soirée et les jours fériés, la caisse populaire est devenue une des plus stables institutions financiers de l'état."

=== 209. Wentworth Cheswill (1746–1817) ===
Town of Newmarket

"One of the earliest students at Governor Dummer Academy in Massachusetts, Cheswill was among Newmarket's best-educated and most prosperous citizens. He was entrusted with many offices, including justice of the peace, selectman, town clerk, moderator, and representative. He amassed a noted private library, helped found the Newmarket Social Library, corresponded with Jeremy Belknap (1744–1798), New Hampshire's first historian, and conducted pioneering archaeological investigations. His father, Hopestill, was a noted housewright. His grandfather, Richard, was listed as 'Negro.'"

=== 210. Settler's Rock ===
Town of Peterborough

"Scotch-Irish immigrant Thomas Morison and a companion camped beside this rock about 1739. The large boulder supported a temporary shelter of green poles and boughs, and its vertical face served as a fireplace. In 1749 Morison returned as the first permanent settler of Peterborough and the following year he brought his family to a log house he had built near the rock. Morison was an incorporator of the town in 1760, served on the first board of selectmen and was the town's first moderator. He resided on the farm until his death in 1797 at the age of 87."

=== 211. Suncook Connection Bridge ===
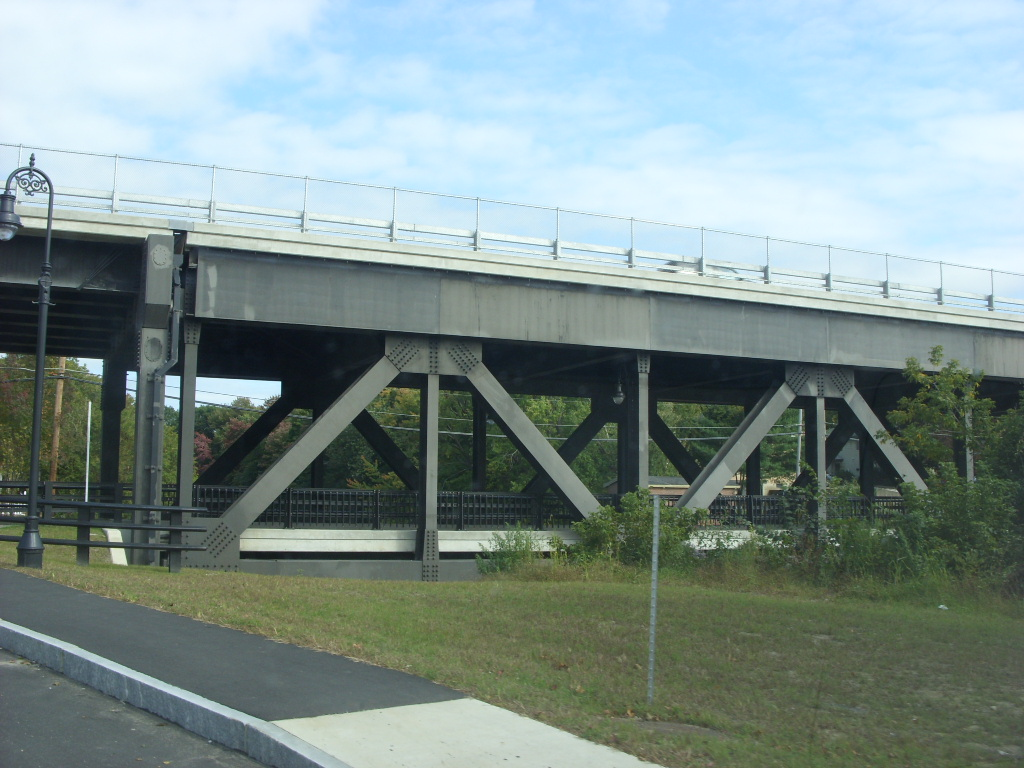
Suncook Connection Bridge in 2012

Town of Allenstown

"In 1931, the N.H. State Highway Department built an unusual double-deck truss bridge over the Suncook River to remove traffic on the Daniel Webster Highway (Route 3) from Main Street in Suncook Village. Designed by Harold E. Langley (1896–1991), an award-winning department engineer, the bridge allowed high-speed bypass travel on the upper deck while providing connections with the Suncook Valley Road (Buck Street) on the lower deck. It was the only double-deck bridge in N.H. when it was replaced in 2007. Local sentiment persuaded highway officials to build a similar but larger span."

=== 212. Deputy Sheriff Charles E. Smith 1843–1891 ===
Town of Barrington

"On May 6, 1891, Strafford County Deputy Sheriff Charles E. Smith was shot in the hip while apprehending a horse thief. The wounded Deputy insisted that the thief not be lynched. Smith succumbed to his wounds on May 23, 1891. A Civil War veteran, Smith was one of Barrington's selectmen, had been town clerk and representative in the legislature as well as a prominent businessman. A tribute published by the Manchester Union on May 25, 1891, said 'He died in defense of the law and in the attempt to do his duty.'"

=== 213. Frankenstein Trestle ===
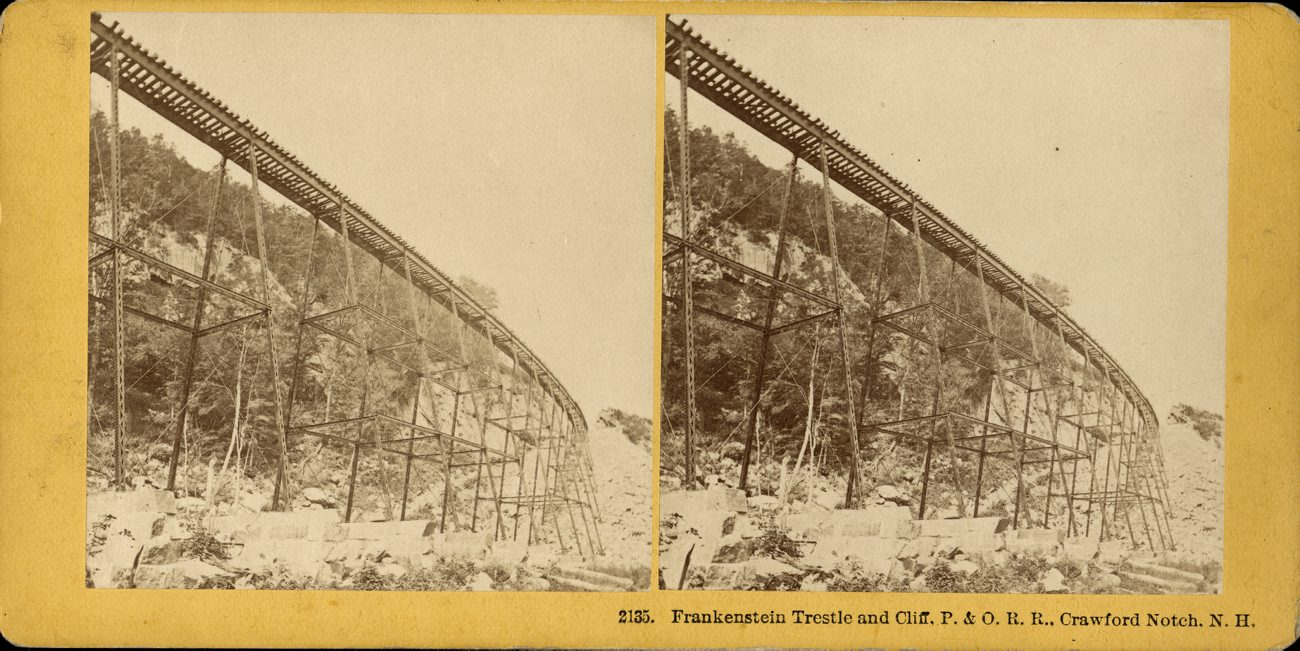
Stereoscopic pair of photographs of Frankenstein Trestle, c. 1890

Town of Hart's Location

"The high steel trestle above was built in 1893 to replace a wrought iron trestle of 1875, and was strengthened in 1930 and 1950. Named for American Artist Godfrey N. Frankenstein (1820–1873), the adjacent cliff and gulf were formidable barriers to completion of the Portland and Ogdensburg Railroad, later the Maine Central, which connected Portland, ME, and the Great Lakes. Trains used the trestle until 1983. It now carries excursion trains through Crawford Notch."

=== 214. Pawtuckaway CCC Camp ===
Town of Deerfield

"28 Civilian Conservation Corps camps were established in NH under FDR's New Deal to provide jobs and training to young men during the Great Depression. In June 1933, a camp was set up on this site. For four years the men completed projects promoting natural resource conservation and its public benefit, including trail clearing, reforestation, and Blister Rust tree disease eradication. In 1938, some of the buildings were turned over to the town, and this site became the permanent home of the Deerfield Fair Association."

=== 215. Maynesborough's First Residence 1824 ===
City of Berlin

"On the knoll north of this site, William Sessions and his nephew, Cyrus Wheeler erected 'the first building that could be honored with the name of house' in what is now Berlin, NH. (Note: Berlin was originally granted as "Maynesborough" in honor of William Mayne, 1st Baron Newhaven.) Sessions helped clear many other farms in the area. In the 20th century, the property was the Brown Company farm. The two barns still extant housed draft horses for the logging side of the business: the larger was moved about 1/4 mile south from W. R. Brown's Arabian horse stud-farm in 1947."

=== 216. Pierce Shops ===
Town of Chesterfield

"Spofford Village attained national stature in the 19th century for the manufacture of bits, augers, and gimlets in a series of shops powered by Partridge Brook. Benjamin Pierce, members of the Hopkins family, and others also began to manufacture 'patent accelerating heads' for hand spinning wheels in a wooden building on this site. These attachments provided rapid spindle rotation that was suited to spinning the wool of Merino sheep. By the 1860s, Spofford Village was producing over 60,000 patent heads each year for sale throughout the nation."

=== 217. Bath Bridge ===
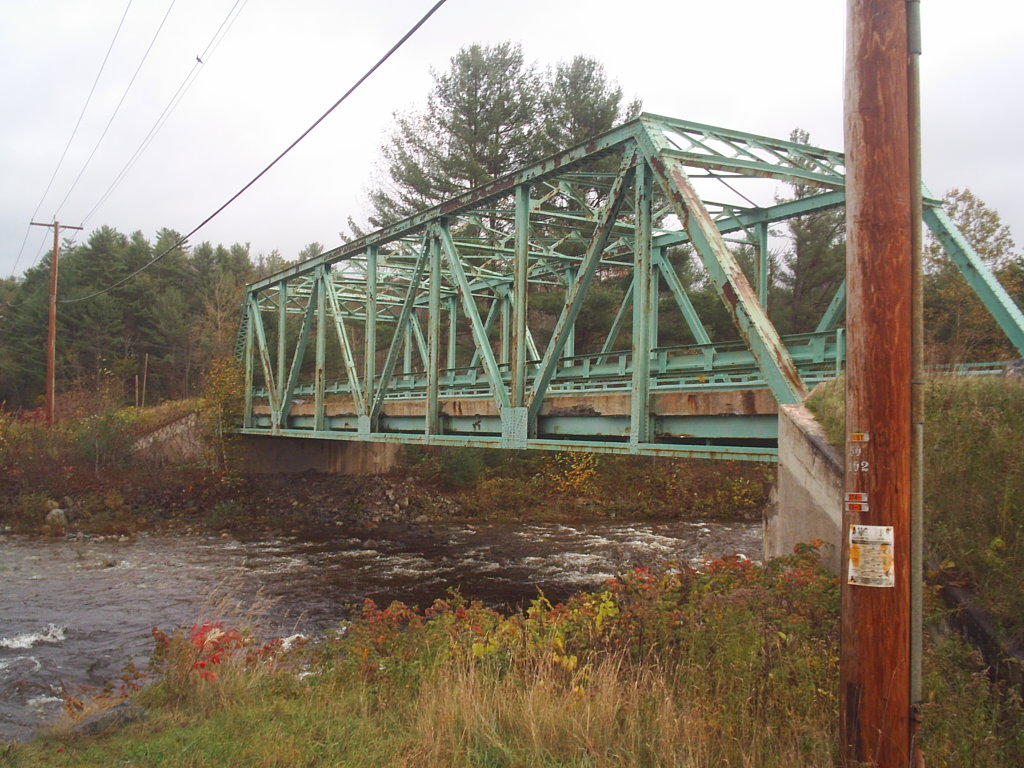
Bath Bridge crossing the Wild Ammonoosuc River

Town of Bath

"Erected in 1928, this riveted steel Warren truss span was built to replace a wooded span destroyed in the 1927 flood. This efficient truss design is based on a series of equilateral triangles with verticals added for strength. Boston Bridge Works fabricated the structure in Elmira, NY. Reflecting recent improvements in steel technology, the bridge incorporates rolled I-beams that minimized shop time and eased assembly in the field. This standard plan was also used in Bethlehem Hollow." (Note: Bath Bridge spans the Wild Ammonoosuc River; it was bypassed in 1989 and is now open only to pedestrians.)

=== 218. Pierce Bridge ===
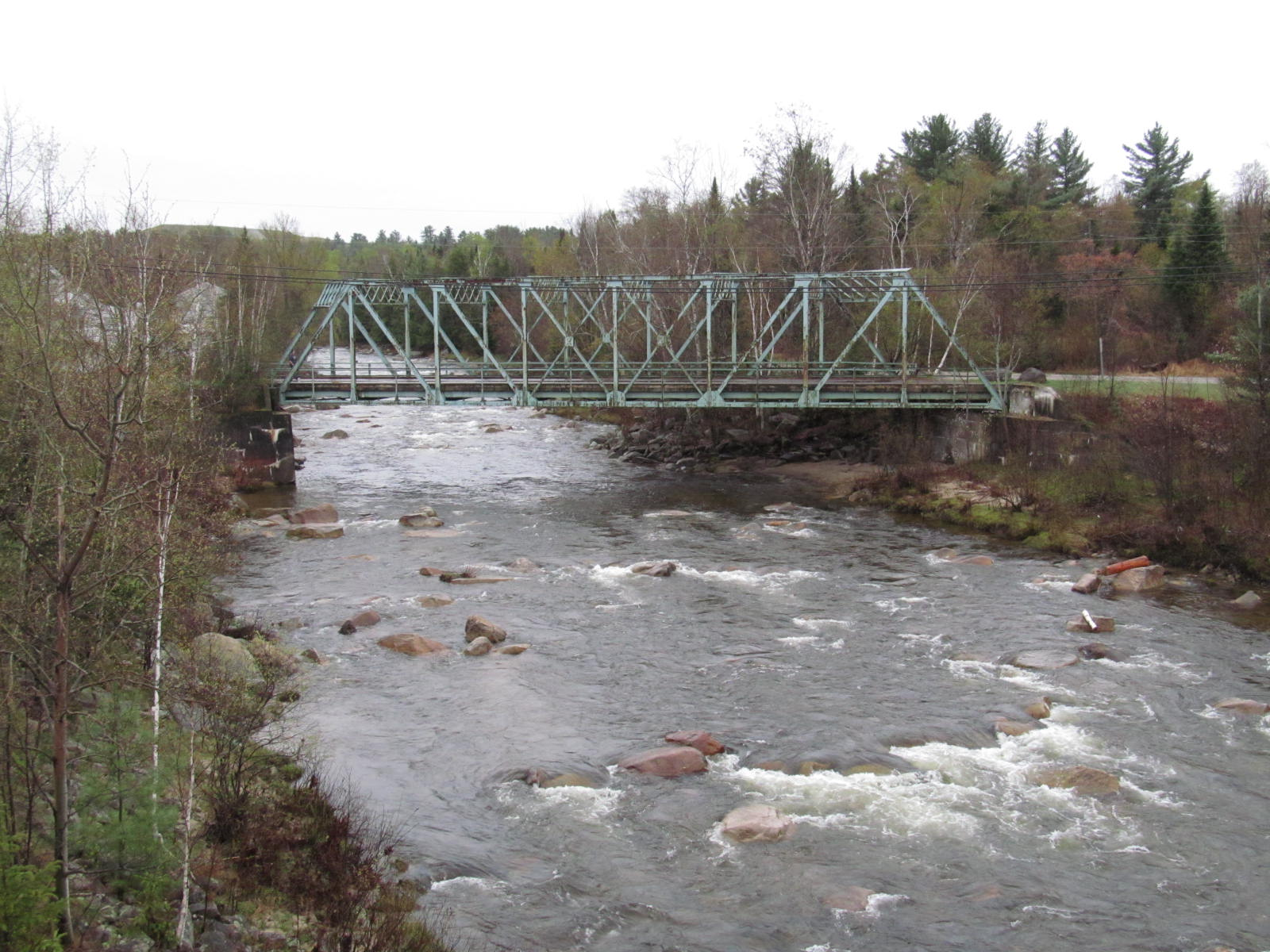
Pierce Bridge crossing the Ammonoosuc River

Town of Bethlehem

"By 1920 the adjacent road, Rt. 302 was part of the Teddy Roosevelt (TR) Trail, which ran from Maine to Oregon. It was an important way for tourists to access the White Mountains. After the 1927 floods, many bridges needed to be quickly replaced. With vertical members in compression and diagonals in tension, the High Pratt truss was strong and easy to construct, making it a favorite of state highway engineers. This riveted steel span was erected in 1928, keeping this important crossing in use." (Note: Pierce Bridge spans the Ammonoosuc River; it was bypassed in 1983 and is now open only to pedestrians.)

=== 219. The Weeks Act 1911 ===
Town of Lancaster

"The Lodge atop Mt. Prospect was the summer home of John Wingate Weeks (1860–1926), renowned 'Father of the Eastern National Forests,' author of The Weeks Act, passed by the U.S. Congress, March 1, 1911. The Act enables the government to buy privately owned land to be 'permanently reserved, held and administered as national forest lands,' for the protection, development, and use of their natural resources. Much of the White Mountain National Forest (WMNF), one of the 48 forests made possible by The Weeks Act, can be viewed from the Lodge and from the fieldstone fire tower near the Lodge."

=== 220. The Ravine House 1877–1963 ===
Ravine House in Randolph

Town of Randolph

"In 1876 Abel Watson and his son Laban converted their farm on this site, facing King Ravine on Mt. Adams, into a summer boarding house. Enlarged in 1884 and subsequently, the Ravine House became a key institution in opening up the northern Presidential Range to trail builders and hikers. At its zenith between the two World Wars, the hotel accommodated some 100 guests, offering tennis courts, a bowling alley, trout fishing, a swimming pond, and hiking. It closed in 1960 and was razed in 1963."

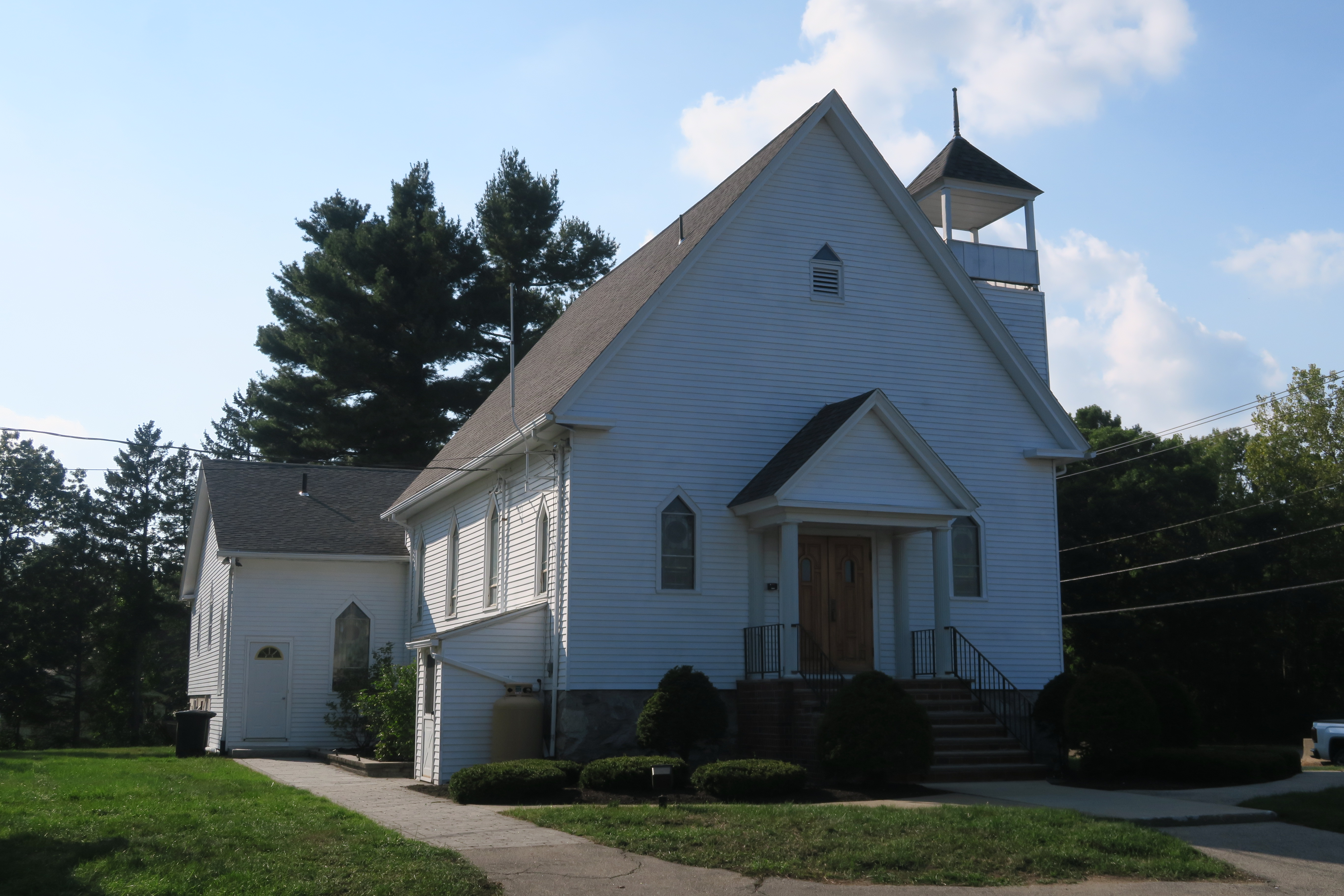
Ararat Armenian Congregational Church in Salem

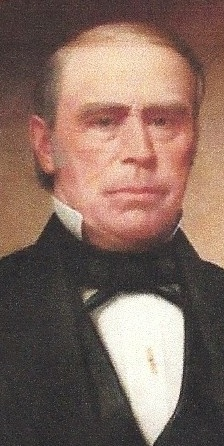
Nathaniel S. Berry

=== 221. Armenian Settlement Salem, NH ===
Town of Salem

"Around 1900, this area was settled by Armenian immigrants fleeing massacres and religious persecution in their homeland. They established a community here where they maintained their heritage and religious traditions. Farming was the primary occupation until the 1940s. They built the nearby Ararat Armenian Congregational Church in 1913, and it remains a symbol of their freedom to worship and the center of community life."

=== 222. New Durham Meetinghouse ===
Town of New Durham

"The New Durham Meetinghouse was built by settlers from Durham and nearby towns in 1770 as their house of worship and seat of government until 1819 when the town's first church was built. This area was the town center until the 1850s when the arrival of the railroad favored development in 'The Plains.' The Meetinghouse was reduced to 1 story in 1838, vacated in 1908. The town had it listed in the National Register in 1980. It can be found by following Davis Crossing Rd and turning left on Old Bay."

=== 223. Home Site of Nathaniel Berry Governor, 1861–1863 ===
Town of Hebron

"Governor Berry led the state through the Civil War. As one of its signers, he read the Altoona (PA) Conference letter to Pres. Lincoln in Washington. The letter pledges 22 governors' support of the Union cause via a commitment to provide additional soldiers to the war effort, as well as supporting the Emancipation Proclamation, issued Jan. 1, 1863. Berry was instrumental in the creation of several NH regiments, including the 3rd, home of the Nevers' Band, still active today."

=== 224. Betty and Barney Hill Incident ===
Town of Lincoln

"On the night of September 19–20, 1961, Portsmouth, NH couple Betty and Barney Hill experienced a close encounter with an unidentified flying object and two hours of 'lost' time while driving south on Rte 3 near Lincoln. They filed an official Air Force Project Blue Book report of a brightly lit cigar-shaped craft the next day, but were not public with their story until it was leaked in the Boston Traveler in 1965. This was the first widely reported UFO abduction report in the United States."

Note: As of January 2022, this marker was reportedly due to be revised. In question is the passage stating the Hills "were not public with their story until it was leaked in the Boston Traveler in 1965", as they filed reports with the Air Force and NICAP, and spoke about the incident with a church group and UFO study group.

=== 225. Stark Park ===
City of Manchester

"This 30 acre tract along the Merrimack River was the family farm of Revolutionary War hero General John Stark and his wife Molly. When soldiers were stricken with smallpox at Ticonderoga, the General sent them here to his farm to recover. General Stark returned here at the end of the war. He died in 1822 and is buried in the family plot in the park. The city of Manchester purchased this site from Stark descendants in 1891, and it was dedicated as a public park in 1893."
