= Chesterfield Gorge =

Chesterfield Gorge may refer to a location in the United States:

- Chesterfield Gorge (Massachusetts)
- Chesterfield Gorge Natural Area in New Hampshire
