= Herman Rietzel =

Herman Rietzel was an American pianist, born January 24, 1863, in New York City, who died by drowning at age 19 on May 26, 1882. He was the youngest son of Adine and Frederick Rietzell, the latter Vice-President and first flute of the New York Philharmonic Society.

== Studies and professional career ==
Herman demonstrated musical ability from an early age. His first public performance was in December 1874 at New York's Stadt Theatre, where he conducted an adult orchestra and cast and chorus of children in Schneewittchen, a fairy tale opera by his elder brother John C. Rietzel, who was also concertmaster. Around this same time Herman played the part of Mozart at a high society costume ball at the Academy of Music, where he played a piano solo and also accompanied children dancing to a polonaise and minuet.

In July 1877, Rietzel traveled to Europe to study. In the April preceding his departure, a gala farewell concert was held in his honor with Leopold Damrosch leading the orchestra. On this occasion Reitzel performed Chopin's Piano Concerto No. 1. Other performers included singers Eugenie Pappenheim, soprano, and Adolph Sohst, baritone; violinist Hermann Brandt; and Frederick Bergner, principal cellist of the Philharmonic. Sponsorship was by the matriarchs of several socially prominent families associated with the Philharmonic.

After studies in Stuttgart, Germany, with Wilhelm Speidel, Herman returned to the United States; he made his debut at Steinway Hall in New York on May 10, 1877, and, beginning two years before his death, he performed several times as soloist with the New York Philharmonic, enjoying particular success in one of the piano concerti of Hermann Goetz during the 1881-1882 season. According to an official of Steinway and Sons, Rafael Joseffy spoke highly of Rietzel's promise, and in fact Reitzel was chosen to substitute for Joseffy, who had incurred a hand injury, in Beethoven's Fourth piano concerto with the Staten Island Philharmonic Society on January 24, 1880, Rietzel's 17th birthday. Although he had never prepared the work for performance before, Rietzel quickly learned it in time for the public rehearsal on January 23 and at the concert performed "with entire success technically, and such artistic success as could be expected from one so young with so mature a work before him." Some months later, on Joseffy's personal piano, Rietzel played the first part to Joseffy's second in the Variations on a Theme of Beethoven for two pianos, four hands, Op.35, by Camille Saint-Saëns at the New York auditorium known as Chickering Hall. Joseffy was sufficiently pleased that the two repeated their performance in a charity recital at the New York home of banker, stockbroker, and railroad magnate Henry K. McHarg on March 23 of the following year.,

== Other musical skills ==
Rietzel was an excellent sight reader on piano and other instruments alike. As a child he learned to play many orchestral instruments; among them was the flute, which he learned secretly as a surprise for his father. Thereafter, he sometimes substituted for his father in the theater. On one occasion Rietzel at sight fluently transposed and performed on the viola the first part of a trio for three cellos by Félix Battanchon, written in three clefs. Frederick Bergner spoke with admiration of Rietzel's skills as an accompanist, even when Rietzel was a small child.

Reitzal's ambitions as a composer were largely unrealized, cut short by his early death. He had ideas for compositions, but for the most part had not by that time written them down. He did complete one song, "Der Schafer," during his studies in Stuttgart, as a gift for his sister; one other called "I Saw Thee Weep," which he scored but considered unsatisfactory; and fragments of a piano concerto. His one composition of note was the Eine Volksthumliche Suite which was programmed by Theodore Thomas and his orchestra.

== Death ==
Following the 1881-1882 Philharmonic season, Rietzel signed with a touring company headed by Clara Louise Kellogg. During a break in that company's tour of New England, on May 26, 1882, Rietzel and bass singer George Conly took a pleasure outing in a rowboat on Lake Spofford near Chesterfield, New Hampshire; later that day, the boat was found overturned, but Rietzel's body was not recovered until the following June 7. The accident precluded Reitzel's planned participation in a tour through the United States and to Australia and New Zealand in a company being organized by violinist Camilla Urso.

== Memorials ==
A memorial concert for the two victims on June 10, 1882, at New York's Academy of Music lasted more than three hours and raised at least $4,000 (roughly $100,000 in 2017 money) for the benefit of Conly's wife and children. Among the participants was virtuoso pianist Teresa Carreño, who performed Liszt's Hungarian Rhapsody no. 6 and, as an encore, music of Louis Moreau Gottschalk. Also participating was a young Emma Juch, of the same age Reitzel had been at his death, who had made her US debut in the same house only eight months before.

Rafael Joseffy, upon learning of Rietzel's death, withdrew a composition that was near publication and resubmitted it to the publisher with a dedication to the late pianist.

John Ruggles Strong, son of George Templeton Strong, wrote a sonnet, "In Memoriam H.R.," and a short reminiscence in honor of Reitzel, privately published in 1906 in a volume titled Sonnets, Written as the Pastime of a Long Vacation.
