= Chesterfield Gorge (Massachusetts) =

Nature reserve in Chesterfield, Massachusetts, US

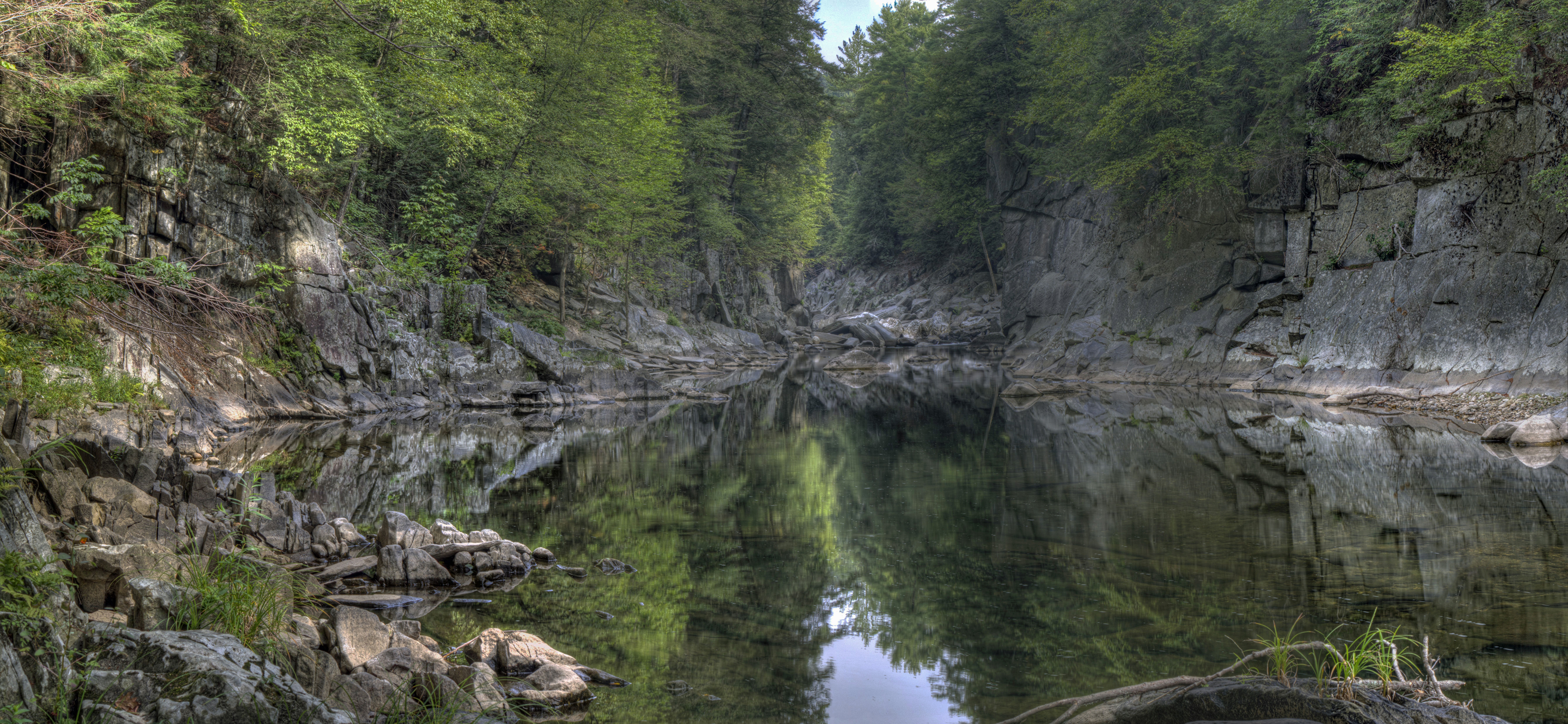
- Chesterfield Gorge and the East Branch of the Westfield River
- Interactive map of Chesterfield Gorge
- Location: River Road, Chesterfield, MA, USA
- Coordinates: 42°23′35″N 72°52′48″W
- Established: Original land acquired in 1929
- Governing body: The Trustees of Reservations
- Website: Chesterfield Gorge

Chesterfield Gorge is a nature reserve located in Chesterfield, Massachusetts, United States. The property is owned by The Trustees of Reservations, who have administered the property since 1929.

Chesterfield Gorge was initially carved from the metamorphic bedrock by torrents of glacial meltwater. Today, the gorge continues to be shaped by the East Branch of the Westfield River. The walls of the gorge are quite steep, more than 30 feet (9.1 m) in some places. During periods of low water, it is possible to get down to the floor of the gorge, but it is not recommended, and no trails exist from the cliff edge to the bottom. Rock climbing is prohibited. The surrounding forest features oak, pine, and hemlock, and is home to bears, bobcats, and turkeys, among many others. A half-mile trail along the cliff top offers views of the gorge, the river, and the forest. A railing runs along the length of the cliff for safety. Along the cliff ledge are fields of boulders, some of which are quite massive.

Stone abutments of a bridge that once spanned the river are all that remains of the old post road between Boston, Massachusetts and Albany, New York. A toll gate was established at its eastern end, but no trace of it exists today. During the American Revolution, British redcoats marched over this bridge to Boston following General Burgoyne's defeat at Saratoga, New York. In 1835, floodwaters swept away the bridge along with some nearby grist and sawmills. A short trail leads along the river upstream from the gorge to the remains of the old bridge. A more extensive trail network extends southward down the river, through the Hiram H. Fox Wildlife Management Area and towards Knightville Dam.

Chesterfield Gorge is the entrance to an extensive natural area along the Westfield River, and is designated a National Wild and Scenic River. Fly fishing for trout is a popular pastime. Atlantic salmon are stocked here, and must not be confused with the local trout, as it is illegal to keep them if caught.

There is, coincidentally, a similar natural area named Chesterfield Gorge located in Chesterfield, New Hampshire.
