= George Kellogg =

George Kellogg may refer to:

- George Kellogg (inventor) (1812–1901), American inventor and patent expert.
- George Kellogg (mint superintendent) (1803–1876), superintendent of the Dahlonega Mint
- George Bradley Kellogg (1826–1875), Vermont military and political figure
