= Partridge Brook =

- Location within New Hampshire Location within the United States

Location
- Country: United States
- State: New Hampshire
- County: Cheshire
- Towns: Chesterfield, Westmoreland

Physical characteristics
- Source: Spofford Lake
  - location: Spofford
  - coordinates: 42°54′32″N 72°25′30″W
  - elevation: 715 ft (218 m)
- Mouth: Connecticut River
  - location: Westmoreland
  - coordinates: 42°58′34″N 72°27′57″W
  - elevation: 226 ft (69 m)
- Length: 7.5 mi (12.1 km)

Basin features
- Tributaries
  - right: Glebe Brook

Partridge Brook is a 7.5-mile-long (12.1 km) stream located in southwestern New Hampshire in the United States. It is a tributary of the Connecticut River, which flows to Long Island Sound.

Partridge Brook begins at the outlet of Spofford Lake at Spofford village in the town of Chesterfield, New Hampshire. The brook flows east, then north, then northwest, into the town of Westmoreland, before reaching the Connecticut River.

In Westmoreland, the brook is subject to New Hampshire's Comprehensive Shoreland Protection Act.

== See also ==
- List of rivers of New Hampshire
