= West Chesterfield, New Hampshire =

Unincorporated community in New Hampshire, United States

- Unincorporated community
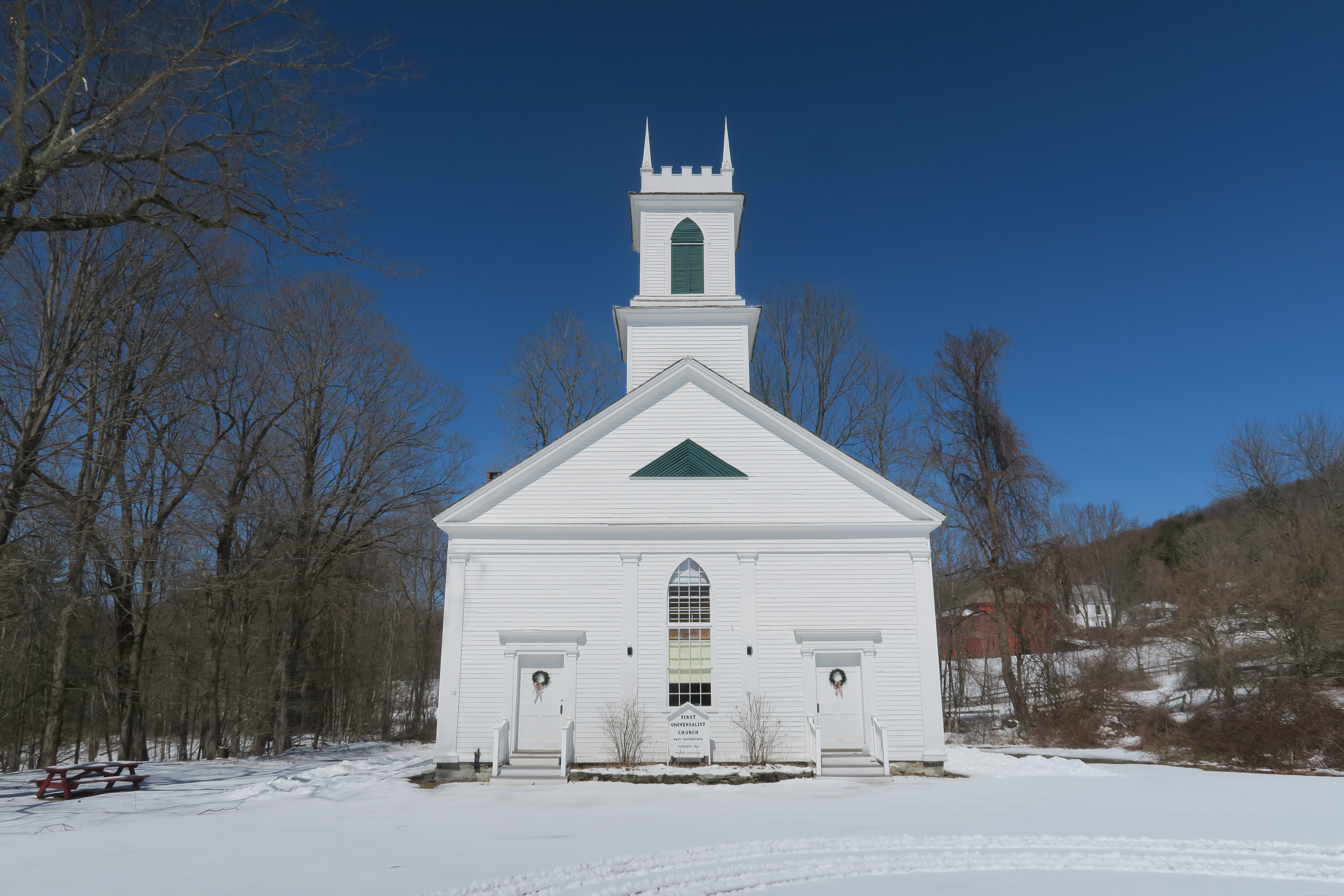
- First Universalist Church

- Location within New Hampshire Location within the United States
- Coordinates: 42°54′15″N 72°30′56″W
- Country: United States
- State: New Hampshire
- County: Cheshire
- Town: Chesterfield
- Elevation: 364 ft (111 m)
- Time zone: UTC-5 (Eastern (EST))
  - Summer (DST): UTC-4 (EDT)
- ZIP code: 03466
- Area code: 603
- GNIS feature ID: 870763

West Chesterfield is an unincorporated community in the town of Chesterfield in Cheshire County, New Hampshire, United States. It is located north of New Hampshire Route 9 in a valley leading to the Connecticut River. Via Route 9, Keene is 14 miles (23 km) to the east, and Brattleboro, Vermont, is 3 miles (5 km) to the west.

West Chesterfield has a separate ZIP code (03466) from the rest of Chesterfield.
