= Spofford Lake =

Lake in New Hampshire, United States

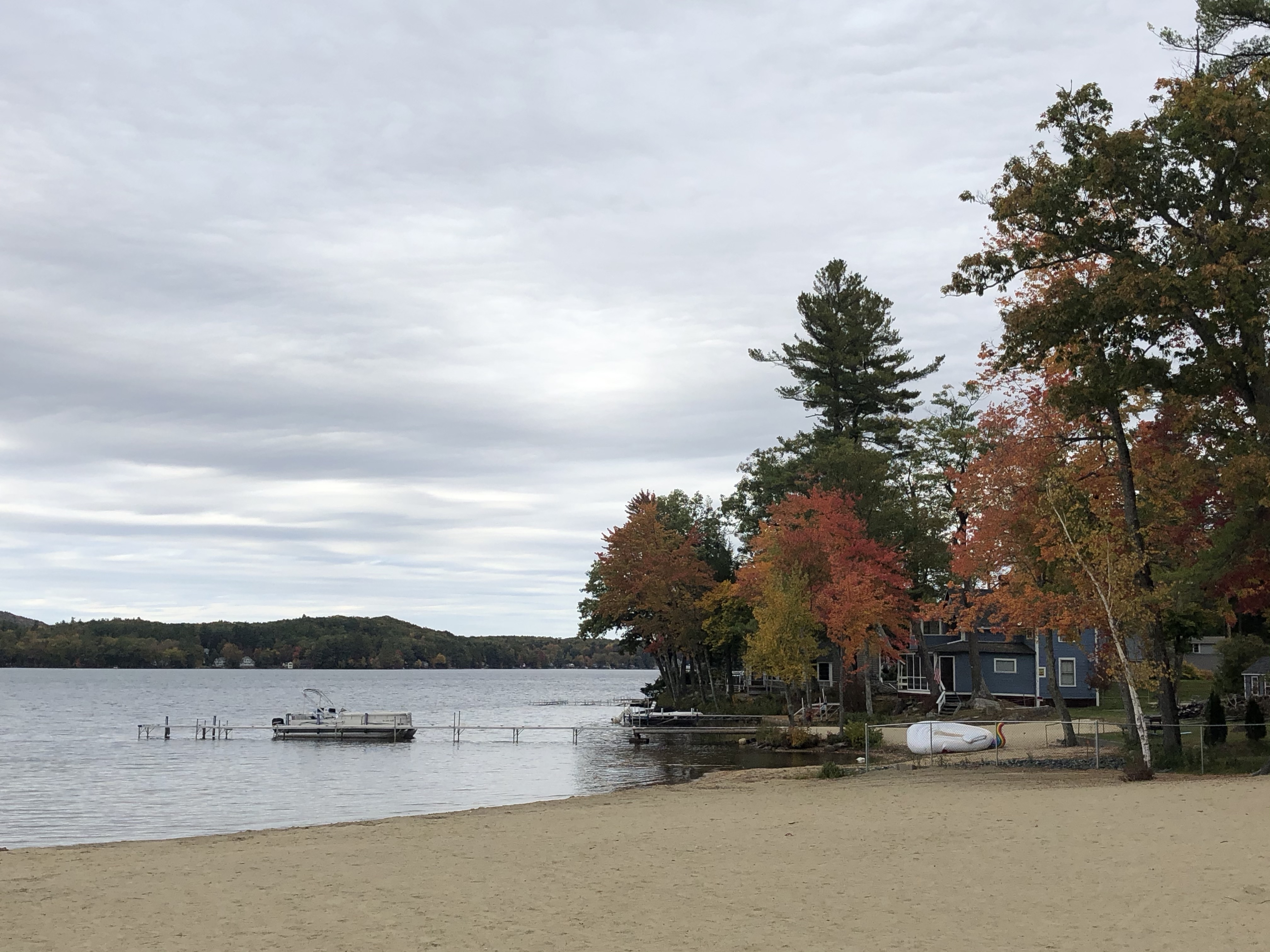
- Ware's Grove Beach, October 2019

- Location within New Hampshire Location within the United States
- Location: Cheshire County, New Hampshire
- Coordinates: 42°54′44″N 72°26′34″W
- Primary outflows: Partridge Brook
- Basin countries: United States
- Max. length: 2.0 mi (3.2 km)
- Max. width: 1.0 mi (1.6 km)
- Surface area: 732 acres (2.96 km^{2})
- Average depth: 30 ft (9.1 m)
- Max. depth: 66 ft (20 m)
- Surface elevation: 715 ft (218 m)
- Islands: Pierces Island
- Settlements: Spofford (town of Chesterfield)

Spofford Lake is a 732-acre (2.96 km^{2}) body of water in the town of Chesterfield in southwestern New Hampshire, United States. Water from Spofford Lake flows via Partridge Brook to the Connecticut River. In 2005 the New Hampshire Fish and Game Department named it the cleanest lake in southwestern New Hampshire, despite the amount of motor boating. The village of Spofford is located at the lake's outlet.

== History ==
A popular recreational destination during the late 19th century, the lake figured in a tragedy that received notice well outside its rural environs. On May 26, 1882, while on tour with a company organized by Clara Louise Kellogg, the 19-year-old classical pianist Herman Rietzel, already a concert veteran and considered to be well-launched on a promising career, joined George Conly, a bass singer with the company, for a pleasure outing on the lake. Later that day, their rowboat was found capsized; Reitzel's body was not recovered until the following June 7, and Conly's not until a week later.

Actor-comedian George Carlin spent several summers at Camp Notre Dame on Spofford Lake (along with SNL director Dave "Wacky" Wilson and New Yorker cartoonist Leo Cullum — the camp was owned by the Cullum family) in his childhood; after his death in 2008, he was cremated and part of his ashes were scattered in the lake.

== Recreation ==
Ware's Grove and North Shore are two municipal beaches on the lake. North Shore is for Chesterfield town residents only, while Wares Grove, near the southwest end of the lake, along New Hampshire Route 9A, has an entrance fee and is open to the general public. A state-maintained boat ramp is available to the west of Wares Grove, affording access to Pierces Island, managed by the New Hampshire Division of Forests and Lands and offering hiking trails.

Fishing is a popular recreational activity on the lake. The lake is classified as a cold- and warmwater fishery, and is known for producing quality smallmouth bass, rainbow trout, northern pike, bullhead catfish and especially largemouth bass. Rock bass were introduced to the lake in the late 1990s and have proven to be a nuisance to anglers.

== See also ==
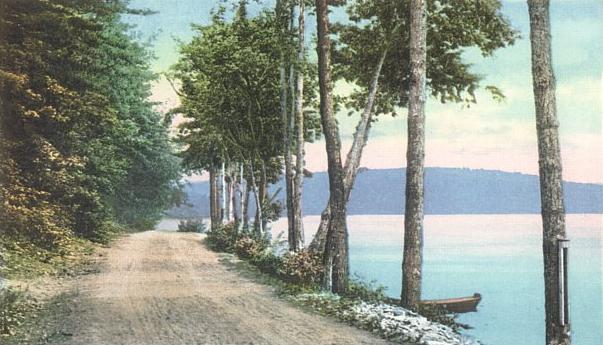
1905 postcard of Spofford Lake

- List of lakes in New Hampshire
