= Clara Louise Kellogg =

American soprano (1842–1916)

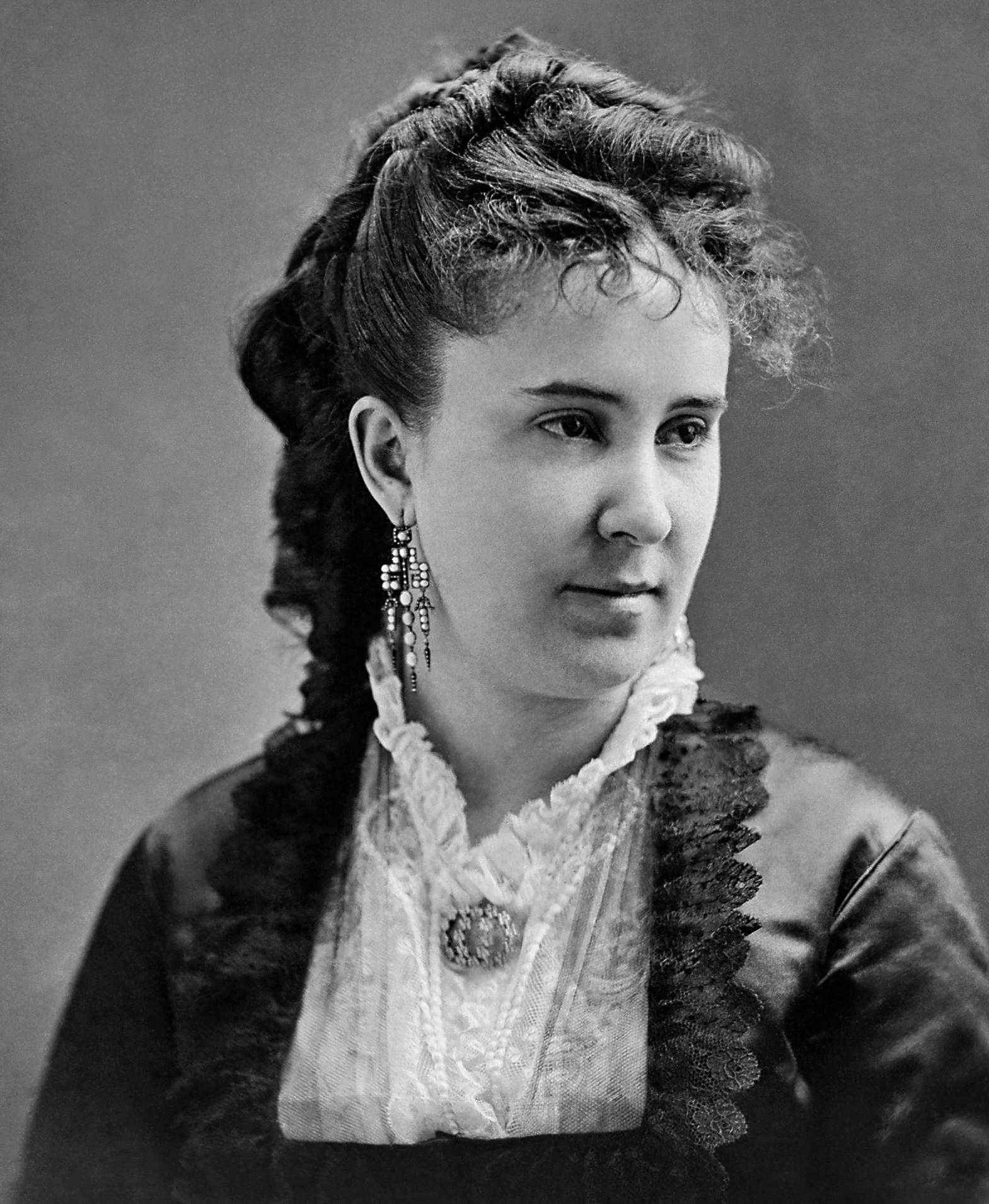
- Born: July 9, 1842; Sumterville, South Carolina, U.S.
- Died: May 13, 1916 (aged 73); New Hartford, Connecticut, U.S.
- Occupation: Singer
- Spouse: Carl Strakosch (m. 1886)
- Parent(s): George Kellogg; Jane Elizabeth Crosby

Clara Louise Kellogg (July 9, 1842 – May 13, 1916) was an American operatic dramatic soprano with a range of two and one-half octaves. Her voice in youth was a high soprano with a range from C to E flat. With age it lost some of the highest notes but gained in power and richness.

== Biography ==
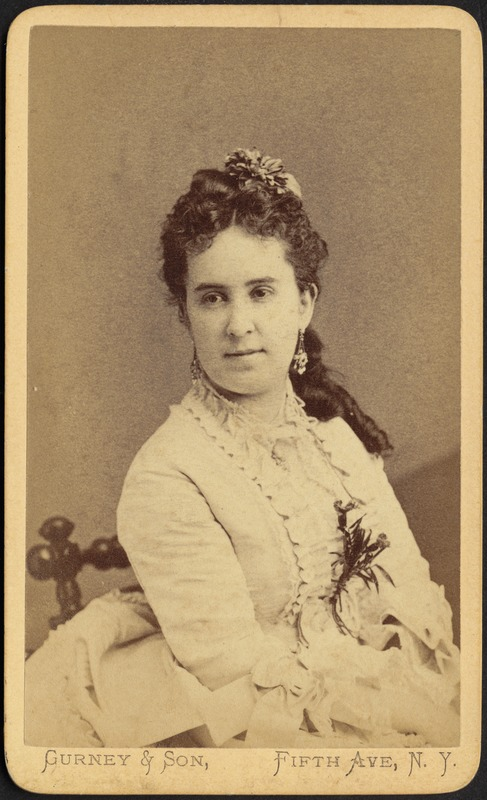
Clara Louise Kellogg, [ca. 1859–1870]. Carte de Visite Collection, Boston Public Library.

Clara Louise Kellogg was born in Sumterville, South Carolina, the daughter of Jane Elizabeth (Crosby) and George Kellogg. She received her musical training in the Academy of Music, New York City, and first sang opera there in 1861. Her fine soprano voice and artistic gifts soon made her famous. In New York and London she often performed with the pianist Anna Mehlig. She appeared as prima donna in Italian opera in London and at concerts in 1867 and 1868, and from that time till 1887 was one of the leading public singers. She appeared at intervals in London, but was principally engaged in America.

In 1874 Kellogg organized an opera company widely known in the United States, and her enterprise and energy in directing it were remarkable. The company weathered a tragedy on May 26, 1882, when two members, virtuoso pianist Herman Rietzel and bass singer George Conly, drowned on Lake Spofford while on tour.

Kellogg retired after marrying Carl Strakosch in Elkhart, Indiana, on November 6, 1886. In 1913 she published her memoirs under the title Memoirs of an American Prima Donna. She died at her home in New Hartford, Connecticut on May 13, 1916.

== See also ==
- J.N. Pattison
