= Ararat Armenian Congregational Church =

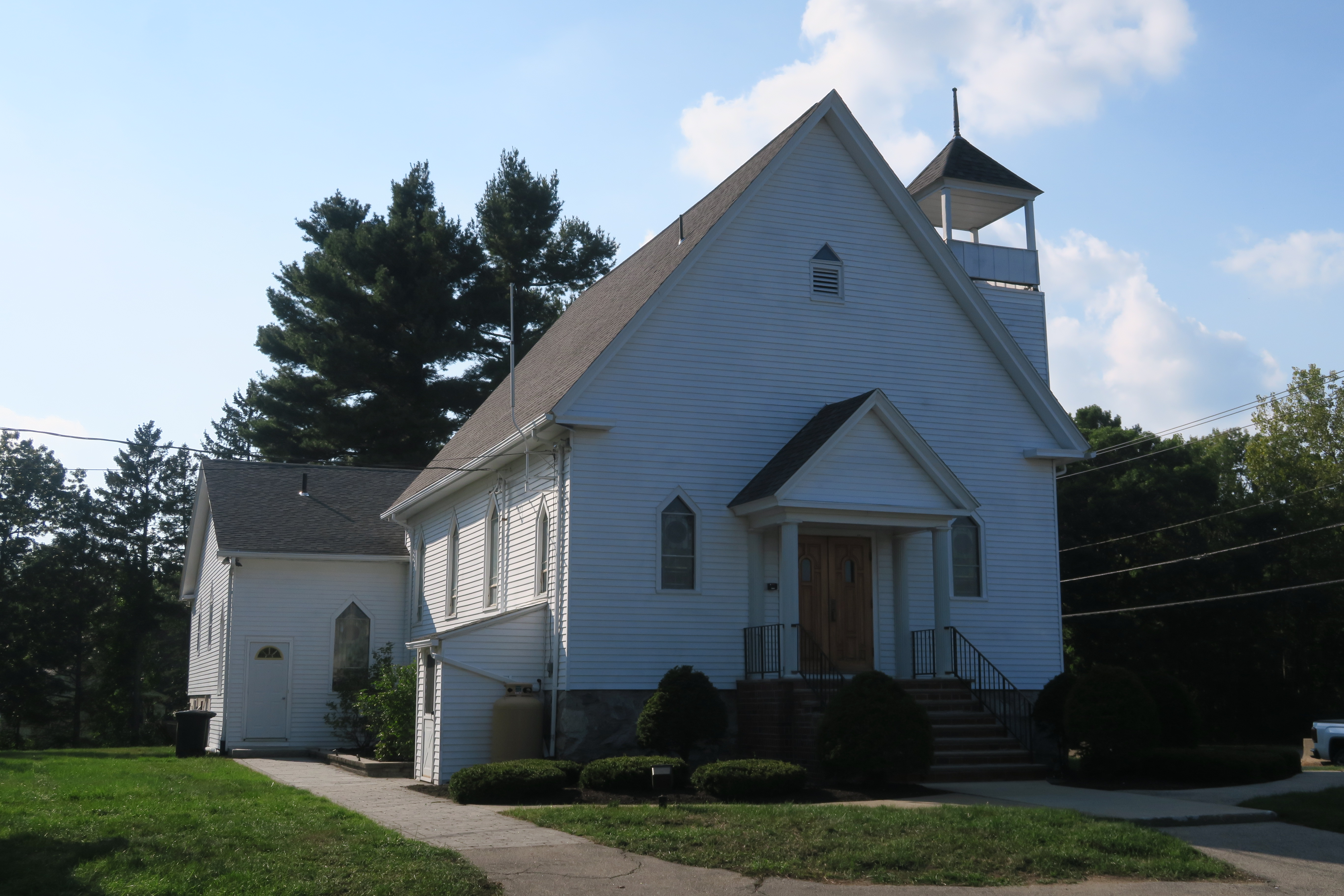

- Location in New Hampshire

Religion
- Affiliation: Armenian Evangelical

Location
- Location: 2 Salem St, Salem, New Hampshire
- Coordinates: 42.755°N 71.228°W

Architecture
- Established: 1913

The Ararat Armenian Congregational Church is an Armenian Evangelical church in Salem, New Hampshire, United States. The church is located at 2 Salem Street in Salem.

Prior to the establishment of the Ararat Armenian Congregational Church, the Bethel Armenian Congregational Church in Lawrence, Massachusetts, a mission of the Lawrence Street Congregational Church, served as the primary place of worship for the area's Armenian community. In the late 1800s and early 1900s, several Armenian families, many refugees fleeing the Ottoman Empire, began to settle in Salem, New Hampshire. Frustrated with the distance of the existing Armenian church in Lawrence, in October 1912 the Armenian population of Salem moved to establish a building committee for the creation of a new Armenian congregation within the town. The church was built on land provided by the Northeastern Street Railway Company, and construction was completed within a year. The church was dedicated on November 12, 1913.

Services were originally conducted in Armenian, and later led in English.

== See also ==
- New Hampshire Historical Marker No. 221: Armenian Settlement Salem, NH
