= Asbury United Methodist Church (Chesterfield, New Hampshire) =

Historic church in New Hampshire, United States

- U.S. National Register of Historic Places
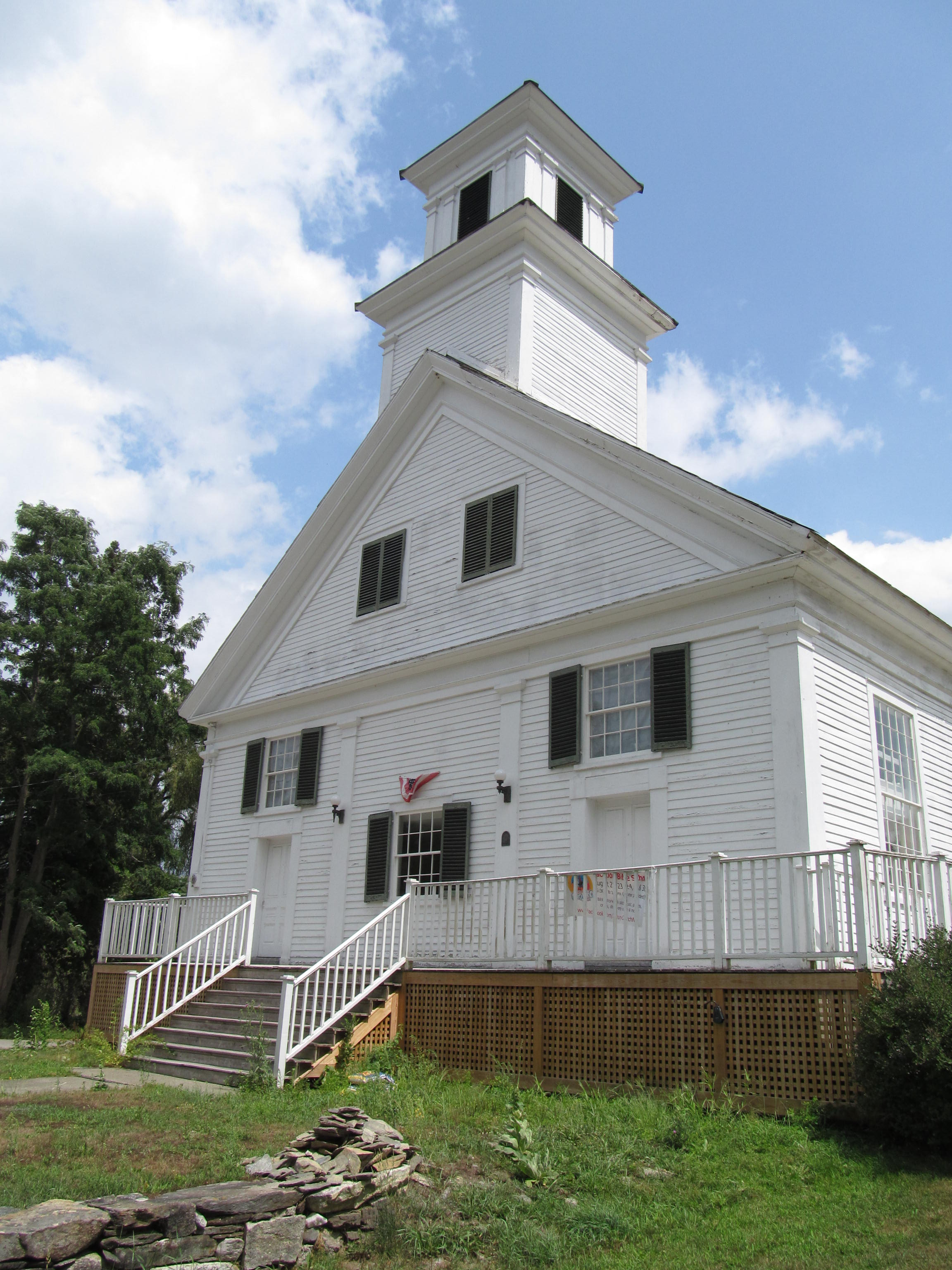

- Location within New Hampshire Location within the United States
- Location: 532 NH 63, Chesterfield, New Hampshire
- Coordinates: 42°53′17″N 72°28′14″W
- Area: less than one acre
- Built: 1844
- Built by: Coolidge, Oscar C.
- Architectural style: Greek Revival
- NRHP reference No.: 83004009
- Added to NRHP: December 21, 1983

The Asbury United Methodist Church is a historic Methodist church on NH 63 in Chesterfield, New Hampshire. It has been termed the "mother church of Methodism in New Hampshire", and is home to the state's oldest continuously running Methodist congregation, organized in 1795. The building, constructed in 1844, is a prominent local example of Greek Revival architecture, and was listed on the National Register of Historic Places in 1983.

== Description and history ==
The Asbury United Methodist Church is located in the town center of Chesterfield, on the east side of New Hampshire Route 63. It is a 1½-story wood-frame structure, rectangular in shape, with a gable roof, and a tower rising from its front (northwestern) facade. The main facade is divided into three bays by four pilasters, with entrances on the two outer bays and a window in the center. An uncovered porch extends across the facade, with a latticework railing and a broad centered stair. The tower is a two-stage square structure, the lower stage with corner pilasters, and the upper (which houses the belfry) with paired pilasters matching those on the facade.

Methodism first began to be preached in southwestern New Hampshire in 1793 by Jesse Lee, and developed a following sufficient to organize a congregation by 1795. The first Methodist circuit was known as the "Chesterfield circuit" since it was based here. This organization at first met in local homes, schools, and other church buildings, prior to the construction of this church. It was built in 1844 by contractor Oscar C. Coolidge, and bears stylistic design touches characteristic of the early works of Ammi Burnham Young, a native of Lebanon, New Hampshire.

== See also ==
- National Register of Historic Places listings in Cheshire County, New Hampshire
