= Helen Field Comstock =

American poet and philanthropist (1840–1930)

Helen Maria Field Comstock
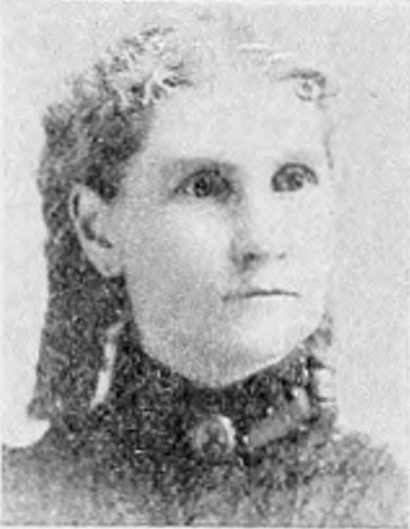
- Born: Helen Maria Field; September 3, 1840; Chesterfield, New Hampshire, U.S.
- Died: January 28, 1930 (aged 89); DeKalb, Illinois, U.S.
- Resting place: Lawnridge cemetery, Rochelle, Illinois, U.S.
- Occupations: Poet; philanthropist
- Spouse: Ransford A. Comstock (m. 1862; died 1891)
- Children: 2
- Writing career
- Pen name: Zeleta

Helen Field Comstock (née, Field; pen name, Zeleta; September 3, 1840 – January 28, 1930) was an American poet and philanthropist. Her poems were collected and published in a large volume.

== Early life and education ==
Helen Maria Field was born September 3, 1840, in Chesterfield, New Hampshire. She was the oldest of the three living children of Jesse and Hannah Field. The genealogy of the Field family went back to the early colonial times, when three brothers came from England to what became the United States, and settled in Taunton, Massachusetts, where many of their descendants stayed. The father's health was poor due to an unfortunate fall early in life, which ultimately caused his death in 1850, at the age of 39, when Helen was nine years old.

The widow kept her children in school, including the public schools and the academy in Chesterfield. When Helen was fifteen, she received a certificate to teach.

== Career ==
On 2 Jan 1862, in Shelburne Falls, Massachusetts, she married Ransford A. Comstock (d. 1891), a native of that town. Here, they made their home for ten years. Their two sons were born, in 1862 and 1867. In 1870, Mrs. Comstock removed to Rochelle, Illinois, which was her home thereafter.

For a time, she wrote under the pen name, "Zeleta", later "Helen M. Comstock", and still later, everything for publication was signed "Helen Field Comstock". Her poems appeared in various periodicals in New England and the West. She was a writer for the Chicago Tribune and other leading publications of the east and west. Her poems were incorporated in Poets of America and other standard works. They were also collected and published in a large volume, which received favorable reviews. Though she had a rather low and weak voice, Comstock was comfortable with public speaking.

== Death ==
Comstock died at the home of her son, D. A. Comstock, in DeKalb, Illinois, January 28, 1930. Interment was made in Rochelle's Lawnridge cemetery.
