= Emma Juch =

Soprano

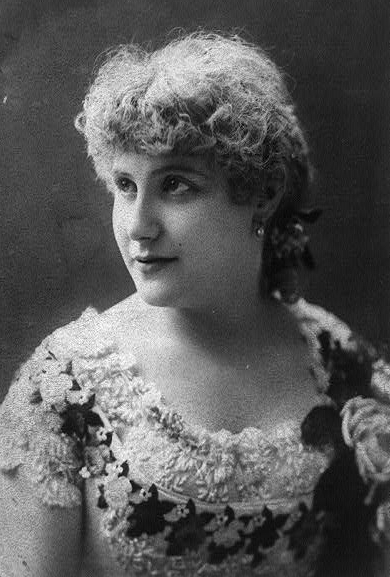
- Emma Juch in 1901
- Born: 4 July 1860; Vienna, Austria-Hungary
- Died: March 6, 1939 (aged 78); New York City, US
- Burial place: Woodlawn Cemetery, Bronx
- Other name: Emma Antonia Joanna Juch Wellman
- Occupation: Opera singer
- Spouse: Francis Lewis Wellman

Emma Johanna Antonia Juch (July 4, 1860 – March 6, 1939) was a soprano opera singer of the 1880s and 1890s from Vienna, Austria. She sang with several companies and later formed her own company.

== Early years and education ==
Emma Johanna Antonia Juch was born in Vienna, Austria-Hungary on 4 July 1860. Her parents were naturalized American citizens who were visiting Austria at the time she was born. Her father, Justin Juch (more properly, Von Juch), was a Vienna-born musician, music professor, artist, and inventor. Her mother, Augusta (Hahn) Juch, was of French Hanoverian origin. Juch's parents resided in Detroit, Michigan, and Juch was born when they returned to Austria for the settlement of the estate of Juch's grandfather, General Von Juch. Juch was also of Italian descent.

Juch's parents returned to the United States when Juch was still an infant. She was raised in New York City, where she attended public school course and graduated from the Normal School in 1879.

Her singing ability was inherited from her maternal grandmother and her mother, who were both gifted singers. Martin Juch at first disapproved of a professional musical career for his daughter, so Juch took lessons and practiced secretly. She studied for three years with Adelina Murio-Celli d‘Elpeux, and made her debut in a concert in Chickering Hall. When her father heard his daughter sing at this concert, he experienced a change of heart and thereafter encouraged her and supervised her training.

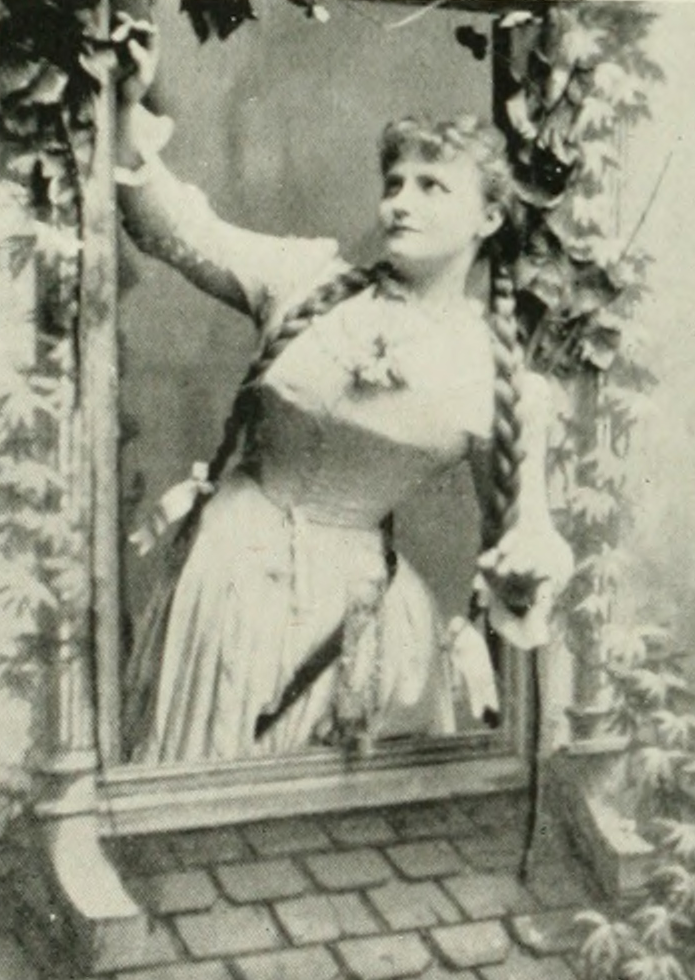
Emma Juch, ca. 1893.

== Musical career ==
Juch was admired in the United States and England during a grand opera and concert career spanning thirteen years. Biographer Oscar Thompson wrote of Juch that "her voice was one of unusually lovely quality and extraordinary purity." She could sing in four different languages, but her singing in English was especially praised for its clarity. Juch also sang proficiently in German, Italian, and French.

She made her debut as Philine in Mignon in June 1881 two months after Colonel James Henry Mapleson engaged her to sing leading soprano roles in Her Majesty's Grand Italian Opera in London, England. She made her United States debut in October of the same year at the Academy of Music in New York City.

She subsequently appeared as Violetta in Verdi's La traviata, as Queen of Night in Mozart'sThe Magic Flute, as Martha in Flotow's Martha, as Marguerite in Gounod's Faust, as the Queen in Meyerbeer's Les Huguenots, and as Isabella in Meyerbeer's Robert le Diable. She sang during three seasons under Colonel Mapleson's management. When her contract lapsed, she refused to renew it.

In June 1882, she received favorable notices when she returned to New York to take part in a memorial concert to raise funds for the families of operatic bass George Conly and virtuoso pianist Herman Rietzel, both recently drowned in a boating accident.

After her contract with Col. Mapleson lapsed, William Steinway introduced her to conductor Theodore Thomas, and she accepted an offer to tour with the Wagnerian artists Amalie Materna, Christina Nilsson, Hermann Winkelmann, and Emil Scaria. Juch sang alternate nights with Nilsson as Elsa in Wagner's Lohengrin.

Juch was the first singer contracted by the American Opera Company in 1886. During three seasons with that company, she sang in six roles on over 150 occasions. The operas presented included The Magic Flute, Faust, Gluck's Orpheus and Eurydice, Rubinstein's Nero, and Wagner's Lohengrin and The Flying Dutchman.

When American Opera Company dissolved, she formed the Emma Juch Grand English Opera Company, which toured the United States and Mexico. Her company opened in Faust at the Grand Opera House in Los Angeles on the night of January 6, 1890. Juch sang in four of the seven operas performed by the company, which had been on tour for ten weeks. The New York World complimented her on making great strides in singing the part of Marguerite since her tenure with the American Opera Company. A critic said "her impersonation of Marguerite is most delicate and charming," and particularly "the garden scene, most poetic."

Juch designed some of her costumes herself.

The Library of Congress holds one recording from 1904 (see External Links).

== Personal life ==
Juch married Francis Lewis Wellman, a lawyer, on 25 June 1894 in Stamford, Connecticut. She gave up her career after her marriage. Juch and Wellman divorced in 1911.

== Death ==
Juch died at her home, 151 East 80th Street, in New York City, in 1939. She was 78 and suffered a cerebral hemorrhage while at a movie theater. Juch had not performed in public for nearly forty-four years before her death.
