= Nevers' 2nd Regiment Band =

- Nevers' Band logo

Background information
- Origin: Third New Hampshire Regiment
- Genres: Concert band
- Years active: 1861–present
- Website: www.neversband.org

Founded during the Civil War as part of a Union Army regiment, Nevers' Band is one of the oldest continuing musical organizations in New Hampshire and one of the oldest bands in the United States. Though originally a 24-member, nearly all-brass band typical of mid-19th century ensembles, it has evolved since into a slightly larger organization of standard, modern concert band instrumentation. Its compound name derives from its last military affiliation with the Second Regiment of the New Hampshire National Guard until 1898 and its direction for more than half a century by Claremont cornetist Arthur Nevers.

Nevers' 2nd Regiment Band in 2005

== History ==
=== Formation and Civil War history ===
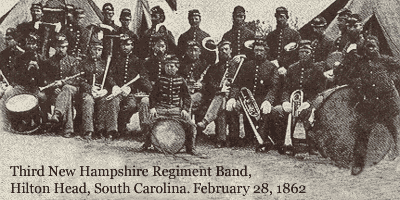
3rd New Hampshire Regiment Band - Hilton Head, South Carolina. February 28, 1862

New Hampshire Governor Nathaniel S. Berry established the band as part of the Third New Hampshire Regiment on July 31, 1861, by an executive order to Gustavus W. Ingalls of Concord. The nucleus of the band's 24 members came from a cornet band organized in 1858 under D. Arthur Brown in Fisherville, now known as Penacook or Ward I of the city of Concord. Ingalls himself was a violinist, an associate for many years with A. Prescott and Co. of Concord (makers of organs and pianos) and, until the war, leader of the Concord Brass Band.

Upon its formation, the Third Regiment Band was sent promptly to participate in the siege of Charleston Harbor at Hilton Head, South Carolina, but did not remain long. Following a War Department order discontinuing all but brigade bands in 1862, Ingalls and his musicians had to return to New Hampshire. In 1863, however, Ingalls was able to reorganize most of his original band and return to South Carolina as director of what became known as the Hilton Head Post Band, because the players' salaries were derived from the mail fund. Band members also performed extra-musical duties in the hospital corps, attending to the sick, the wounded, and the dead.

Like its short-lived predecessor, the band gained an excellent reputation. It was therefore the one honored to play patriotic tunes as well as the national anthem during a nationally symbolic flag-raising ceremony on April 14, 1865, celebrating the recapture of Fort Sumter at the war's conclusion.

Part books used by the band during the war remain in the Library of Congress, in the New Hampshire Historical Society in Concord, and in the New Hampshire Antiquarian Society in Hopkinton. They are recognized by knowledgeable researchers to contain some of the finest band arrangements of popular mid-19th century music, and they therefore have been used repeatedly in recent period instrument recordings of the repertoire.

=== Return to Concord ===
After the war, the band returned to Concord and continued as the Third Regiment Band of New Hampshire, and it also became associated until 1898, with the Second Regiment of the New Hampshire National Guard. Since then it has remained a professional civilian community band, but its military origins have always flavored its history and traditions.

Ingalls yielded leadership of the band in 1879 to J. Wilkins Hall, who, in turn, passed the baton in 1881 to Dorchester native Henri Blaisdell. A prominent musical figure in the Concord region, Blaisdell also organized an orchestra, prepared chamber and symphony concerts, conducted a grand festival in April 1892 and was choirmaster for a time at St. Paul's Church in Concord.

Blaisdell sought able musicians for his band and orchestra and succeeded in securing two particularly talented members. For several years, the orchestra included Edwin Eugene Bagley, originally of Craftsbury, Vermont, later of Keene, New Hampshire, and composer of the famous "National Emblem March". In 1882, Blaisdell also engaged the virtuoso Claremont native Arthur F. Nevers as cornetist and soloist. Nevers promptly became the orchestra's business manager.

=== Direction by Arthur Nevers ===
Arthur F. Nevers

Blaisdell then turned his attention elsewhere and appointed Nevers as bandmaster of the Third Regiment Band in 1884. Nevers also established his own orchestra (Nevers' Second Regiment Orchestra), and with both groups he played at many notable events. He composed several marches and light numbers as well, which remain in the band's repertoire. Blaisdell reported in 1893 that "Mr. Nevers has refused many flattering offers to join other organizations, preferring to remain with Blaisdell's orchestra and the Third Regiment (Band)." In fact, Nevers conducted the band until his death in 1940 at age 79, for a remarkable span of 56 years.

Distinguished performances by the band in this century began with a two-day ceremony in 1900 for the dedication of the battleship USS Alabama and the 1905 signing of the Russo-Japanese Peace Treaty, both in Portsmouth, New Hampshire. Other events included Dartmouth College commencements, annual performances at St. Paul's School, the Lancaster fairs, concerts at Mount Sunapee State Park, and the 150th and 200th anniversaries of many towns and cities. In addition, the band played by his own request for the funeral of former Mayor Storrs of Concord, as well as for a ceremony in the State House Hall of Flags upon the death of former U. S. senator Styles Bridges.

=== Recent conductors ===
Paul T. Giles

In the half-century since the passing of Arthur Nevers, the band has continued under the baton of seven conductors. In 1940, former State Senator and Concord Mayor Herbert W. Rainie assumed directorship of what by then had become known as Nevers' Second Regiment Band, and he served until 1950. James D. Bell directed for the following decade. Paul T. Giles, clarinetist in the band and assistant director under Bell, served as director for a notable 25 years from 1960 until 1985. Douglas L. Osborne, another clarinetist with the band for the previous 21 years, directed from 1985 to 1989. The band's first woman conductor was Maryanne Sisk, a trumpet player with the band for three years and conductor from 1989 to 1992. Richard C. Spicer served as the band's tenth conductor from 1992 to 1996, under whose leadership the band established its statewide Solo/Apprenticeship Competition for New Hampshire high school students. Jiffi Rainie assumed conductorship from 1996-2000 and again in 2002. Jiffi, longtime french horn player with the band, is the daughter of Dr. Robert Rainie, who has been a member of the band for over 45 years. Jiffi's grandfather, Herbert W. Rainie, was the band's fifth conductor. Douglas Osborne served as the band's interim conductor in 2001, and recently from 2003 through 2008. Osborne had recently retired from a 30-year career in music education where he spent the bulk of his time in the Merrimack Valley School District. In 2009 a season long search for a new conductor resulted in a series of conductors leading the band. In 2010 Richard Cook took over leadership until 2012. In 2013 Phil Martin and Kevin Swift shared the role of conductor. In 2014 Kevin Swift took over full conducting duties and remains the conductor.

== See also ==
- New Hampshire Historical Marker No. 223: Home Site of Nathaniel Berry Governor, 1861–1863
