= Spofford, New Hampshire =

Unincorporated community in New Hampshire, United States

- Unincorporated community
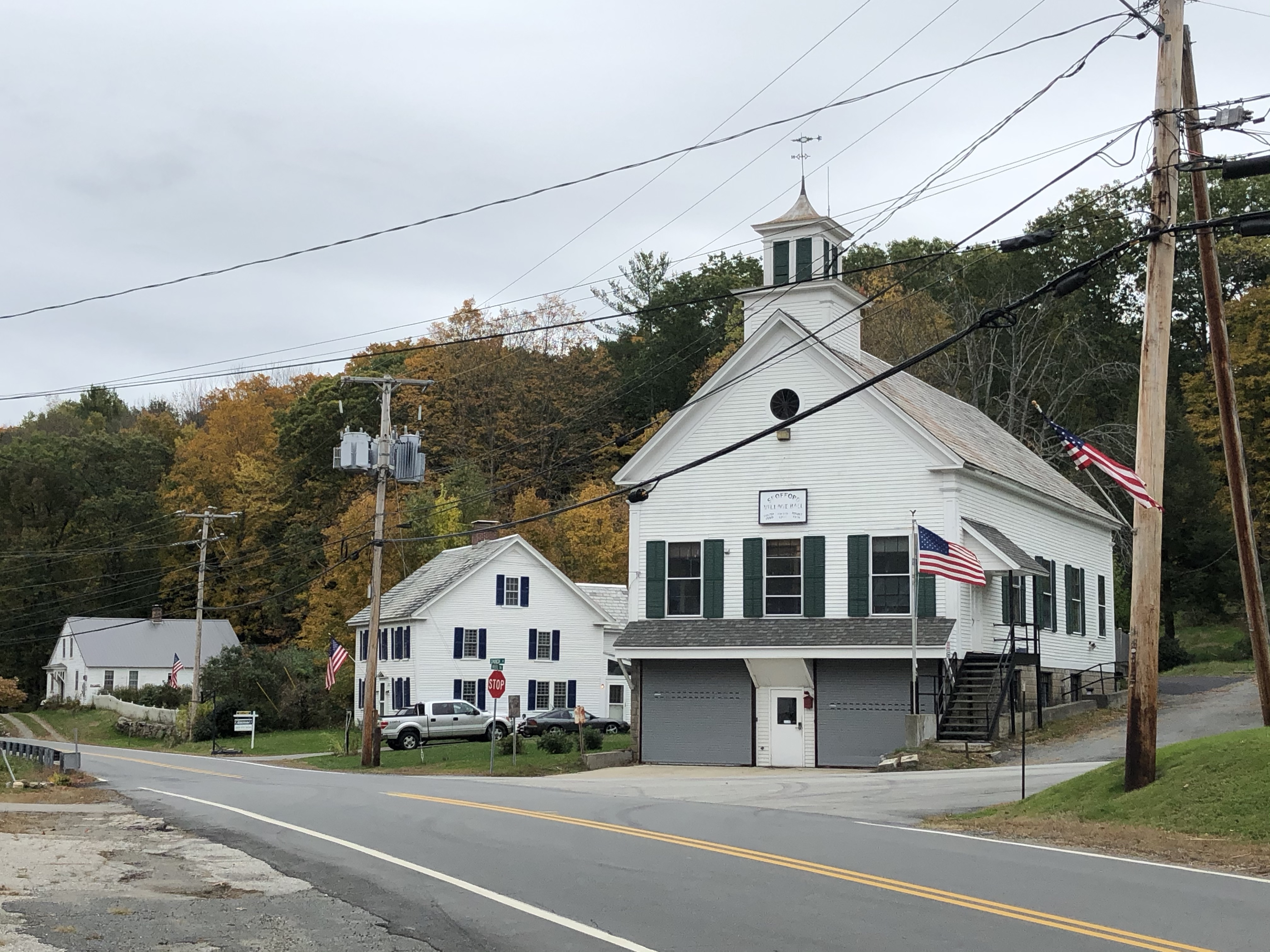
- Spofford Village Hall

- Location within New Hampshire Location within the United States
- Coordinates: 42°54′25″N 72°25′12″W
- Country: United States
- State: New Hampshire
- County: Cheshire
- Town: Chesterfield
- Elevation: 689 ft (210 m)
- Time zone: UTC-5 (Eastern (EST))
  - Summer (DST): UTC-4 (EDT)
- ZIP code: 03462
- Area code: 603
- GNIS feature ID: 870092

Spofford is an unincorporated community in the northeastern part of the town of Chesterfield in Cheshire County, New Hampshire, United States. It is situated at the outlet of Spofford Lake and is located along New Hampshire Route 9A. While no population figures are available for Spofford, it is slightly larger than the town-center village of Chesterfield. Children who live in Spofford go to Chesterfield School. Spofford has a different ZIP code (03462) from the rest of Chesterfield.

Home to Spofford Lake, there are two different beaches to visit. On Route 9A there is Ware's Grove Beach where out-of-town visitors can pay $6 for a day pass or $125 for a season pass. The other is North Shore Beach on North Shore Road, which is open to town residents only.

In the middle of Spofford Lake lies Pierce Island, a state park.

== Notable people ==
- George Carlin, stand-up comedian and actor; some of Carlin's ashes were spread at the lake after his death. He went to Camp Notre Dame in Spofford when he was young.

== Gallery ==
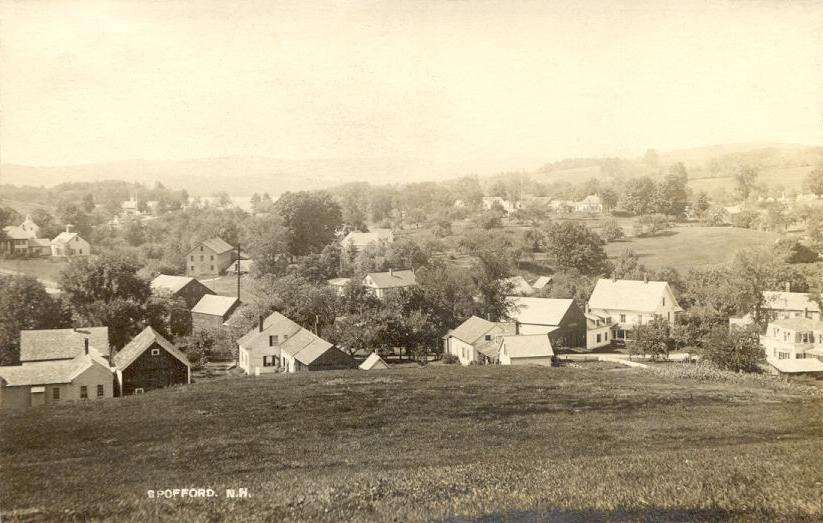
Bird's-eye view c. 1912

== See also ==
- New Hampshire Historical Marker No. 216: Pierce Shops
