= Pawtuckaway =

Pawtuckaway can refer to:

- Pawtuckaway Lake, in Nottingham, New Hampshire
- Pawtuckaway River, in Rockingham County, New Hampshire
- Pawtuckaway State Park, in Rockingham County, New Hampshire
