= George Kellogg (inventor) =

- Born: June 19, 1812; New Hartford, Connecticut
- Died: 1901 (aged 88–89); United States
- Occupation: Inventor
- Spouse: Jane Elizabeth Crosby (1816-1892)
- Children: Clara Louise Kellogg
- Parent(s): Isaac Kellogg; Auriila Barney

George Kellogg (June 19, 1812 – 1901) was an American inventor and patent expert.

Kellogg was born in New Hartford, Connecticut in 1812 to Isaac Kellogg (1782–1824) and Aurilla Barney (1792–1861). George graduated from Wesleyan University in 1837. From 1838 to 1841, he was principal of the Sumter Academy in Sumterville, South Carolina. He was for some time a manufacturer in Birmingham, Connecticut, and was in the United States revenue service from 1863 to 1866. He established factories in England, was a patent expert, and patented a machine for making jack chains (1844), a dovetailing machine (1849), a type-distributing machine (1852), and improved surgical instruments (1853). He married Jane Elizabeth Crosby (1816–1892) and had a child, Clara Louise Kellogg.
