= Chesterfield Gorge Natural Area =

State park in New Hampshire, US

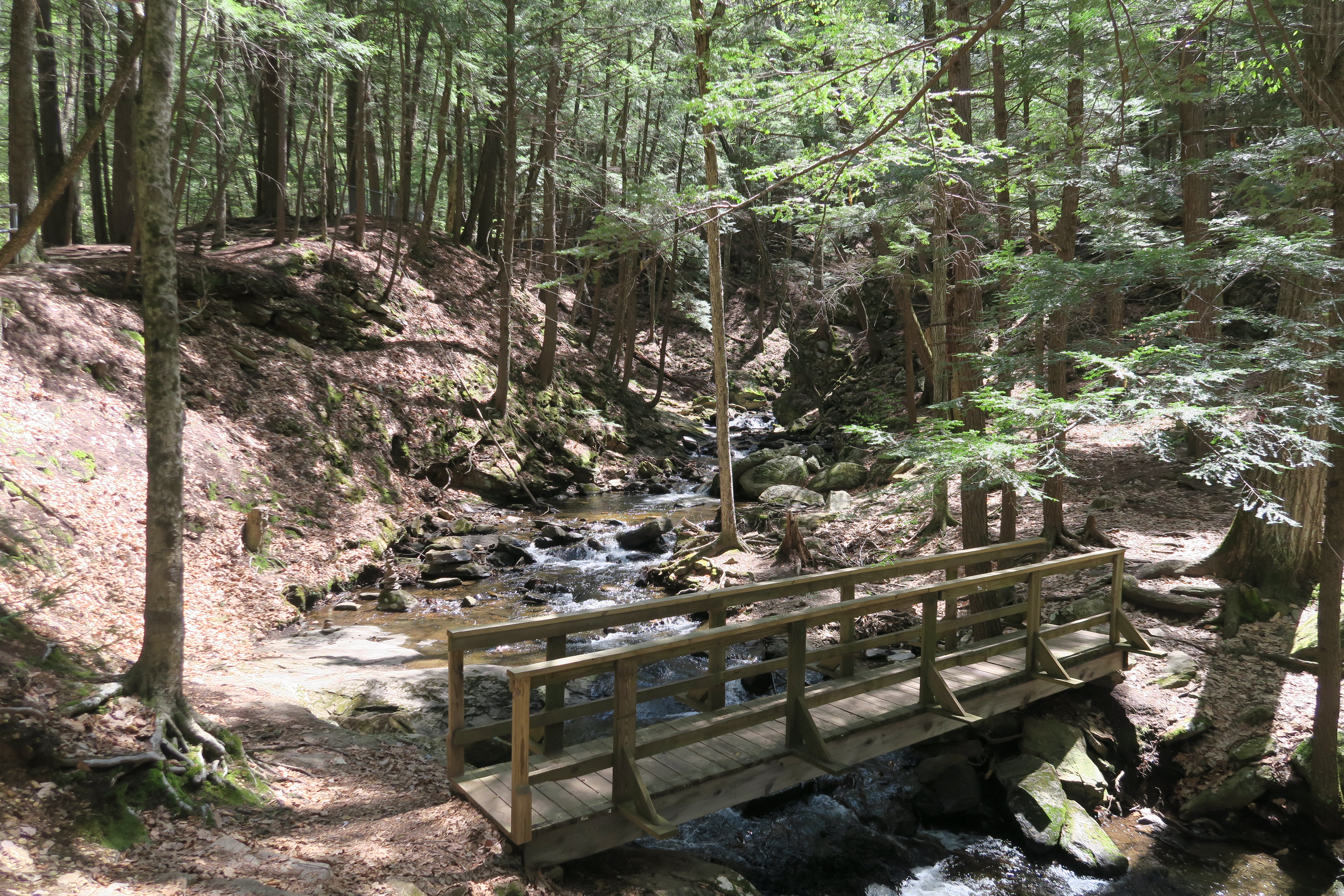
- Footbridge over Partridge Brook

- Location within New Hampshire
- Interactive map of Chesterfield Gorge Natural Area
- Location: 1823 Route 9, Chesterfield, New Hampshire, United States
- Coordinates: 42°54′52″N 72°24′16″W
- Area: 13 acres (5.3 ha)
- Elevation: 712 ft (217 m)
- Established: 1948
- Administrator: New Hampshire Division of Parks and Recreation
- Website: Official website
- New Hampshire State Parks

Chesterfield Gorge Natural Area, also known as Chesterfield Gorge State Wayside, is a 13-acre (5.3 ha) state park on Route 9 in Chesterfield, New Hampshire. The park conserves a rocky gorge with waterfalls on Wilde Brook. There is picnicking, a seasonal visitor center, and 0.7-mile (1.1 km) trail on either side of the brook.

The park owes its existence to local farmer George White, who bought the gorge in 1936 to protect it from clear-cut loggers. White sold 15 acres (6.1 ha) to the Society for the Protection of New Hampshire Forests, which then donated the land to the state. As Chesterfield Gorge Wayside Picnic Area, the park dates from 1948.

== Gallery ==
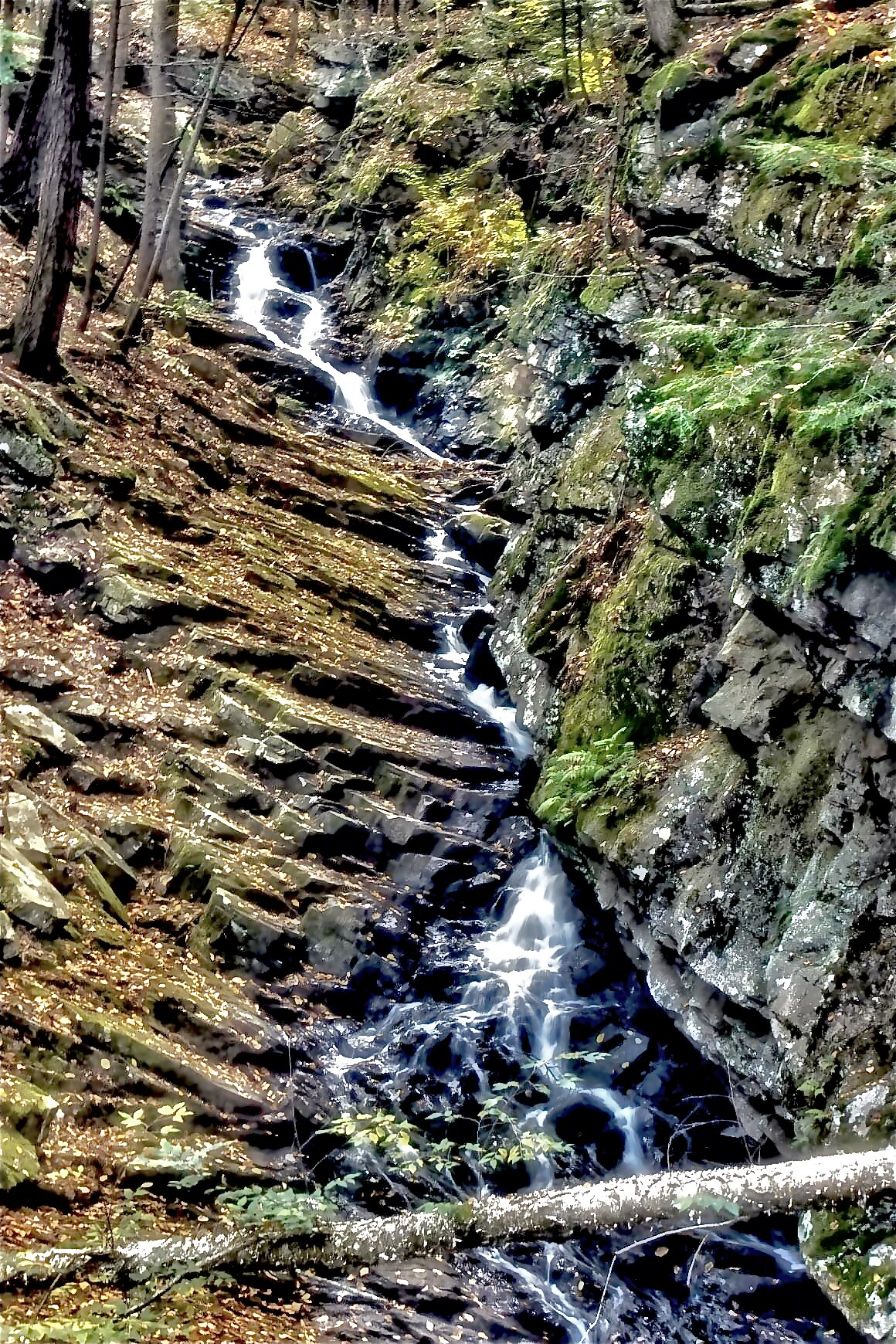
Gorge Overview

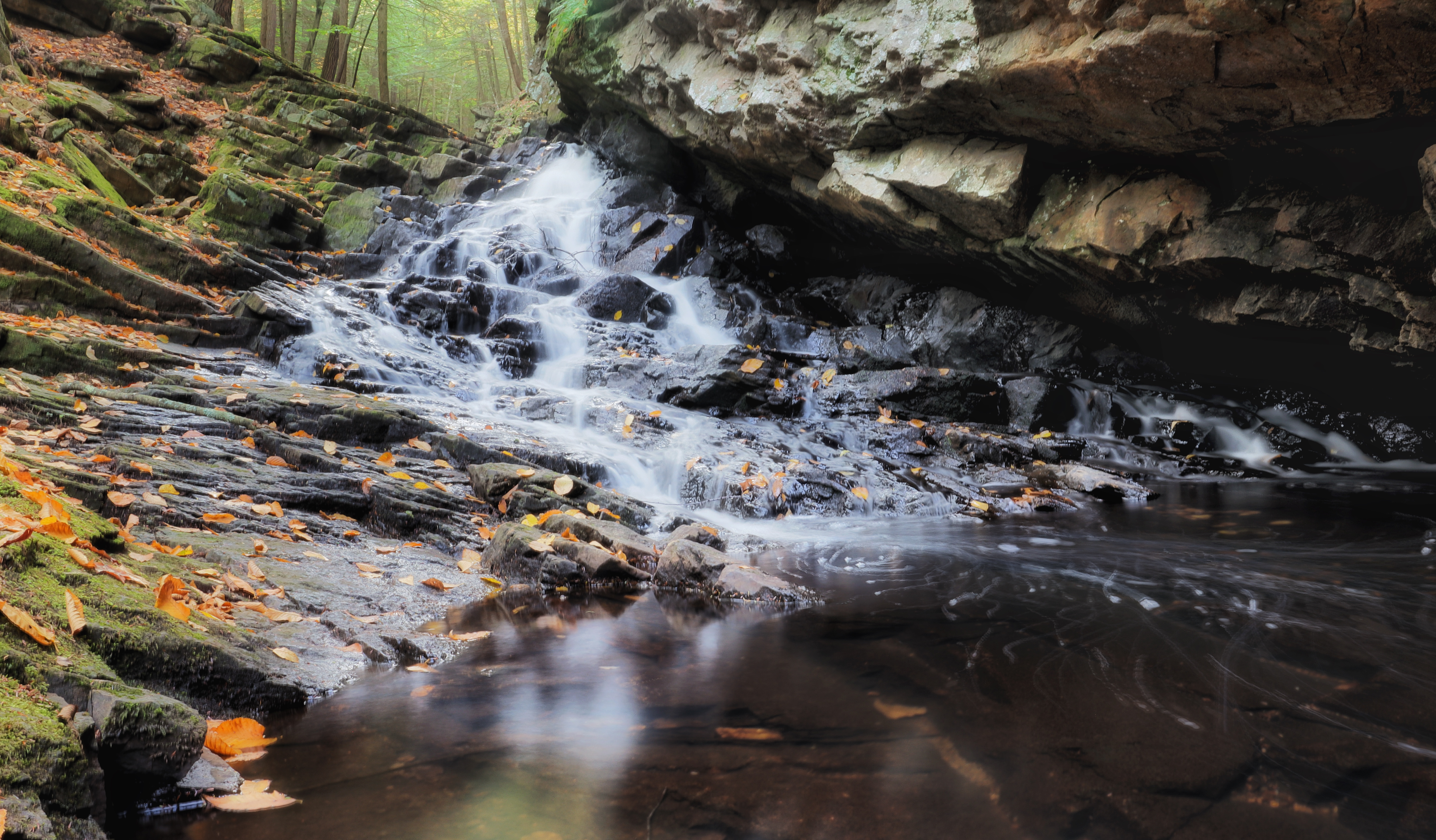
Lower Falls
