= Chesterfield, New Hampshire =

Town in New Hampshire, United States

- Town
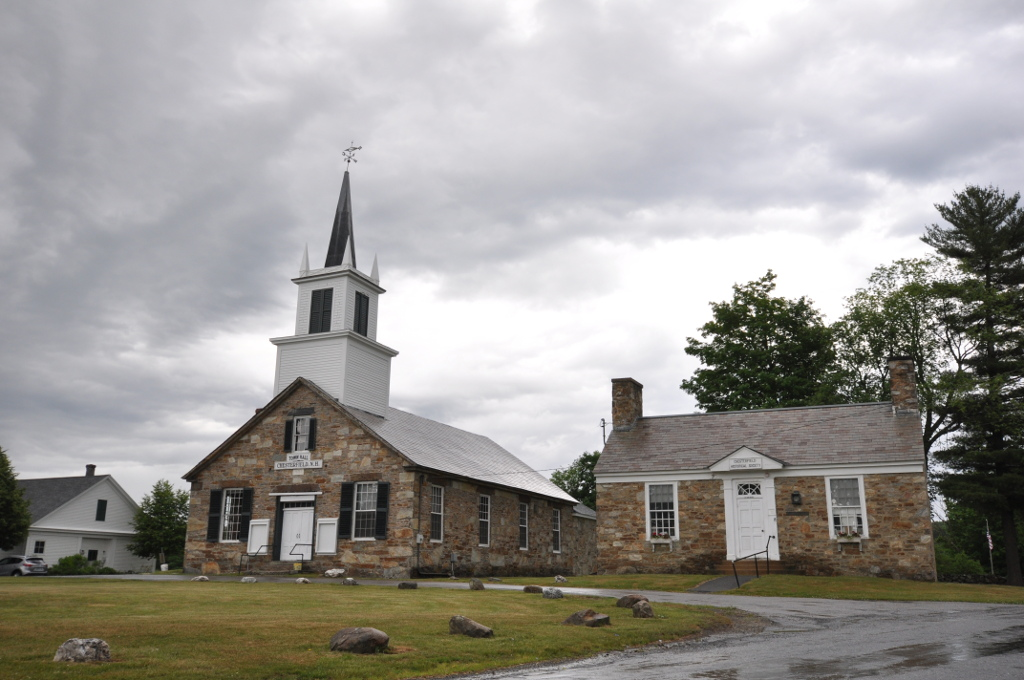
- Town hall and historical society

- Seal

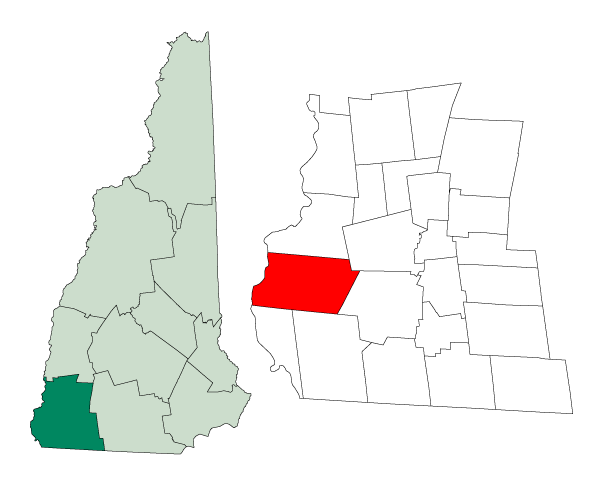
- Location in Cheshire County, New Hampshire
- Coordinates: 42°53′14″N 72°28′13″W
- Country: United States
- State: New Hampshire
- County: Cheshire
- Incorporated: 1752
- Villages: Chesterfield; Spofford; West Chesterfield

Area
  - Total: 47.5 sq mi (123.1 km^{2})
  - Land: 45.6 sq mi (118.0 km^{2})
  - Water: 2.0 sq mi (5.1 km^{2}) 4.17%
- Elevation: 984 ft (300 m)

Population (2020)
  - Total: 3,552
  - Density: 78/sq mi (30.1/km^{2})
- Time zone: UTC-5 (Eastern)
  - Summer (DST): UTC-4 (Eastern)
- ZIP codes: 03443 (Chesterfield); 03462 (Spofford); 03466 (West Chesterfield)
- Area code: 603
- FIPS code: 33-12260
- GNIS feature ID: 873565
- Website: www.chesterfield.nh.gov

Chesterfield is a town in Cheshire County, New Hampshire, United States. The population was 3,552 at the 2020 census, and an estimated 3,684 in 2025. It includes the villages of Spofford and West Chesterfield. Chesterfield is home to Spofford Lake, Chesterfield Gorge Natural Area, and parts of Pisgah State Park and Wantastiquet Mountain State Forest.

== History ==
Granted in 1735 by Governor Jonathan Belcher of Massachusetts, this town was the site of Fort Number 1, first in the line of forts bordering the Connecticut River. After the border between Massachusetts and New Hampshire was fixed, the town was incorporated on February 11, 1752 by Governor Benning Wentworth as Chesterfield, named for Philip Stanhope, 4th Earl of Chesterfield. The first settlers were Moses Smith and William Thomas, who, with their families, came up the Connecticut in canoes, in the fall of 1761. Their chief subsistence through the winter and spring of their first year in the wilderness consisted of salmon and shad, of which there was a great abundance in the river, and deer, which were numerous in the forests. The town contains some of the finest farmland in Cheshire County, yet once was also home to small manufacturing, notably spinning wheel parts and hand tools.

In 1772, Philip Embury conducted the first Methodist religious services in New Hampshire at the James Robertson farm in Chesterfield, and in 1803, Francis Asbury preached here. Asbury Church is listed on the National Register of Historic Places and is recognized for its historic puritan design. Asbury Church is considered the "Mother Church of Methodism" in New Hampshire, and is the oldest Methodist church in the state. The town has had continual Methodist Sunday services for over 225 years.

Chesterfield Academy, established in 1794, was for decades one of the most celebrated in the state. Spofford Lake is one of the region's largest and oldest resorts.

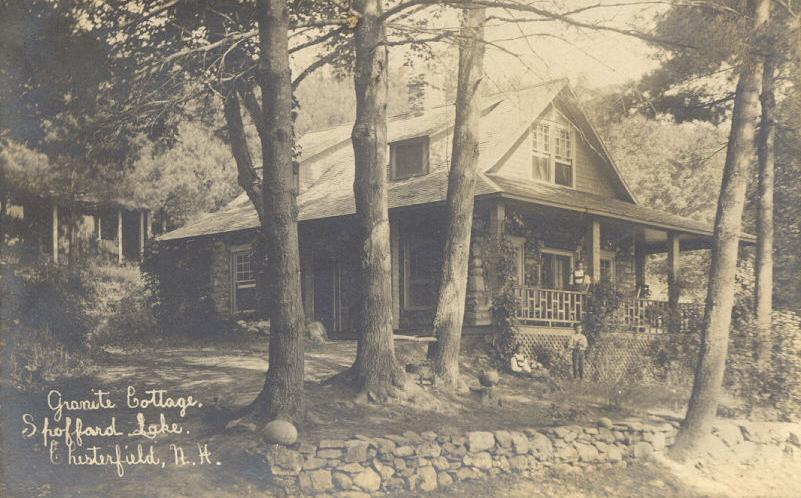
Granite Cottage in 1907, Spofford Lake

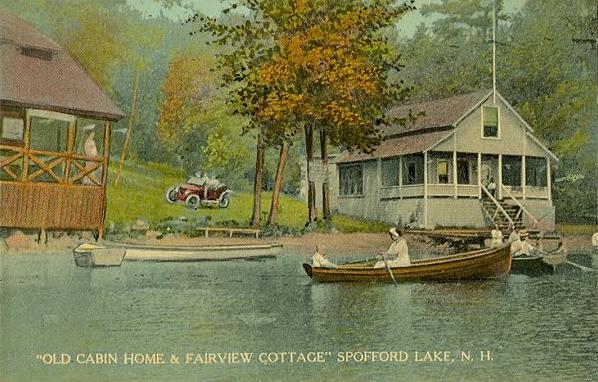
Summer cottages on Spofford Lake in 1917

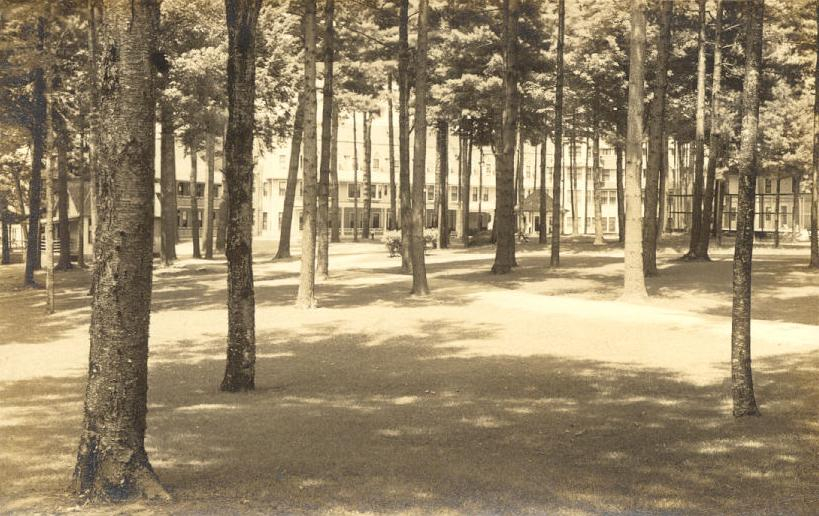
Pine Grove Springs Hotel, Spofford Lake in 1913

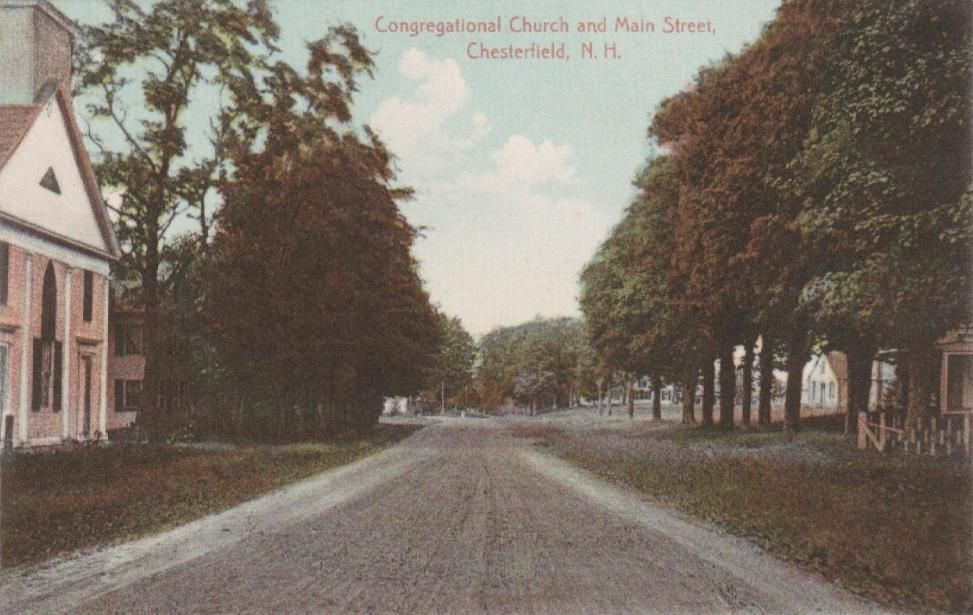
Main Street in 1909

== Geography ==
According to the United States Census Bureau, the town has a total area of 47.5 square miles (123.1 km^{2}), of which 45.6 square miles (118.0 km^{2}) are land and 2.0 square miles (5.1 km^{2}), or 4.17%, are water. Chesterfield is bounded on the west by the Connecticut River. The highest point in the town is near its southern border, atop Davis Hill, at 1,427 feet (435 m) above sea level. Chesterfield lies fully within the Connecticut River watershed.

The town is served by state routes 9 and 63.

=== Adjacent municipalities ===
- Westmoreland (north)
- Keene (northeast)
- Swanzey (east)
- Winchester (south)
- Hinsdale (south)
- Brattleboro, Vermont (southwest)
- Dummerston, Vermont (west)

== Demographics ==
Historical population
| Census | Pop. | Note | %± |
|---|---|---|---|
| 1790 | 1,905 | | — |
| 1800 | 2,161 | | 13.4% |
| 1810 | 1,839 | | −14.9% |
| 1820 | 2,110 | | 14.7% |
| 1830 | 2,040 | | −3.3% |
| 1840 | 1,765 | | −13.5% |
| 1850 | 1,680 | | −4.8% |
| 1860 | 1,434 | | −14.6% |
| 1870 | 1,289 | | −10.1% |
| 1880 | 1,173 | | −9.0% |
| 1890 | 1,046 | | −10.8% |
| 1900 | 981 | | −6.2% |
| 1910 | 770 | | −21.5% |
| 1920 | 601 | | −21.9% |
| 1930 | 704 | | 17.1% |
| 1940 | 591 | | −16.1% |
| 1950 | 970 | | 64.1% |
| 1960 | 1,405 | | 44.8% |
| 1970 | 1,817 | | 29.3% |
| 1980 | 2,561 | | 40.9% |
| 1990 | 3,112 | | 21.5% |
| 2000 | 3,542 | | 13.8% |
| 2010 | 3,604 | | 1.8% |
| 2020 | 3,552 | | −1.4% |
| 2024 (est.) | 3,660 | | 3.0% |
U.S. Decennial Census

As of the census of 2000, there were 3,542 people, 1,366 households, and 1,005 families residing in the town. The population density was 77.7 inhabitants per square mile (30.0/km^{2}). There were 1,632 housing units at an average density of 35.8 per square mile (13.8/km^{2}). The racial makeup of the town was 97.80% White, 0.23% African American, 0.56% Native American, 0.17% Asian, 0.08% from other races, and 1.16% from two or more races. Hispanic or Latino of any race were 0.56% of the population.

There were 1,366 households, out of which 32.7% had children under the age of 18 living with them, 63.5% were married couples living together, 6.9% had a female householder with no husband present, and 26.4% were non-families. 20.4% of all households were made up of individuals, and 6.6% had someone living alone who was 65 years of age or older. The average household size was 2.59 and the average family size was 3.01.

In the town, the population was spread out, with 25.9% under the age of 18, 4.9% from 18 to 24, 27.9% from 25 to 44, 30.4% from 45 to 64, and 10.9% who were 65 years of age or older. The median age was 40 years. For every 100 females, there were 103.8 males. For every 100 females age 18 and over, there were 100.2 males.

The median income for a household in the town was $51,351, and the median income for a family was $58,516. Males had a median income of $44,087 versus $26,547 for females. The per capita income for the town was $25,051. About 4.9% of families and 4.5% of the population were below the poverty line, including 4.5% of those under age 18 and 6.4% of those age 65 or over.

== Sites of interest ==
- Asbury Church (1844)
- Chesterfield Gorge Natural Area
- Pisgah State Park
- Madam Sherri Forest

== Notable people ==
- Helen Field Comstock (1840–1930), poet, philanthropist
- Theodore Davis (c. 1778–1841), merchant, surveyor, politician
- William H. Haile (1833–1901), businessman, politician
- Broughton Harris (1822–1899), Vermont newspaper editor; Secretary of Utah Territory
- Larkin Goldsmith Mead (1835–1910), sculptor who worked in a neoclassical style
- John Davis Pierce (1797–1882), educator
- George Randall (1832–1908), politician in Canadian province of Ontario
- Harlan Fiske Stone (1872–1946), 52nd Attorney General and 12th Chief Justice of the United States
- Winthrop E. Stone (1862–1921), professor, college president
- Charles Tazewell (1900–1972), actor, radio playwright, children's book author
- Hoyt Henry Wheeler (1833–1906), judge
