= Indianapolis May Festival =

Classical music event held from 1889 to 1898

The Indianapolis May Festival was a classical music festival held in Indianapolis, Indiana, United States. Ten annual festivals were held between the years 1889 and 1898.

== History ==
The Indianapolis May Festival (IMF) was established after a successful "Indiana Music Festival" was held at the grand opening of Tomlinson Hall (TH) in 1886. The TH was inaugurated on June 2, 1886, as a part of the Grand Army of the Republic Music Festival that raised money for the construction of the Soldiers' and Sailors' Monument. This event included a performance of Rossini's Stabat Mater with a 600 member chorus, an orchestra, and Lilli Lehmann as a guest soloist. As a result of the success of this event a May Music Festival Association was established to create a festival for Indianapolis that was modeled after the Cincinnati May Festival (CMF). The CMF was in turn based on the sängerfests in Germany.

Carl Barus (1823–1908) served as the first music director of the IMF; leading both the 1889 and 1890 festivals. The first festival opened on May 27, 1889, with the opening piece of the festival being the Leonore Overture from Beethoven's opera Fidelio. Guest musicians on the first program included pianist Adele aus der Ohe, cellist and conductor Victor Herbert, tenor Jules Perotti, and soprano Emma Juch. The 1890 IMF included a performance of Giuseppe Verdi's Requiem. Singers who appeared as soloists at the festival that year included Clementine de Vere, Therese Förster Herbert, Perotti, Charles A. Knorr, Charles Holman-Black, Emil Fischer, and Zelda Seguin Wallace.

When Theodore Thomas took over as director of the 1891 festival, Barus remained on an his assistant. Barus also serverd as conductor of the festival chorus in 1892. The 1891 IMF included a performance of Gioachino Rossini's Stabat Mater, and performances with concert violinist Franz Wilczek. Vocal soloists new to the IMF in 1891 included soprano Mary Howe, tenor William Lavin, and contralto Clara Poole King. Walter Damrosch brought the New York Symphony Orchestra to the 1892 IMF, which also featured performances by Thomas's orchestra. Soloists new to the festival that year included sopranos Anna Burch, Emma Fursch-Madi, and Margaret Reid. One of the concerts at the 1895 IMF included an all-Wagner program with tenor William H. Rieger and soprano Lillian Nordica.

Other soloists participating in IMF concerts in the 1890s included Nellie Melba and Emma Eames. Other orchestras which toured to take part in the IMF included the Cincinnati Symphony Orchestra and the Boston Symphony Orchestra. The final IMF in 1898 featured performances by the Belgian violinist Eugène Ysaÿe. A deficit of $3,000 in 1898 convinced the city that the festivals had become too expensive to continue, and the Festival Association disbanded.
