= Luigi Vannuccini =

Italian composer and conductor

Luigi Vannuccini (4 December 1828 – 14 August 1911) was an Italian conductor, composer and teacher of bel canto

== Life ==
Born in Foiano della Chiana, Vannuccini began his musical studies with his father Ernesto, who had been singing teacher in Florence for Adelina Patti and continued at the conservatory of that Tuscan city. He was a violinist at the Teatro Leopoldo (formerly "Teatro Nazionale") and between 1848 and 1873 he conducted operas at the Teatro della Pergola.

In Florence, moreover, he founded a singing school that soon acquired great fame, not only in Italy, but also abroad, particularly in America. He was a close friend of Rossini. He was part of the historical "Quartetto Fiorentino" with Giuseppe Buonamici, Bruni and Jefte Sbolci. He was much loved as a teacher and orator. In England, a collection of "Solfeggi" from the best Italian vocal tradition was published.

He composed sacred music, works for piano and chamber music.

Vannuccini died in Bagni di Lucca at the age of 82.

His pupils included tenor William Lavin; baritones David Bispham and Harry Plunket Greene; and soprano Mary Howe.

== Work ==
- Sedici piccoli studi per canto : su parole del Metastasio.
- 2 Morceaux pour violon et violoncelle avec acc.t de piano par Luigi Vannuccini. N° 1 Berceuse.
- 40 lezioni : Op. 17. Per basso o baritono con accompagnamento di pianoforte = 40 leçons =40 lessons =40 Lektionen.
- Twenty-five singing lessons for two ladies' voices : consisting of 15 easy and progressive lessons followed by 10 short duets with pianoforte accompaniment.

== Literature ==
- Estévez, María Antonia; Costarelli, G.; Pérez Adrián, Enrique. Gran Enciclopedia de la Música Clásica. Vol. 4. SARPE. p. 1502. ISBN 9788472912267.
