= Albert Jordan =

American architect (c.1821–1872)

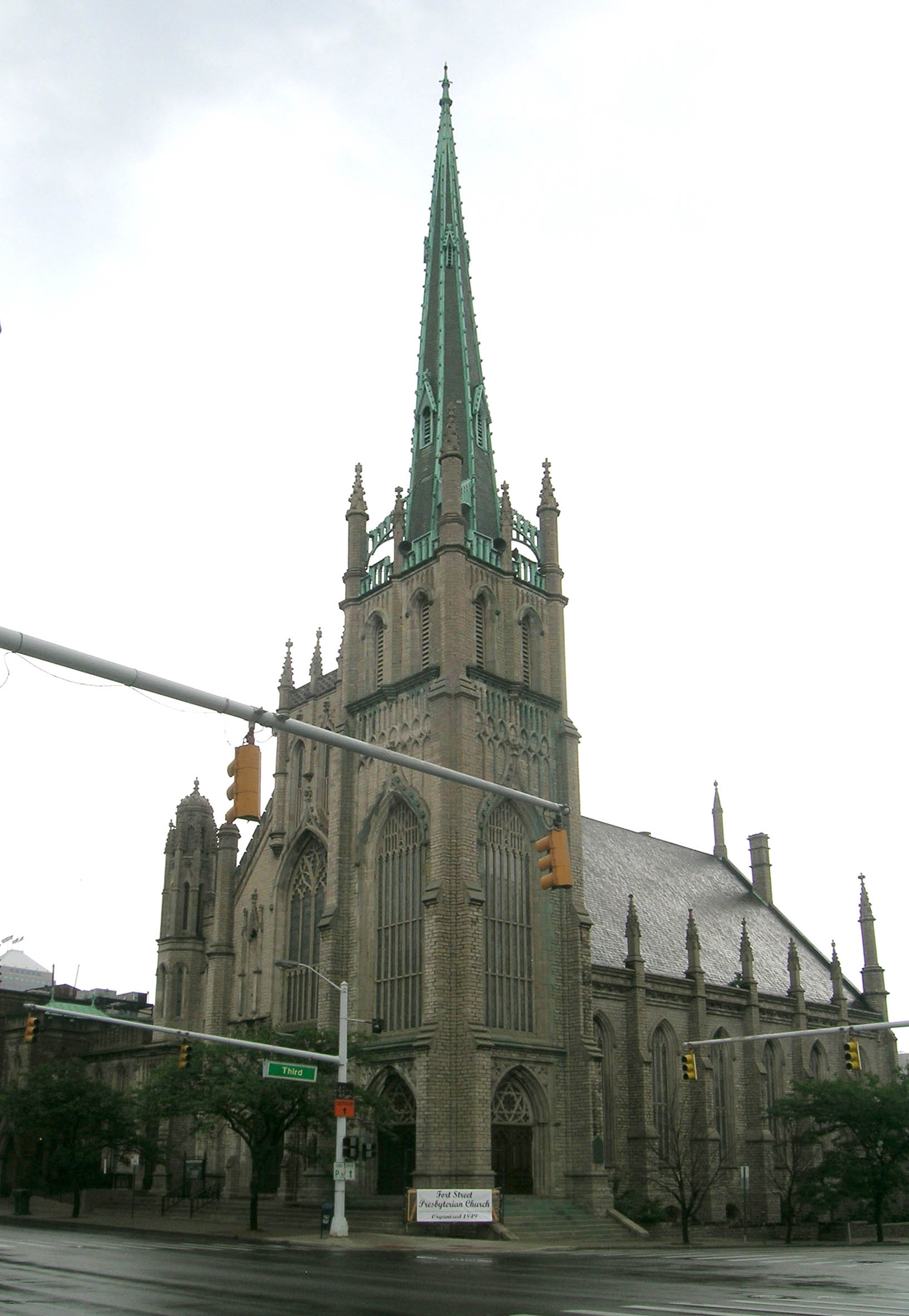
Fort Street Church, Detroit, 1853.

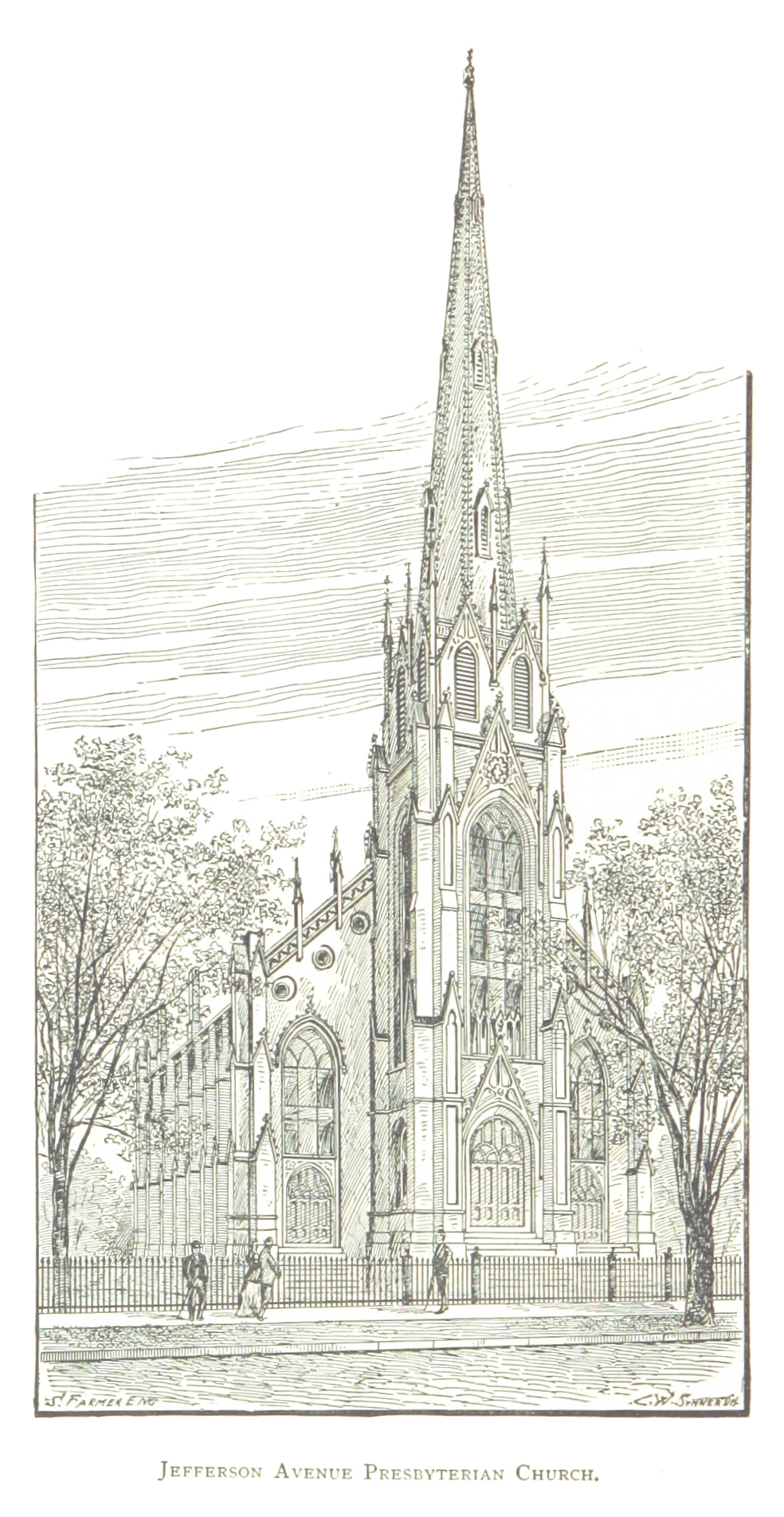
Jefferson Avenue Church, Detroit, 1854.

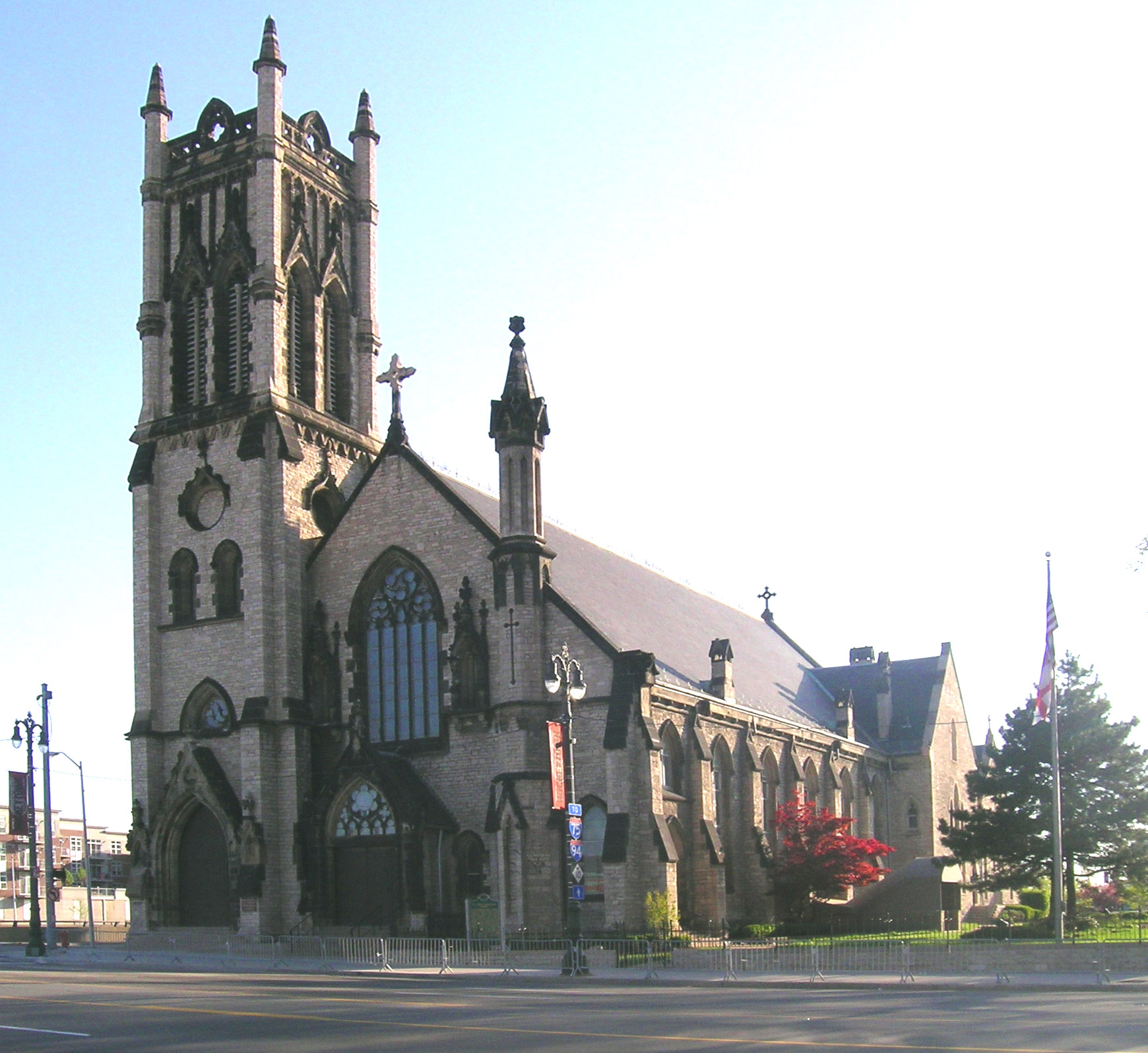
St. John's Church, Detroit, 1860.

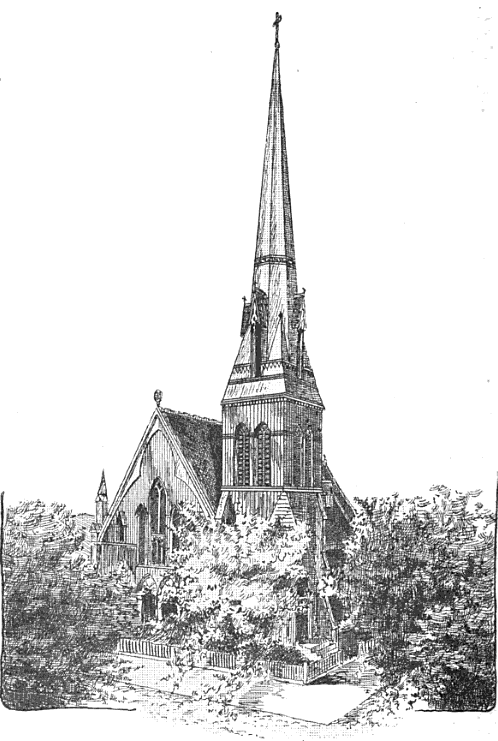
Trinity Church, Portland, 1871.

Albert Jordan, or Albert H. Jordan (c. 1821 – 1872), was an American architect known primarily for his work in Detroit, Michigan.

Jordan was born in England around 1821. In 1852 he followed his brother, Octavius Jordan, also an architect, to the United States. Joining his brother in Hartford, he became a partner in his firm, O. & A. Jordan. That same year he traveled to Detroit to open a western office, with Octavius remaining in Hartford. The brothers' partnership was dissolved in 1854, with Albert Jordan remaining in Detroit.

Jordan remained in independent practice until 1856. That year he made James Anderson, one of his draftsmen, a partner. The firm of Jordan & Anderson lasted until 1861, when Jordan departed for San Francisco. He was pushed there under the economic pressure of the Civil War, which limited architectural opportunities in Detroit. Jordan remained in San Francisco for a decade, when he left again, this time for Portland. He continued to practice architecture, and died in that city in 1872.

The firm of Jordan & Anderson was selected in 1861 as the architects of the new Detroit City Hall. Plans were drawn, but construction did not move ahead. When this now-demolished building went forward in 1867, James Anderson was the sole architect.

== Architectural works ==
O. & A. Jordan, 1852-1854:

- 1853 - Fort Street Presbyterian Church, 631 W Fort St, Detroit, Michigan
- 1854 - Jefferson Avenue Presbyterian Church, 1301 E Jefferson Ave, Detroit, Michigan
  - Demolished

Albert Jordan, 1854-1856:

- 1854 - First Congregational Church, Fort & Wayne Sts, Detroit, Michigan
  - Demolished
- 1855 - All Saints' Anglican Church, 330 City Hall Sq. W., Windsor, Ontario
- 1855 - Essex County Courthouse (Mackenzie Hall), 3277 Sandwich St W, Windsor, Ontario
- 1855 - First Presbyterian Church, Farmer & State Sts, Detroit, Michigan
  - Demolished
- 1856 - Central Public School, 350 City Hall Sq W, Windsor, Ontario
  - Later City Hall, demolished
- 1856 - Chapel, Elmwood Cemetery, Detroit, Michigan

Jordan & Anderson, 1856-1861:

- 1856 - Chemical Laboratory, University of Michigan, Ann Arbor, Michigan
  - Demolished
- 1856 - St. Luke's Episcopal Church, 120 N Huron St, Ypsilanti, Michigan
- 1857 - Russell House, 660 Woodward Ave, Detroit, Michigan
  - Once Detroit's most expensive hotel. Demolished.
- 1857 - Union School, 210 W Cross St, Ypsilanti, Michigan
  - Demolished
- 1858 - Henry P. Baldwin House, 341 Woodward Ave, Detroit, Michigan
  - Demolished
- 1858 - Zachariah Chandler House, W Fort & 2nd Sts, Detroit, Michigan
  - Demolished
- 1860 - St. John's Episcopal Church, 2326 Woodward Ave, Detroit, Michigan
- 1860 - St. Patrick's R. C. Church, 124 Adelaide St, Detroit, Michigan
  - Burned in 1993
- 1861 - Law Building (Haven Hall), University of Michigan, Ann Arbor, Michigan
  - Demolished

Albert H. Jordan, 1861-1872:

- 1863 - Second M. E. Church, 657 Howard St, San Francisco, California
  - Also known as the Howard Street Church, demolished
- 1865 - St. Matthew's Episcopal Church, 1 S El Camino Real, San Mateo, California
  - Destroyed in 1906
- 1866 - Trinity Episcopal Church, 384 Post St, San Francisco, California
  - Demolished
- 1871 - Trinity Episcopal Church, SW 6th & Oak Sts, Portland, Oregon
  - Burned in 1902
