= William Shakespeare (tenor) =

English tenor, teacher and composer (1849–1931)

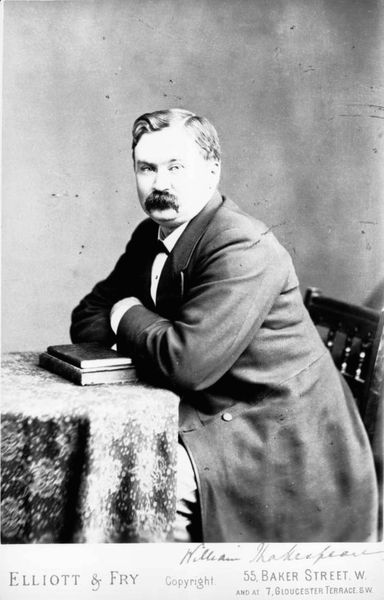
John William Thomas Shakespeare (1849-1931)

John William Thomas Shakespeare (16 June 1849 – 1 November 1931) was an English tenor, teacher and composer.

== Life ==
Shakespeare was born in Croydon, England, on 16 June 1849. In 1866 he won a King's Scholarship to study at the Royal Academy of Music, London, with William Sterndale Bennett. Awarded the Mendelssohn Scholarship in 1871, he traveled to Leipzig to study with composer, pianist, conductor, and pedagogue Carl Reinecke, but soon left Leipzig for Milan to study under the guidance of the singing teacher Francesco Lamperti. He appeared in England once again as a tenor in 1875, where he sang at the Monday Popular Concerts at the Crystal Palace and the 1877 Leeds Festival. He was appointed as a Professor of Singing at the Royal Academy of Music in 1878 and Conductor of the Concerts in 1880, resigning the latter post in 1886. From 1902 to 1905 Shakespeare was the conductor of the Strolling Players' Amateur Orchestral Society (which had been founded in 1882). He died in London in 1931.

Shakespeare composed few works, but his Piano Concerto was heard at the 1879 Brighton Festival, where The Musical Times outlined his singing career and judged that

if the revision and production of his Concerto signify a return to creative art, all who know his ability will be glad. We have not so many promising young composers amongst us that we can afford to spare even one. Looking back upon the entire Concerto, I must characterise it as remarkable for grace and refinement, but as somewhat wanting in the strength given by symphonic employment of the orchestra and highly contrasted subjects. It serves, however, to revive interest in Mr. Shakespeare as a composer, and to determine towards him in the musical world an expectant attitude.

In addition to singing, teaching, and composing, Shakespeare wrote and published several books. These included The Art of Singing, a three-part series issued between 1898 and 1899; Singing for Schools and Colleges, published in 1907; Plain Words on Singing in 1924; and The Speaker's Art in 1931. Shakespeare's approach to vocal pedagogy closely followed that of his Italian mentor Lamperti, as reflected in his direct reference to la lotte vocale, a concept drawn from the nineteenth-century Italianate school of vocal training.

His pupils included tenor William Lavin and soprano Genevra Johnstone-Bishop.

== Works ==
=== Orchestral ===
- 1871 – Symphony in C minor (Gewandhaus, Leipzig)
- 1872 – Overture in D (Crystal Palace, London, 25 January 1873)
- 1874 – Hamlet, dramatic overture (Crystal Palace, London)

=== Solo instrumentalist and orchestra ===
- 1879 – Piano Concerto in C (Brighton Festival, 12 February 1879)
