= William Lavin =

American singer

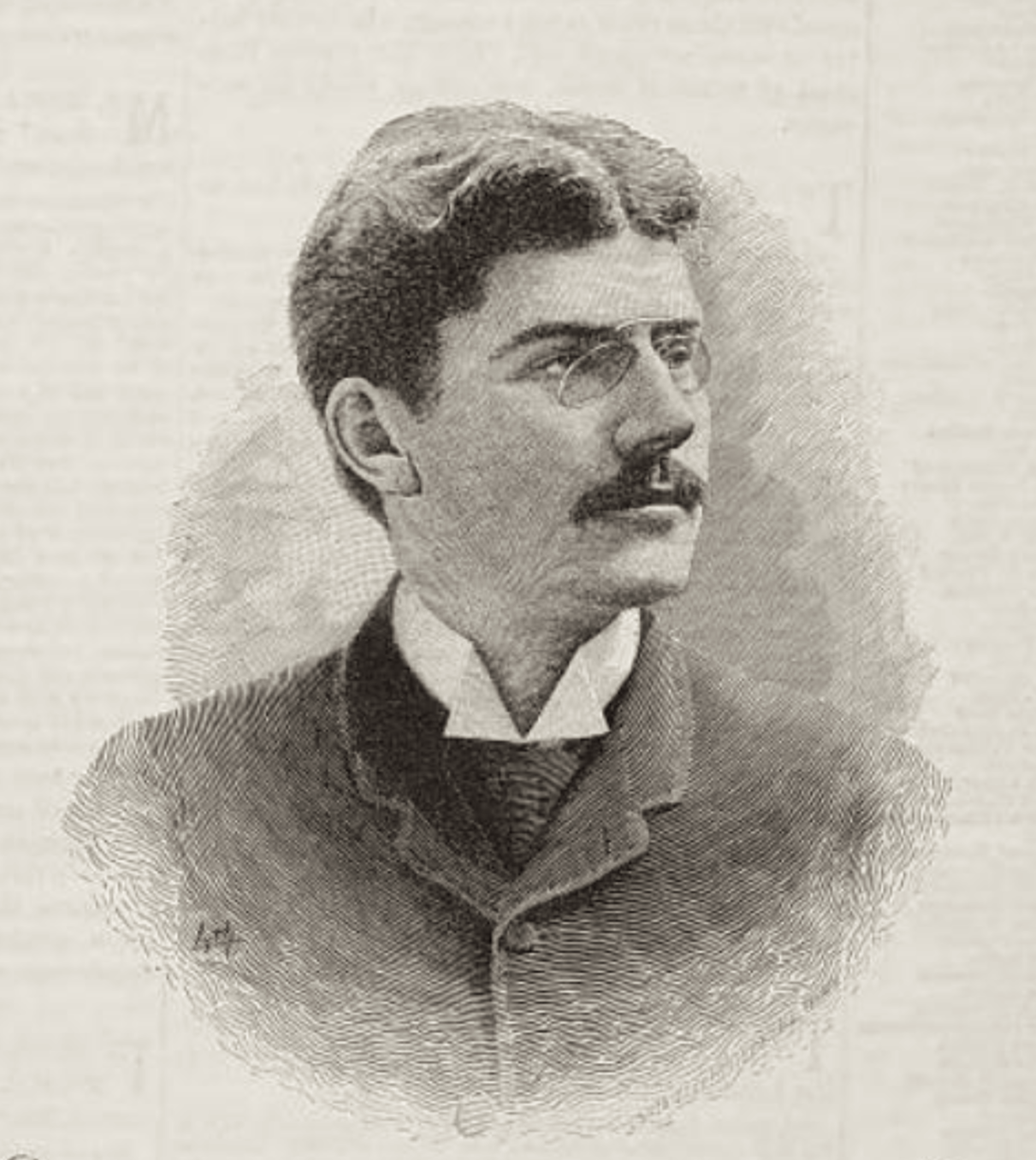

Background information
- Born: William J. Lavin; June 30, 1864; Green Island, New York, U.S.
- Died: November 3, 1933 (aged 69) Highland Park, Michigan, U.S.
- Occupations: Tenor; Voice teacher
- Spouse(s): Mary Howe (m. 1891–1902) Katherine "Cora" R. Campbell (m. 1902–1933)

William J. Lavin (30 June 1864 – 3 November 1933) was an American tenor and voice teacher. Born in Green Island, New York, Lavin moved with his family to Detroit, Michigan where he studied voice with J. D. Mehan. He subsequently trained as singer in Europe with several well known teachers, including William Shakespeare in London and Luigi Vannuccini in Italy. He also studied at the Conservatoire de Paris. He had an active career as a singer from 1888 until his retirement from performance more than 35 years later. As an oratorio singer, he performed with many prominent orchestras, including the Berlin Philharmonic, the Toronto Symphony Orchestra, the New York Philharmonic, the Boston Symphony Orchestra, and the Chicago Symphony Orchestra.

Lavin was married to the soprano Mary Howe from 1891 until their divorce in 1902. Both before and during their marriage the couple frequently performed together; including on the opera stage. Although he was predominantly a concert tenor, Lavin was active as an opera singer in Europe in the mid 1890s; including performing as a principal tenor with the Berlin State Opera and La Monnaie. In the United States he was a leading tenor with the Castle Square Opera Company (1898) and The Bostonians (1898–1899). He also toured in concerts of opera music with Lillian Nordica (1896–1897), Marcella Sembrich (1897), and Adelina Patti (1901). The latter tour was in the United Kingdom where he was predominantly based from 1901 through 1903.

In 1904 Lavin resettled in Detroit; joining the voice faculty of the Michigan Conservatory of Music in that city. While he continued to perform on the concert stage, his engagements were less frequent as he devoted more time to teaching. He was also a longtime church vocalist at the Fort Street Presbyterian Church in Detroit. He died in 1933 after having retired from singing approximately nine years earlier.

== Early life and education (1864–1888) ==
The son of John Lavin and Anna Lavin (née Murphy), William J. Lavin was born on 30 June 1864 in Green Island, New York. In c. 1880 he moved with his parents and his brothers, George and Edward, to Detroit, Michigan. He studied singing in Detroit with J. D. Mehan. This was followed by studies with other American teachers.

In December 1884 Lavin appeared as tenor soloist with the Schumann Society at the Detroit Opera House. He went to Europe where he studied with Alberto Randegger and tenor William Shakespeare in London and Luigi Vannuccini in Italy. In August 1888 he performed in concerts of Irish ballads organized by William Ludwig at the Olympia London. This marked his London concert debut in which he sang the songs "Kathleen Mavourneen" and "Then you'll remember me".

== Career ==
=== Early work as a concert tenor in the United States (1888–1892) ===
In September 1888 Lavin returned to the United States from the United Kingdom via the SS City of New York. Soon after he began performing as a member of Emma Juch's touring concert company; making his debut with the company on 5 October 1888 at the People's Theater in Minneapolis performing the title role in a concert version of Act II of Faust with musical forces led by Victor Herbert. In the 1888–1889 season Lavin toured with Juch's company for performances in theaters in Nebraska, Missouri, Iowa, Kansas, Pennsylvania, Connecticut, New Jersey, New York, Virginia, Georgia, Tennessee, North Carolina, Massachusetts, and Maine.

In May 1889 Lavin was the tenor soloist in Felix Mendelssohn's Elijah with the Apollo Chorus of Chicago at Central Music Hall. For the 1889–1890 season he toured the United States as a member of Jules Levy's concert company. In May and June 1890 Lavin went on tour with Patrick Gilmore and his band.

By the early 1890s, Lavin was teaching singing out of a private studio in New York City. In December 1890 he sang the role of Prince Henry in the first New York performance of Arthur Sullivan's cantata The Golden Legend with the New York Chorus Society. That same month he was the tenor soloist in Ferdinand Hiller's cantata Song of Victory at Carnegie Hall; Handel's Messiah with the New York Philharmonic (NYP) and the Oratorio Society of New York led by Walter Damrosch at the Metropolitan Opera House; and as a guest soloist in concert with the Brooklyn Choral Society at the Brooklyn Academy of Music.

In February 1891 Lavin performed in concert with the Choral Society of Washington at Lincoln Hall in Washington D.C. with his fellow soloist being soprano Mary Howe. He and Howe were soloist again soon after with members of the NYP as their orchestra at the Meriden Opera House in April 1891. He married Mary Howe later that year on November 30, 1891 in Cleveland. In April 1891 he performed with conductor Theodore Thomas and his Thomas Orchestra at Historical Hall in Brooklyn, and performed with Thomas again at the 1891 Indianapolis May Festival. He was also the tenor soloist in Haydn's The Creation with the Baltimore Symphony Orchestra at the 1891 May Festival in Charlotte, North Carolina. He was the tenor soloist in several different performances of the Messiah in December 1891; among them performances at the Academy of Music in Philadelphia; the Auditorium Theatre in Chicago with the Chicago Symphony Orchestra and the Apollo Chorus; and at The Swedish Tabernacle in Minneapolis.

In January 1892 Lavin and his wife were soloists in the Messiah for performances with the New York Symphony Orchestra and Choral Society of Washington at Albaugh's Grand Opera House. The couple frequently performed recitals and concerts together in 1892 in such states as Maine, Connecticut, Massachusetts, Vermont, and New York. In August 1892 they were soloists in a special concert organized by the Estey Organ company celebrating 250,000th organ manufactured by the company which was presided over by Carroll S. Page, then the 43rd governor of Vermont.

=== International career (1892–1896) ===
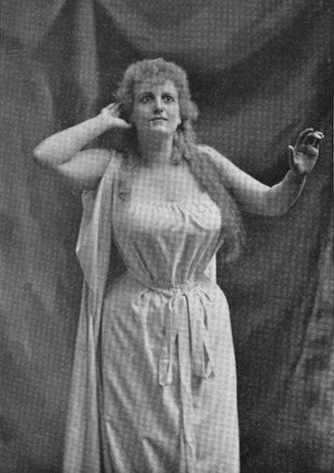
1896 photograph of Mary Howe-Lavin performing in an opera

In September 1892 Lavin and his wife left the United States for Florence, Italy where both singers intended to train for careers in opera under Lavin's old teacher, Luigi Vannuccini, in Florence for a period of two years. They returned to the United States for a brief visit in the summer of 1893 during which time they performed in concert with the Beethoven Quartet of New York and at the Western New Hampshire Music Festival with the Boston Symphony Orchestra.

Lavin and his wife performed in several concerts together in Berlin in early 1894; including a concert with the Berlin Philharmonic on 20 January 1894. The German concert agent Herman Wolff managed their appearances in Berlin and other German cities including performances with the Philharmonisches Staatsorchester Hamburg. They began a concert tour of the United States with their own company, the Howe-Lavin Concert Company, on 3 March 1893 at Metzerot Music Hall in Washington D.C. The company also consisted of baritone Giuseppe Campanari and the violinist Leonora von Stosch with the pianist Isidore Luckstone as music director. The tour included performances in theaters in Illinois, Missouri, Indiana, Michigan, Ohio, Vermont, Connecticut, Rhode Island, Maine, and New York.

The Lavins returned to Europe in September 1894. They went to Paris where William attended the Conservatoire de Paris for further training as a singer. He made his professional opera debut at the opera house in Szczecin on 27 December 1895 as Edgardo di Ravenswood in Lucia di Lammermoor with his wife in the title role. This was followed by a performances in the title role Charles Gounod's Faust, the Duke of Mantua in Rigoletto, and Alfredo in La traviata; all opposite his wife in the leading soprano parts. In February 1896 he was the tenor soloist in performances of Hector Berlioz's Requiem with the Berlin Philharmonic, and soon after he appeared in operas opposite his wife in Würzburg and Vienna. On April 21, 1896 he performed the part of Edgardo di Ravenswood opposite his wife as Lucia for his debut at the Berlin State Opera (BSO). He subsequently performed the parts of Raoul de Nangis in Les Huguenots, Radamès in Aida, and Romeo in Roméo et Juliette at the BSO. He then parted company with his wife, who went to England to perform with the Carl Rosa Opera Company, while he went to Brussels to sing in operas at La Monnaie.

=== Concert and opera tenor on the American stage (1896–1900) ===
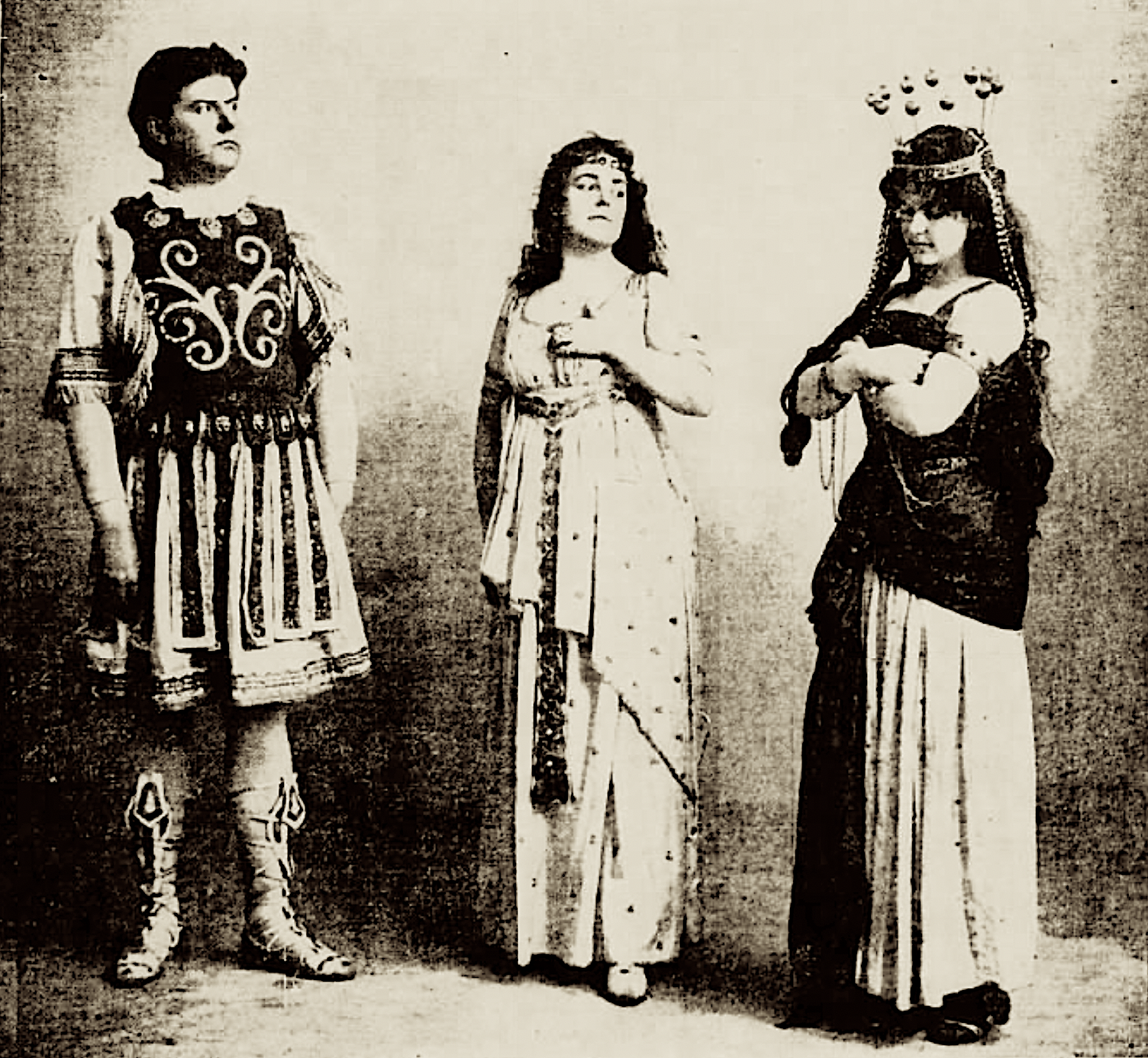
William Lavin (left) as Radamès in Aida with Grace Romaine (center) as Amneris and Yvonne de Treville as Aida in the Castle Square Opera production in 1898

Lavin returned to the United States for the 1896–1897 season where he performed in concerts and oratorios across North America under the management of the Hirschberg musical bureau. This included performances as the tenor soloist in Gioachino Rossini's Stabat Mater with both the Toronto Symphony Orchestra (1896) and the Metropolitan Opera (1897, "the Met"). In December 1896 he performed a benefit concert at the Waldorf Astoria New York with opera singer Camille Seygard and the orchestra of the Met led by Anton Seidl. He also performed a series of concerts on tour with Lillian Nordica in 1896–1897; performed the part of the archangel Uriel in Haydn's The Creation with the Kansas City Philharmonic (1897), and was a soloist in Messiah in Brantford, Ontario.

In September 1897 Lavin performed performed as the tenor soloist in Charles Gounod's La rédemption at the Worcester Music Festival. In the last months of 1897 he toured the United States in concert with Marcella Sembrich with an orchestra led by Enrico Bevignani. The tour began at the Metropolitan Opera House in New York in October. Other stops on the tour included Carnegie Hall in New York, the Academy of Music in Philadelphia, the Auditorium Music Hall in Baltimore, Boston Music Hall, and Buffalo Music Hall. In addition to concerts, the tour included performances of The Barber of Seville with Sembrich as Rosina, Lavin as Almaviva, Giuseppe Del Puente as Figaro, and Agostino Carbone as Don Bartolo.

In 1898 Lavin toured the United States with the Boston Festival Orchestra led by conductor Emil Mollenhauer in performances of The Barber of Seville. In October 1898 He made his debut with the Castle Square Opera Company at the American Theatre in New York City as Radamès in Aida with Yvonne de Tréville in the title role. Other roles he performed with Castle Square that season included Romeo in Gounod' Roméo et Juliette.

In December 1898 Lavin replaced W. E. Philip as leading tenor of the touring opera company The Bostonians. He gave his first performance with the company at Powers Theatre in Chicago as Lopez in Victor Herbert's The Serenade. His other repertoire with this group in the 1898–1899 national tour included Agamemnon in W. H. Neidlinger's Ulysses, Prince Charles Edward Stuart in Reginald De Koven's Rob Roy, and the title role in De Koven's Robin Hood.

In the Autumn of 1899 Lavin gave a concert tour with his wife in New England and New York. The pair toured in performances given by the Mary Howe-Lavin Operatic Concert Company in 1900.

=== Return to Europe, divorce, and second marriage (1900–1903) ===
In November 1900 Lavin left the United States for Europe in order to fulfill singing engagements in Germany. He performed as a soloist with John Philip Sousa's band on its 1901 tour of England; including a performance for King Edward VII. He gave a concert tour of the United Kingdom with Adelina Patti in 1901. In December 1901 he performed in concert with soprano Amy Eliza Castles at St James's Hall. Around this time he received a petition for divorce from his wife, Mary Howe, at the Carlton Hotel, London where he was staying. Their divorce was finalized in March 1902.

In February 1902 Lavin gave a concert at Colston Hall with organist George Riseley, in April 1902 he performed in a concert at Clumber House for Francis Pelham-Clinton-Hope, 8th Duke of Newcastle. By July 1902 he was back in the United States performing with Sousa's band and soprano Selma Kronold at Steeplechase Pier in Atlantic City. In September 1902 he was a soloist with the Buffalo Philharmonic Orchestra led by John Lund. This was followed by performances at the Masonic Temple Theatre in Detroit. In October 1902 he married his second wife, Katherine "Cora" R. Campbell. He returned to England after this and performed at the festival of the York Musical Society in December 1902. He performed in concerts with the Royal Liverpool Philharmonic and the Glasgow Choral Union.

In 1903 Lavin starred in productions of Aida and Faust at the Strasbourg Opera House, and performed in several concerts under conductor Henry Wood at Queen's Hall in London. After this he gave a 1903 concert tour of Germany and Austria. In December 1903 he was in New York City performing at the West End Theatre with the New York Symphony Orchestra and conductor Walter Damrosch. In January 1904 he was tenor soloist in The Creation with the Yonkers Choral Society, and the following April he performed in a concert of Irish music at Carnegie Hall.

=== Teacher in Detroit and later performance career (1904–1924) ===
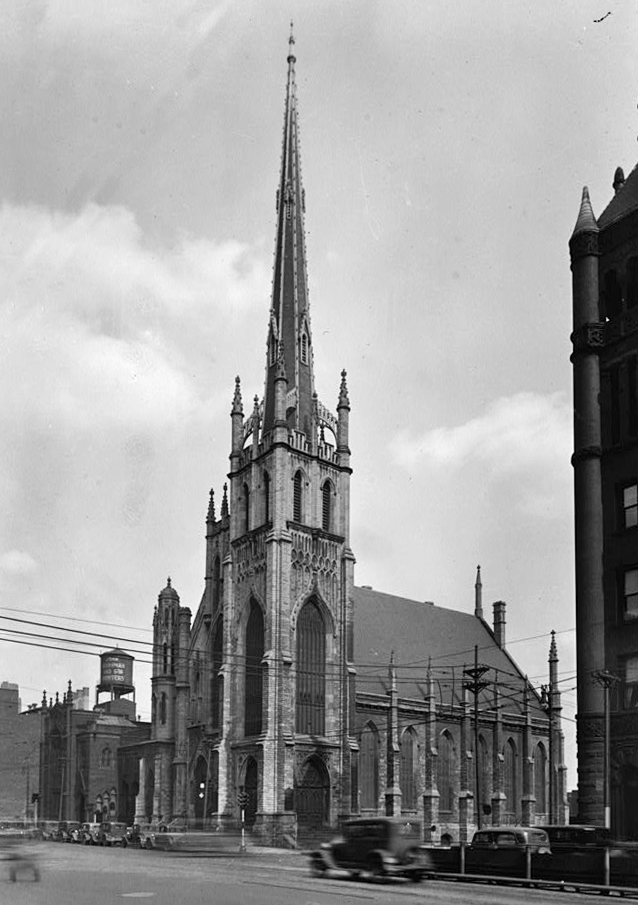
Fort Street Presbyterian Church where Lavin was a church singer for many years

By 1904 Lavin had settled in Detroit where he was teaching out of a private voice studio in the Gladwin Building. In the autumn of 1904 he joined the voice faculty of the Michigan Conservatory of Music. While working on that staff he was concurrently the longtime tenor soloist in residence at the Fort Street Presbyterian Church in Detroit. He gave multiple recitals in Detroit and the surrounding region, and was frequently employed in Michigan as an oratorio singer. He was still giving public recitals as late as 1924.

Lavin continued to perform periodically outside of Michigan while working principally as a teacher. In April 1905 he sang in concerts conducted by Victor Herbert at the Majestic Theatre in Manhattan. In November 1906 he was the tenor soloist in Verdi's Messa da Requiem with the Pittsburgh Symphony Orchestra. In January 1908 he was the tenor soloist in Alfred Gaul's Joan of Arc with the Oratorio Society of Toronto and the orchestra of the Toronto Conservatory of Music at Massey Hall. In April 1909 he sang a concert of tenor arias with the Buffalo Orchestral Association led by Walter S. Goodale at Buffalo's Convention Hall. In April 1910 he gave a recital at Curry Hall in Windsor, Ontario.

In 1906 Lavin was the tenor soloist in The Creation in performances with the Chicago Symphony Orchestra given at Eastern Michigan University. In April 1908 he sang in concerts dedicating the grand opening of the Grinnell Building at 1515 Woodward Ave in Detroit. In June 1908 he was the tenor soloist in Rossini's Stabat Mater performed for the commencement of the University of Olivet. He recorded the "Cujus animam" from this work for Columbia Records in December 1908. In January 1909 he was the tenor soloist in the Detroit premiere of Liza Lehmann's The Golden Threshold with Detroit Fine Arts Society, and following May he performed in concert with the Detroit String Quartet at Temple Beth El.

On March 10, 1910 Lavin performed the part of Azaël in the United States premiere of L'enfant prodigue in with the Detroit Fine Arts Society. On August 1, 1911 Lavin and his second wife finalized a divorce. On Christmas Day 2011 he was a soloist in Handel's Messiah with conductor Albert David Jordan in London, Ontario. In 1920 he performed in concert with the Buffalo Symphony Orchestra at Shea's Hippodrome Theatre.

== Retirement and death ==
Lavin retired from performance in the 1920s with one of his late recital appearances being in Chatham, Ontario in 1924. In 1920 his mother died in Detroit. His brother George, a prominent psychiatrist in Detroit, died the following year. His father had died previously in 1912, and his brother Edward died in 1918. When his brother George died in 1921 he was the last surviving member of his family.

William J. Lavin died on 3 November 1933. The Detroit Free Press reported in its obituary that Lavin died at 28 Richton St in Highland Park, Michigan in the home where he had resided for the past 12 years. However, his death record in the Michigan, U.S., Death Records, 1867–1952 states that he died at Eloise, the psychiatric hospital in Westland, Michigan.
