= Mackenzie Hall =

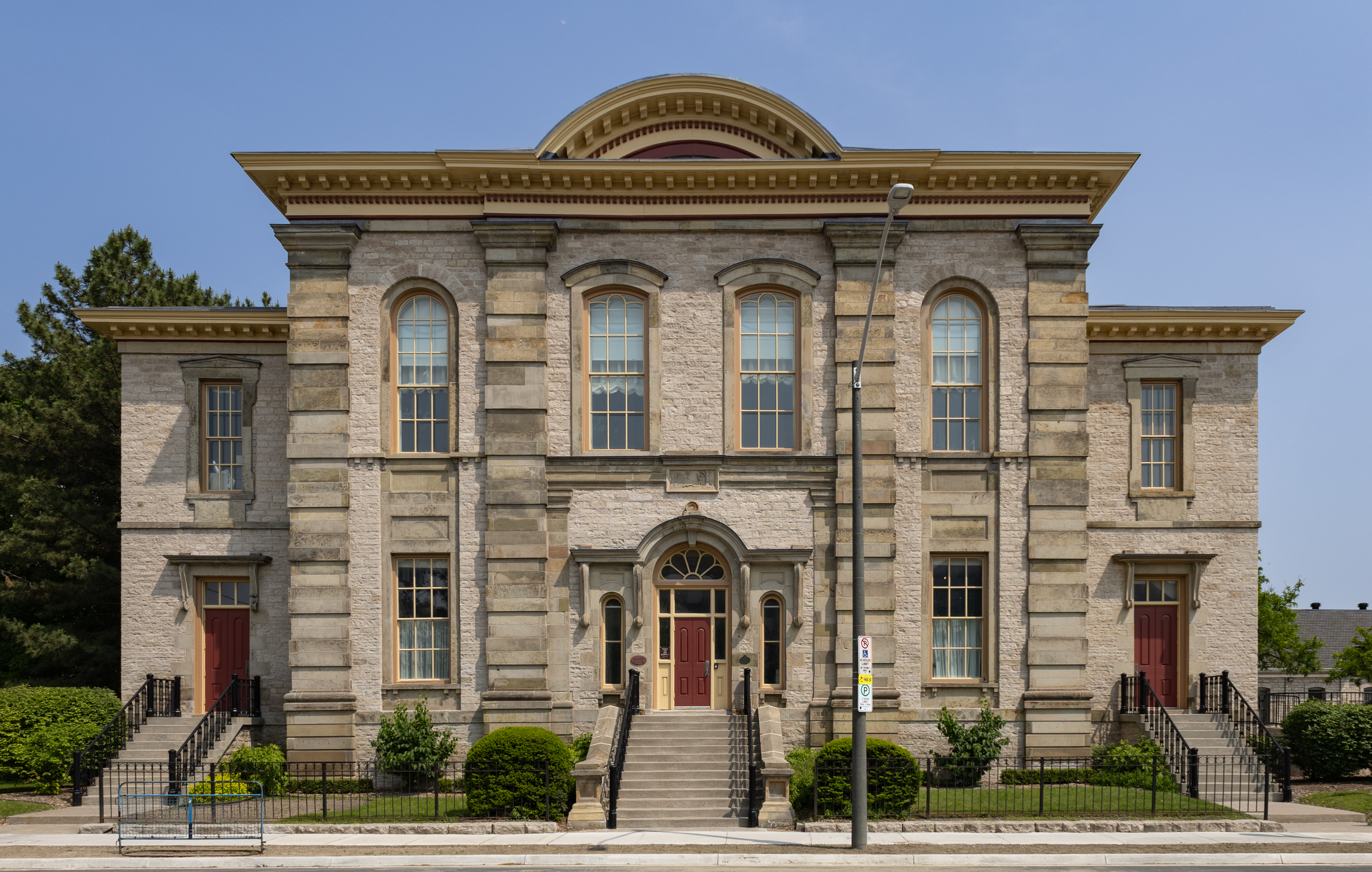
- Interactive map of the Mackenzie Hall area

General information
- Location: 3277 Sandwich Street, Windsor, Ontario, Canada
- Coordinates: 42.3002°N 83.0763°W
- Year built: 1854–1855
- Owner: City of Windsor

Design and construction
- Architect: Albert Jordan

Mackenzie Hall, previously the Essex County Courthouse, is a cultural centre and former courthouse in the Sandwich neighbourhood of Windsor, Ontario, Canada. Built by Alexander Mackenzie from a design by Albert Jordan between 1854 and 1855, it was used as a courthouse until 1963 and a meeting place for the Essex County Council until 1975. Acquired by the City of Windsor in 1982, it was converted into a cultural centre. The two-storey limestone building has been expanded and renovated several times.

== Location and description ==
Mackenzie Hall is located at 3277 Sandwich Street in the Sandwich neighbourhood of Windsor, Ontario, near the corner of Brock and Sandwich streets. The Hall is described by Canada's Historic Places as "a visually dominating presence" that provides "the most important component of the heritage character in the neighbourhood." The area has several extant buildings from the 19th century, including the former Essex County Registry Office (1876) and St. John's Anglican Church (1819–1871).

Mackenzie Hall is a two-storey building in rough-hewn limestone with sandstone trimming. It is built in the classic revival style with Italianate influences, using what Canada's Historic Places describes as "stately lines and at an impressive scale and massing". The symmetrical front façade is marked by four pilasters as well as a Palladian entrance and heavy cornice. The first storey is elevated and accessed through a staircase, which is flanked by stones bearing the signatures of the architect and the builder.

Inside Mackenzie Hall are numerous late-19th century furnishings. These include a golden oak bench, witness box, barristers' table, and clerk's desk that date to an 1892 remodelling. Other artefacts in the building include the original cornerstone and an 1860 silent wall clock. The grounds include a commemorative plaque providing a brief history of the building.

== History ==
=== Courthouse ===
Mackenzie Hall was built in the 1850s as a replacement for a dilapidated brick courthouse that had been built three decades prior; the new building would serve Essex County, which had been established in 1850 through the division of the Western District of Upper Canada. The Detroit-based architect Albert Jordan was retained for the project in 1853, with the Sarnia-based Mackenzie Builders winning the contract two years later. The firm, led by future Canadian prime minister Alexander Mackenzie, laid the cornerstone on 24 May 1854. Construction was completed in 1855, at which time Cochrane Sculptors carved the Essex County seal above the courthouse's main entrance.

The new Essex County Courthouse featured town council chambers on the second storey, which were used by the Sandwich council after the town's incorporation in 1858. Jail cells were initially located on the first floor, under the council chambers, but relocated to a cell block designed by Gordon W. Lloyd in 1870 after the previous courthouse was demolished. Executions were conducted at the site from 1862, when the escaped slave George Williams was hanged for the murder of his wife. Hangings continued through 1943, when two Americans who had murdered a Windsor proprietor became the last people executed at the courthouse. Among the lawyers who practised at the courthouse was Delos Davis, who became the first Black Canadian King's Counsel in 1910.

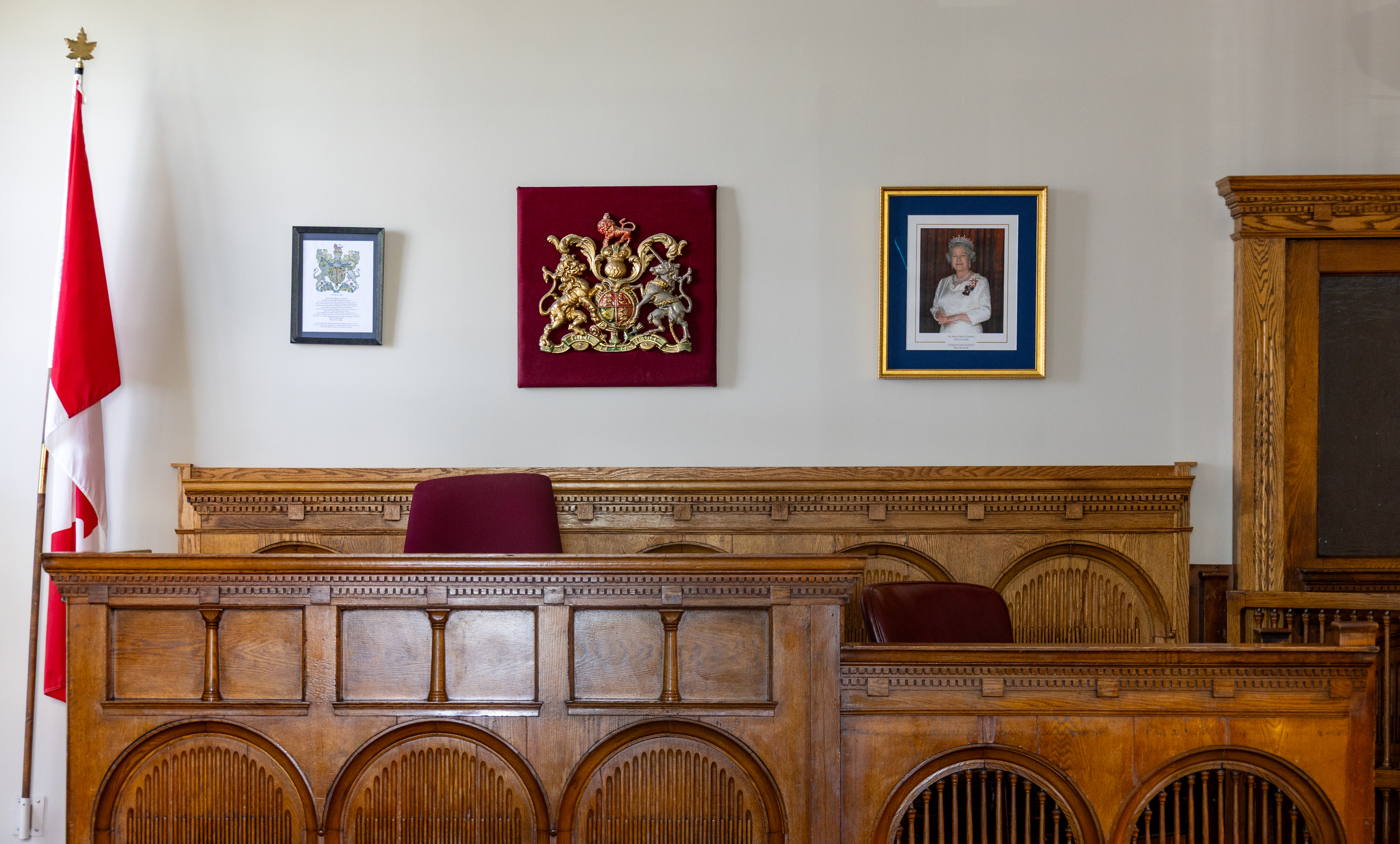
The bench and clerk desk, installed 1892

A new registrar's office designed by Lloyd was built by Hypolite Rheaume between 1876 and 1877 where the former courthouse had stood. Renovations completed before 1891 replaced the courthouse's metal roof with one of slate, and in 1892 the Detroit firm Mason and Rice remodelled the courthouse's interior. Work continued through the 20th century. In 1924, after a fire devastated the 1870-built cell block, the architectural firm Nichols, Sheppard & Masson designed a new jail as well as several additions that tripled the size of the courthouse. Another addition, designed by David J. Cameron, was constructed between 1947 and 1950; this coincided with several modifications to the existing structure, including the partitioning of the council chambers. Air conditioning was installed by Sheppard, Masson, Brand & Langlois in 1961, which resulted in the ceilings being lowered.

Also in the mid-20th century, the Essex County Courthouse was repurposed. The Superior Court of Justice vacated in 1948, with the Essex County Council – which had relocated to the Sandwich Town Hall – returning to the courthouse that year. In 1963, other court activities relocated to new buildings in downtown Windsor, with Judge Bruce J.S. Macdonald presiding over the last hearings. Parts of the building, including the tunnel between the jailhouse and court, were demolished. Several new tenants, including the county assessor and the welfare document, occupied the former courthouse through the end of the decade. In 1975, the Essex County council relocated to Essex, and the building was sold to the Ministry of Government Services for $123,000. The building was sealed.

=== Designation and cultural centre ===
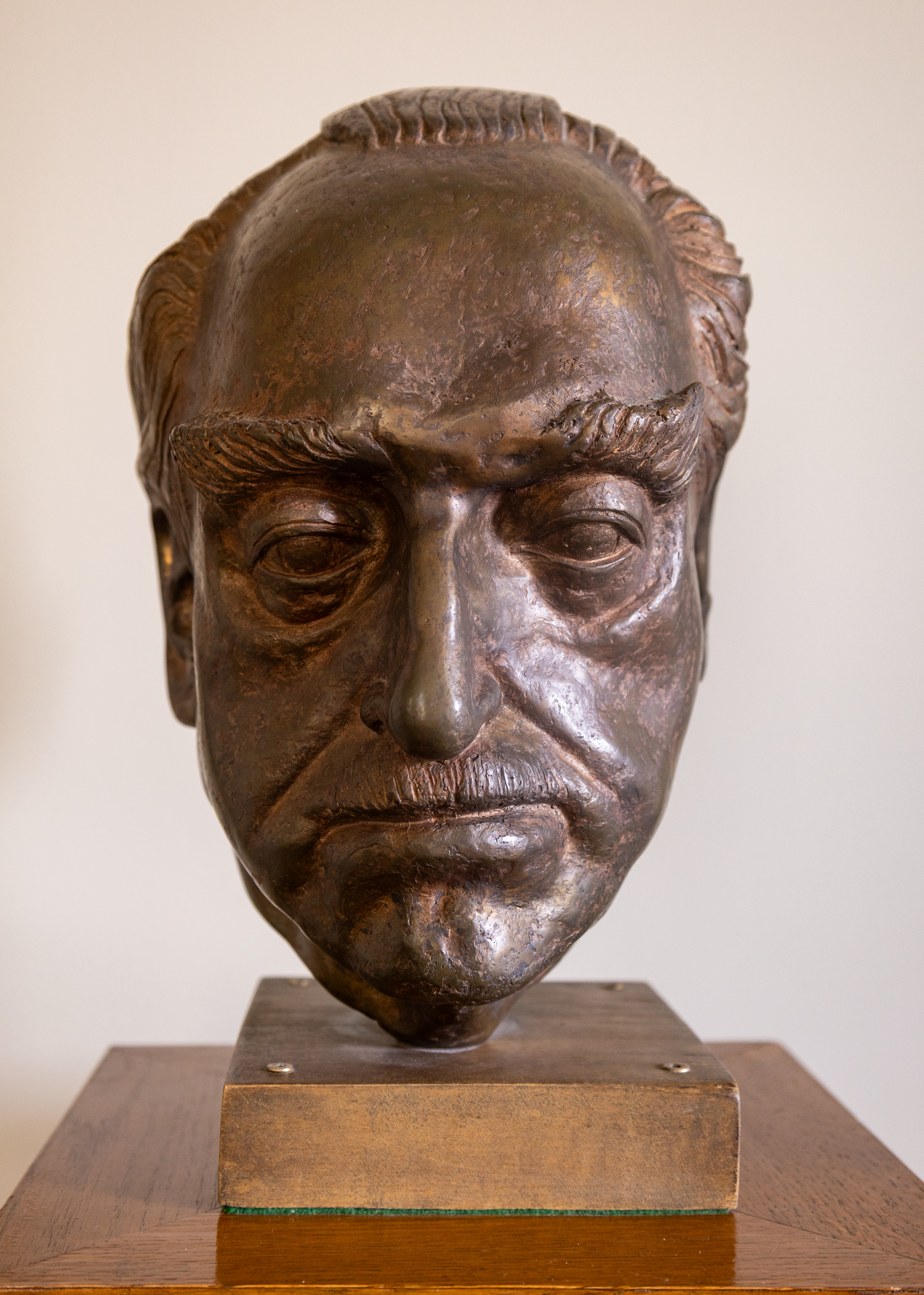
Bust of Judge Bruce J. S. Macdonald by Daniel Boles, installed 1986

After the sale of the former courthouse, an advocacy group was established to promote its recognition under the Ontario Heritage Act. Designation was granted by the City of Windsor in 1978 through By-Law 5894. The following year, the Ministry of Government Services declared the building surplus and offered to resell it for a "nominal sum". Despite criticism from Mayor Albert Weeks, who declared the building "not worth one dollar", the offer was supported by The Windsor Star as well as members of parliament Eugene Whelan, Herb Gray, and Mark MacGuigan. Ultimately, the City of Windsor purchased the building in 1982 for $200 after conducting several studies and receiving a grant from the Ontario Heritage Foundation.

To honour Alexander Mackenzie, the building was renamed Mackenzie Hall. Renovations continued for several years, with grants received from the Canada Community Development Program, the Federal Community Employment Incentive Program, and Wintario. Further funding was collected from private donors through benefit dinners, open houses, and a fundraising cruise to Bois Blanc Island. The total cost of renovations was $2.7 million, which went toward strengthening the building, building new stairs, and installing an elevator. Other expansions included a new wall to provide space for parking. Restoration was handled by the architect Carlos Ventin.

In October 1985, Mackenzie Hall was opened to the public. After Judge Macdonald died in 1986, a room – featuring a bust by the sculptor Daniel Boles – was dedicated to him. In 2021, an extensive renovation project was undertaken to restore the masonry. This included replacing the Portland cement mortar used in the 1980s renovation with lime mortar, which was considered better suited to the stone architecture and climate.

As of 2025, Mackenzie Hall is used as a cultural centre, and has hosted events such as jazz performances and art exhibitions. It includes spaces for performing arts, visual art, and theatre, as well as a ballroom and meeting spaces. The building is open to the public, with guided tours available to groups and self-guided tours possible.

== Works cited ==
- Caton, Mary (28 January 2020). "Artists of Colour Exhibit Highlights Black History Month". Windsor Star. Archived from the original on 29 January 2020.
- Colling, Herb (2003). Turning Points: The Detroit Riot of 1967, A Canadian Perspective. Dundurn. ISBN 978-1-55488-089-8.
- Cross, Brian (10 August 2021). "$757,244 Mackenzie Hall Facelift will Take Till October". Windsor Star. Archived from the original on 14 August 2021.
- "History of Mackenzie Hall". City of Windsor. Archived from the original on 25 April 2025.
- "Mackenzie Hall". City of Windsor. Archived from the original on 23 March 2025.
- "Mackenzie Hall (Former Essex County Court House)". Historic Places. Parks Canada. Archived from the original on 16 August 2022.
- Perkins, Mary Ellen (1989). Discover Your Heritage: A Guide to Provincial Plaques in Ontario. Dundurn. ISBN 978-0-920474-50-1.
