= St. John's Episcopal Church (Detroit) =

Church in Detroit, Michigan, United States

St John's Episcopal Church
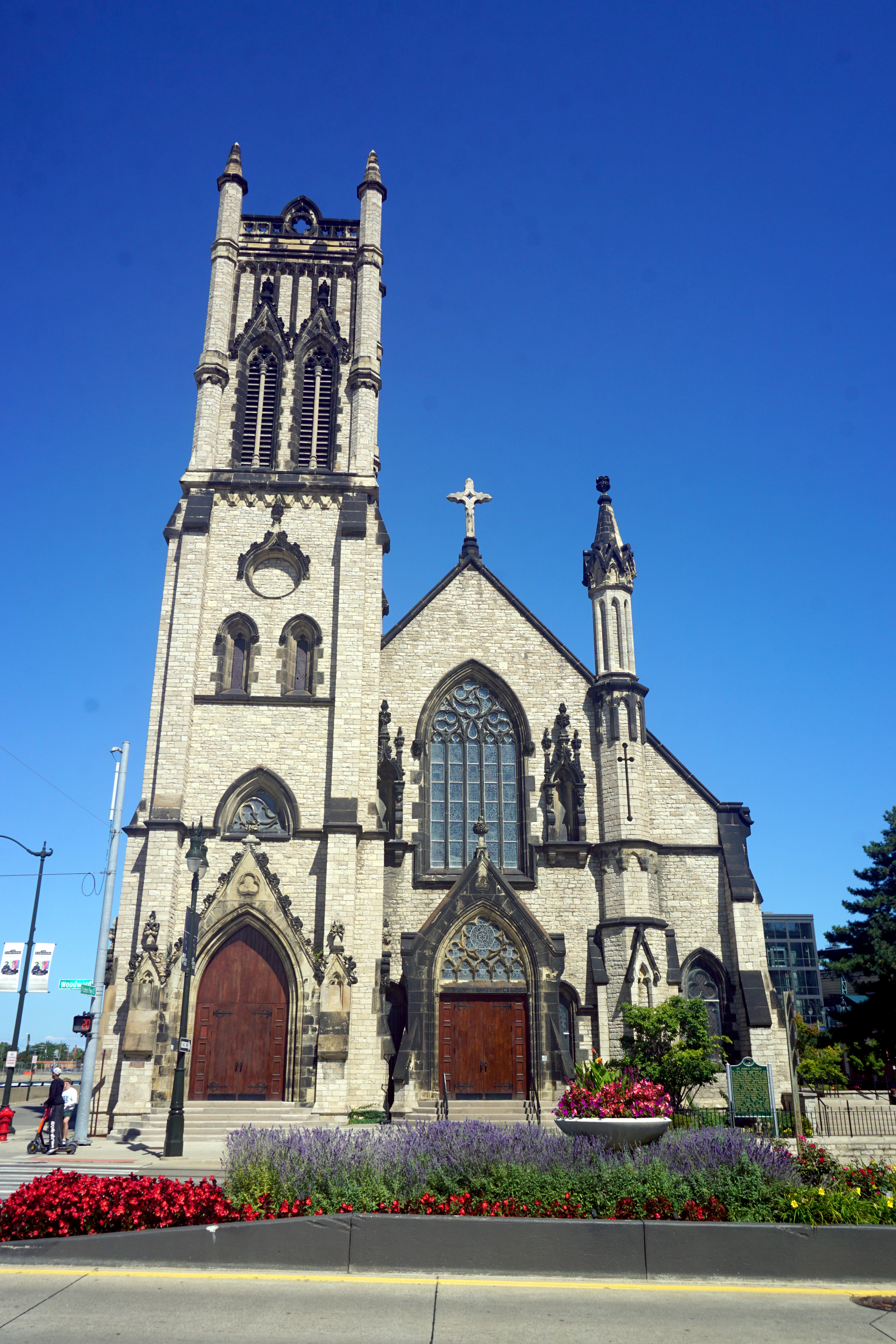
- St John's Episcopal Church
- Denomination: Episcopal Church
- Churchmanship: High Church
- Website: www.stjohnsdetroit.org

History
- Dedication: Saint John the Apostle

Administration
- Province: V
- Diocese: Episcopal Diocese of Michigan

Clergy
- Rector: The Rev. Steven Kelly, SSC
- St. John's Episcopal Church
- U.S. National Register of Historic Places
- Michigan State Historic Site
- Location: 2326 Woodward Avenue; Detroit, Michigan
- Coordinates: 42°20′23.51″N 83°3′8.84″W
- Built: 1859
- Architect: Jordan & Anderson
- Architectural style: Gothic Revival
- MPS: Religious Structures of Woodward Ave. TR
- NRHP reference No.: 82002906

Significant dates
- Added to NRHP: August 3, 1982
- Designated MSHS: June 10, 1987

St. John's Episcopal Church is an antebellum-era church located at 2326 Woodward Avenue (at the corner of Woodward and the Fisher Freeway service drive) in Downtown Detroit, Michigan. It is the oldest church still standing on Woodward Avenue, an area once called Piety Hill for its large number of religious buildings. The church was listed on the National Register of Historic Places in 1982 and designated a Michigan State Historic Site in 1987.

== History ==
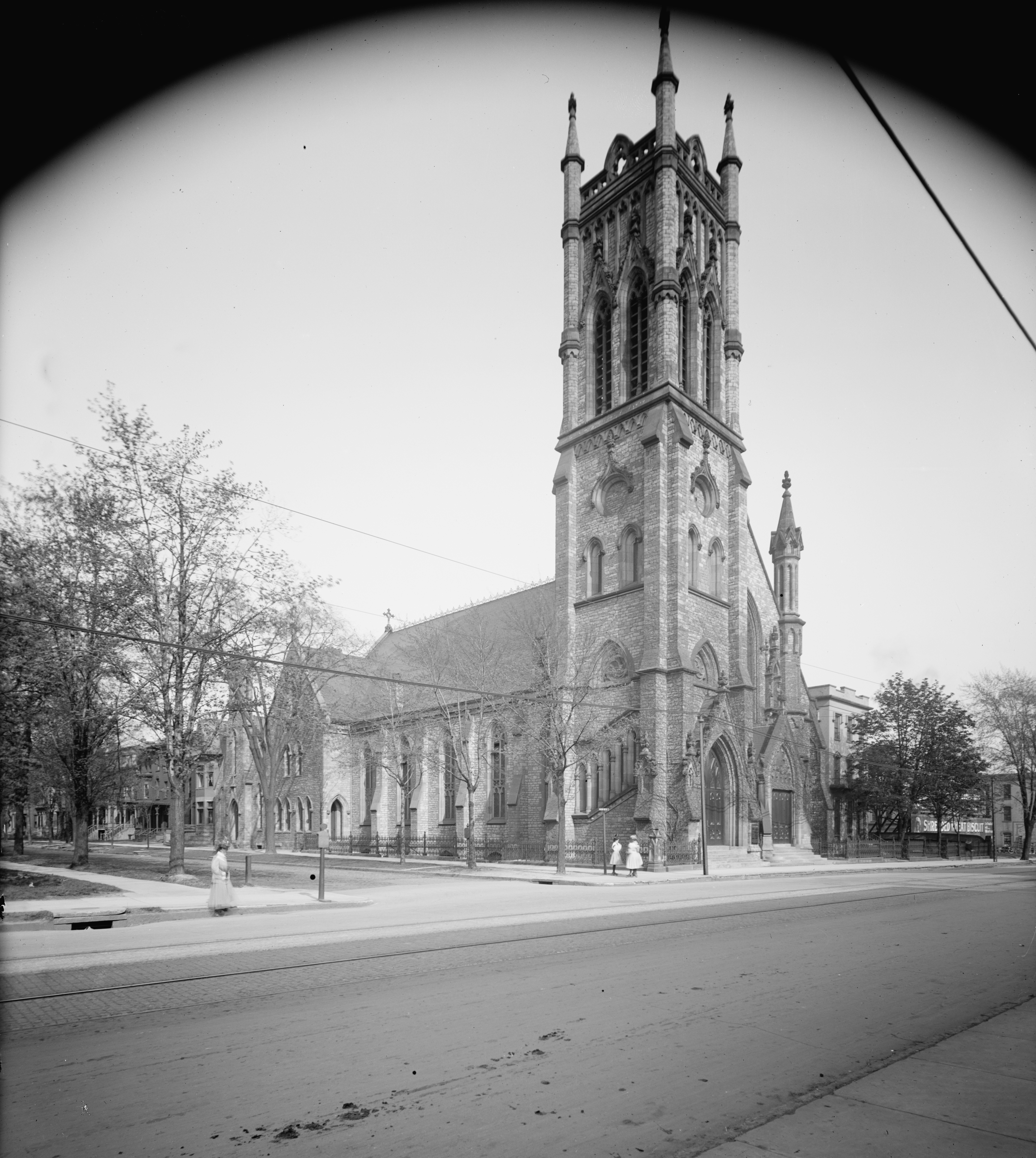
St. John's Episcopal Church c. 1905

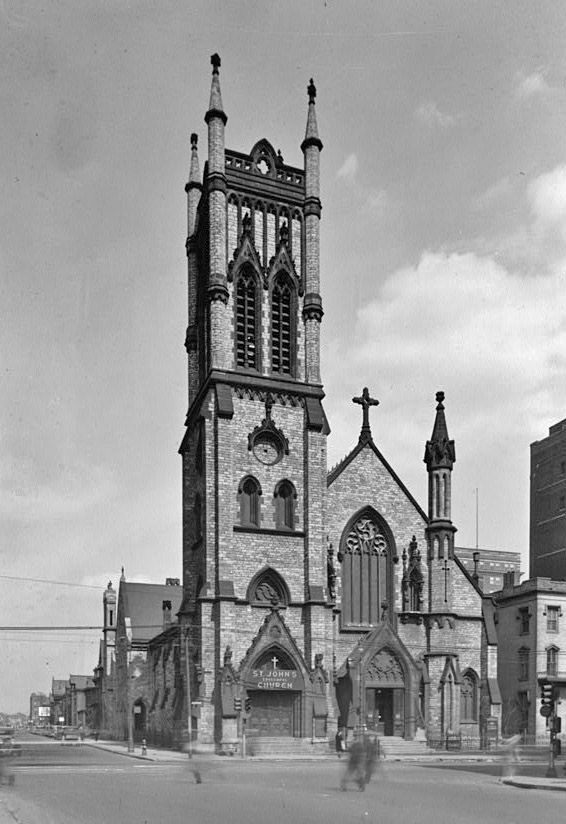
St. John's Episcopal Church in 1934

The parish of St. John's was organized in Detroit in 1858, primarily due to the efforts of Henry Porter Baldwin, a successful merchant who later became governor of Michigan and a United States senator. Porter purchased and donated the property, which was then on the northern outskirts of Detroit's city limits at the corner of Woodward and High Street (now Interstate 75). He also donated the money to build a rectory and a 150-seat chapel, designed by Jordan & Anderson.

When the chapel was dedicated in 1859, it proved too small for the burgeoning congregation. A new church was commissioned from Jordan & Anderson and quickly constructed; it was consecrated on December 10, 1861.

Today the church congregation is unusual among those of the modern Episcopal Church, as it uses the traditional 1928 edition of the Book of Common Prayer. Some weekday services use the Anglican Missal, rather than the newer 1979 edition Book of Common Prayer.

== Architecture ==
St. John's is an example of Victorian Gothic Revival architecture, measuring 170 feet by 65 feet. The belfry, the tallest section of the building, rises 105 feet. The bulk of the exterior is rubble limestone, with the trim made of Kelly Island sandstone. The side walls and roof are supported by buttresses and hammer beam trusses. Decorative gargoyles festoon the roof line and hood moldings above the windows and doors. The interior has galleries cantilevered on three sides; originally there were no intermediary piers to support the roof, giving the church an auditorium feel.

There are six memorial stained glass windows on either side of the nave. These were installed between 1880 and 1954. The upper portions of the windows, above the stained glass, are still the original grisaille and colored glass. The great west window was dedicated in 1963.

The altar, installed in 1873, is constructed of white Caen stone; it serves as a memorial to the mother of then-Rector George Worthington. Most of the rest of the chancel furnishings were donated as memorials during the renovations in 1892. These include the screen made from wrought iron and Caen stone, the harmonizing pulpit, and the brass lectern. Hand-carved oak clergy and choir stalls were added following the 1936 renovation.

There have been two major architectural alterations to St. John's since the church was built. The first, in 1892, deepened the chancel to create space for the organ console and the choir. This alteration required that the original chapel be taken down and rebuilt ten feet farther east. In 1936, due to the widening of Woodward Avenue, the entire church and chapel were moved 60 feet backwards.

The oldest part of the church, the chapel, still stands, and includes a number of stained glass windows. A State of Michigan historical marker now marks the church.
