= Caleb Lysander Howe =

American photographer (1810–1896)

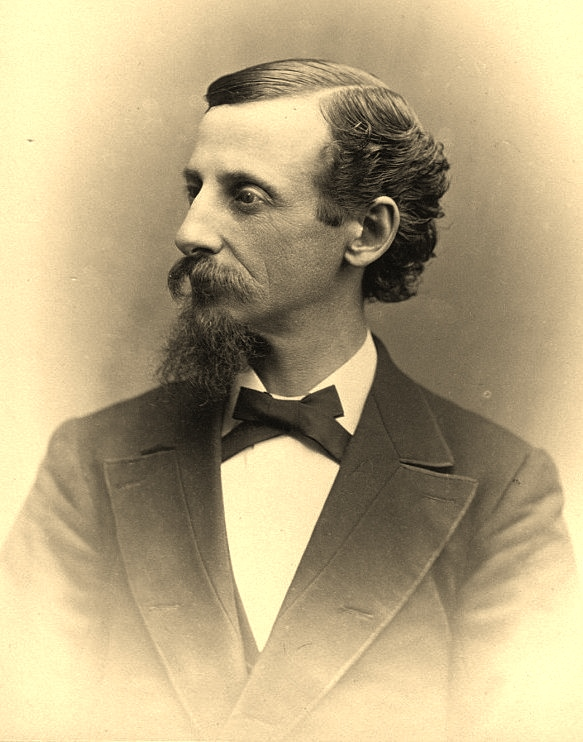
- Born: September 23, 1810; Dummerston, Vermont, U.S.
- Died: March 14, 1896 (aged 85); Wilmington, Vermont, U.S.
- Resting place: Prospect Hill Cemetery, Brattleboro, Vermont, U.S.
- Occupation: Photographer
- Known for: Portraits
- Spouse(s): Cynthia Sherman; Batchelder Simonds

Caleb Lysander Howe (September 23, 1810 – March 14, 1896) was an American photographer.

== Early life and education ==
Howe was born in Dummerston, Vermont, the son of Caleb and Sophia Sheldon Howe. His family moved to Dover, Vermont, when he was young.

== Career ==
Howe began his career as a farmer. He worked circa 1830–1849 as a jeweler and watchmaker in Dover, and then later in Brattleboro, Vermont, where he had moved to work at a machine shop. Howe moved back to Dover and was making his living as a farmer and a singing teacher in the wintertime.

He met an itinerant daguerreotype photographer who had set up a temporary studio near Howe's farm in 1852. Howe bought out the photographer's business for three hundred dollars and started a career in photography. The photographer had not stayed around long enough to teach Howe the process, so he had to speak to other photographers, including traveling to Boston to learn how to make photographic prints.

Howe worked as an itinerant photographer, temporarily setting up a gallery in North Adams, Massachusetts. He moved back to Brattleboro the next year, because North Adams had "an element of the population that did not appeal" due to work occurring nearby at the Hoosac Tunnel. Howe traveled through Windham County and Bennington County in Vermont, as well parts of New Hampshire, stopping for a week or two to set up a studio.

He purchased a studio from local photographer J. L. Lovell. There was a lot of demand for his portraits of local people including Civil War soldiers. Howe would often do twenty to forty photographic sittings in a day. He employed two of his sons, N. Sherman Howe and John C. Howe, at the studio as well as other photographers. A daguerreotype from the Howe studio would be 1.5 x 2 inches, set in a small gilt frame behind glass, and would sell for a dollar.

The firm became known as C. L. Howe & Sons in 1865. Howe shifted photographic formats as they became available, creating ambrotypes and tintypes in addition to prints on paper. Many early images of Brattleboro are from his studio.

== Death and legacy ==
Howe died on March 14, 1896, after a short illness. He is buried in Prospect Hill Cemetery in Brattleboro.

His 1869 photograph Blake Block, Brattleboro, Vermont, after the Fire is held by the Smithsonian American Art Museum. Several of his stereoscopes are in the Robert N. Dennis collection of stereoscopic views at the New York Public Library.

== Personal life ==
Howe was married twice—the first time to Cynthia Sherman on October 1, 1832, in Dover, Vermont. They had five children, two of whom survived into adulthood. His second marriage was to Martha Batchelder Simonds on May 24, 1848. They also had five children, including opera singer Mary Howe.

== Images ==
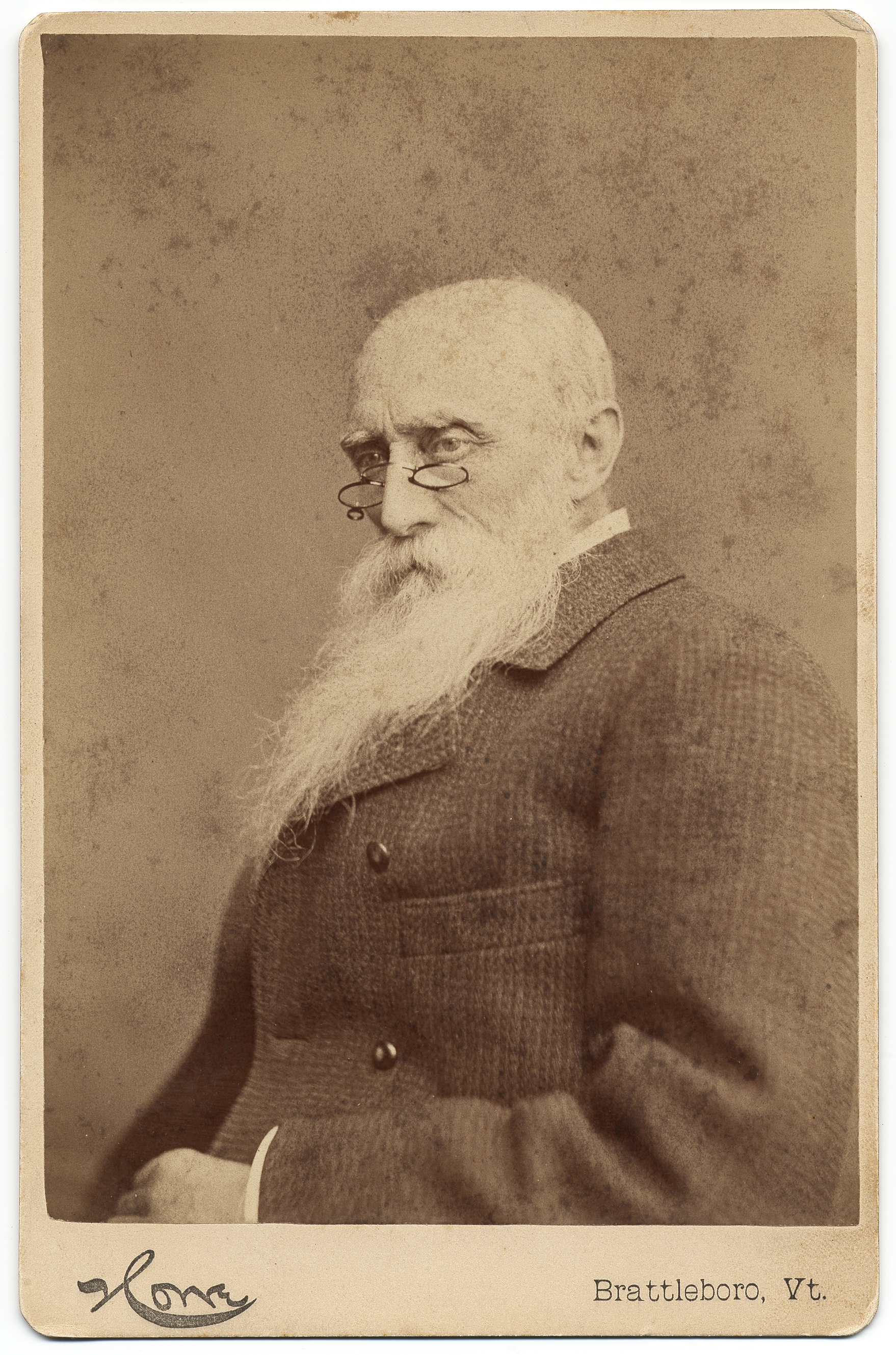
Cabinet card of William Morris Hunt from Howe's studio c. 1879

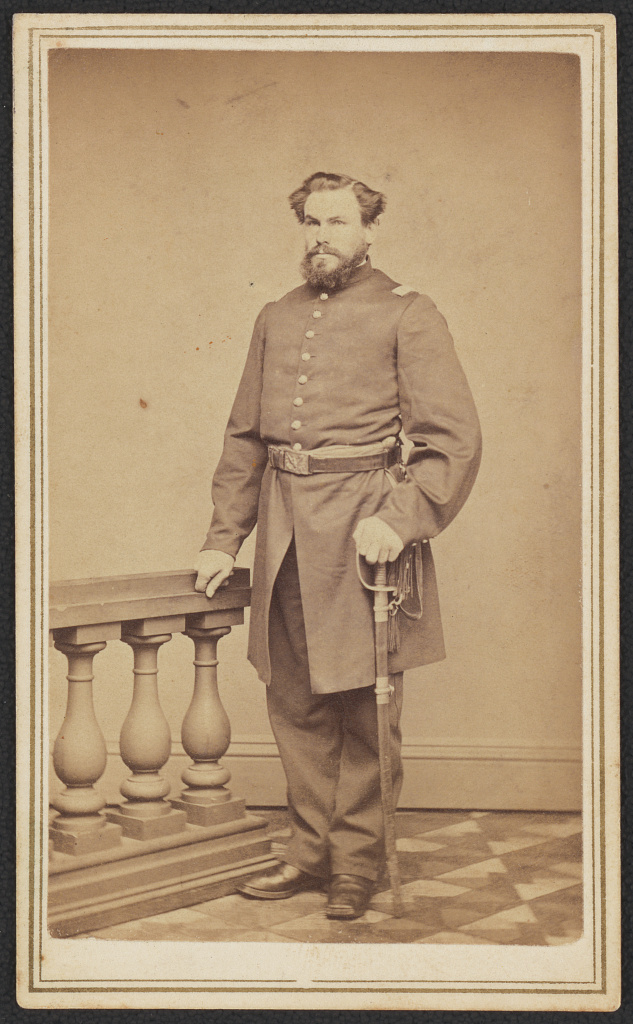
Captain Charles Dwight Merriman taken by C. L. Howe

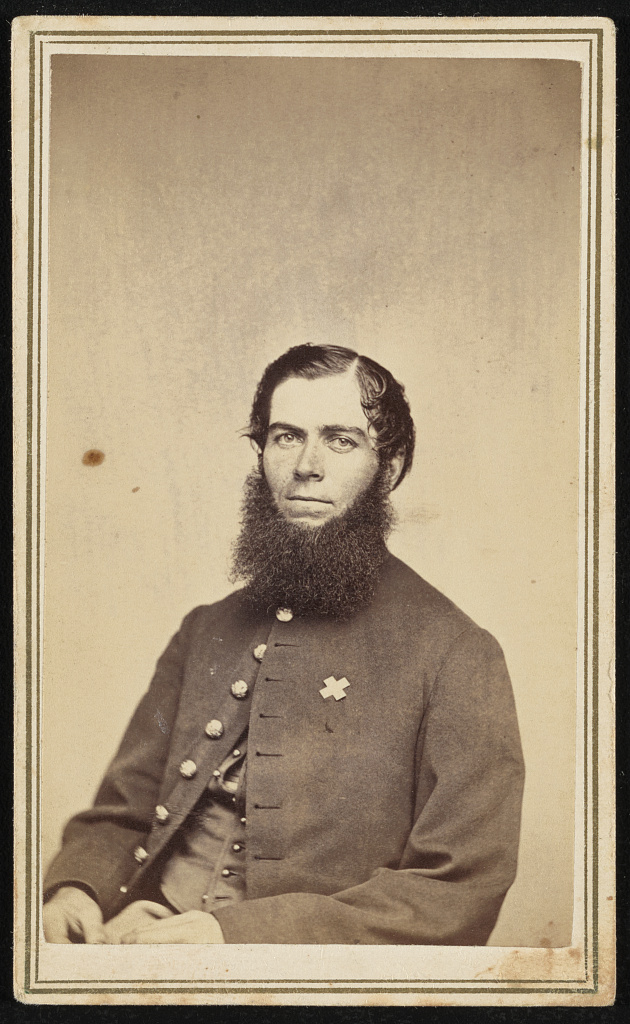
Private J.M.B. of Co. K, 5th Vermont Volunteer Infantry Regiment

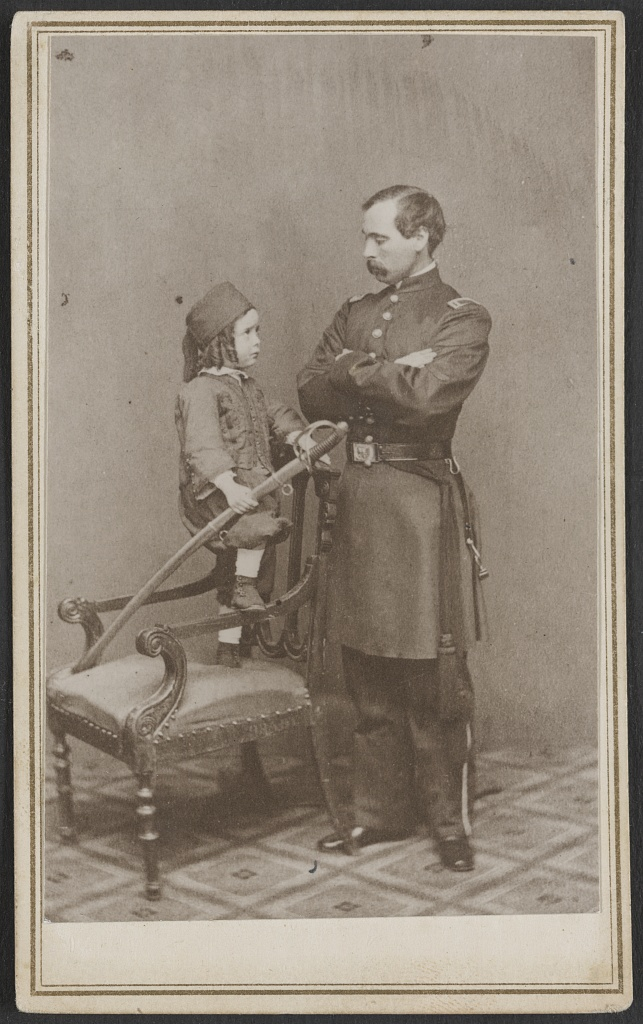
Unidentified soldier in Union first lieutenant's uniform

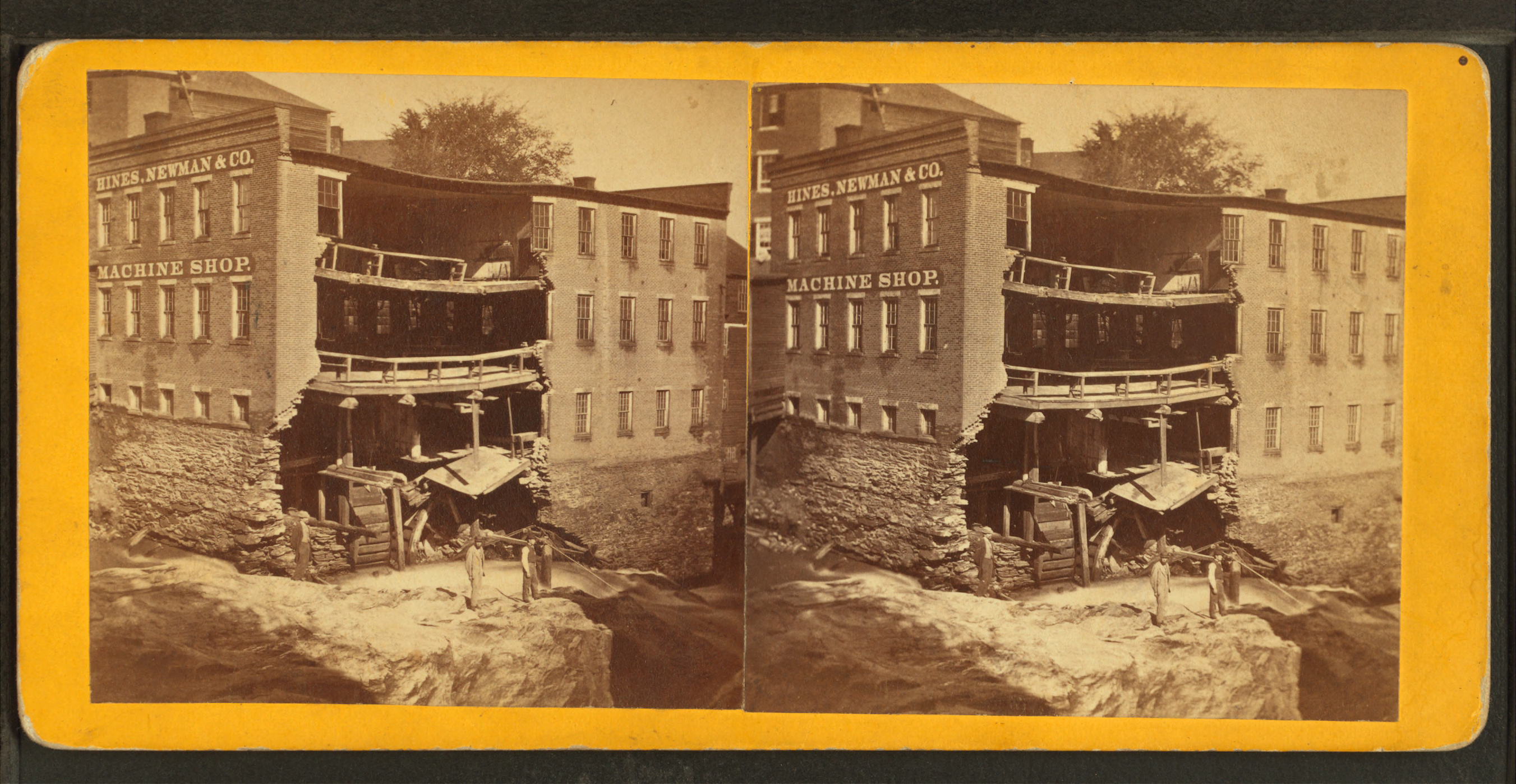
Flood Damage to machine shop

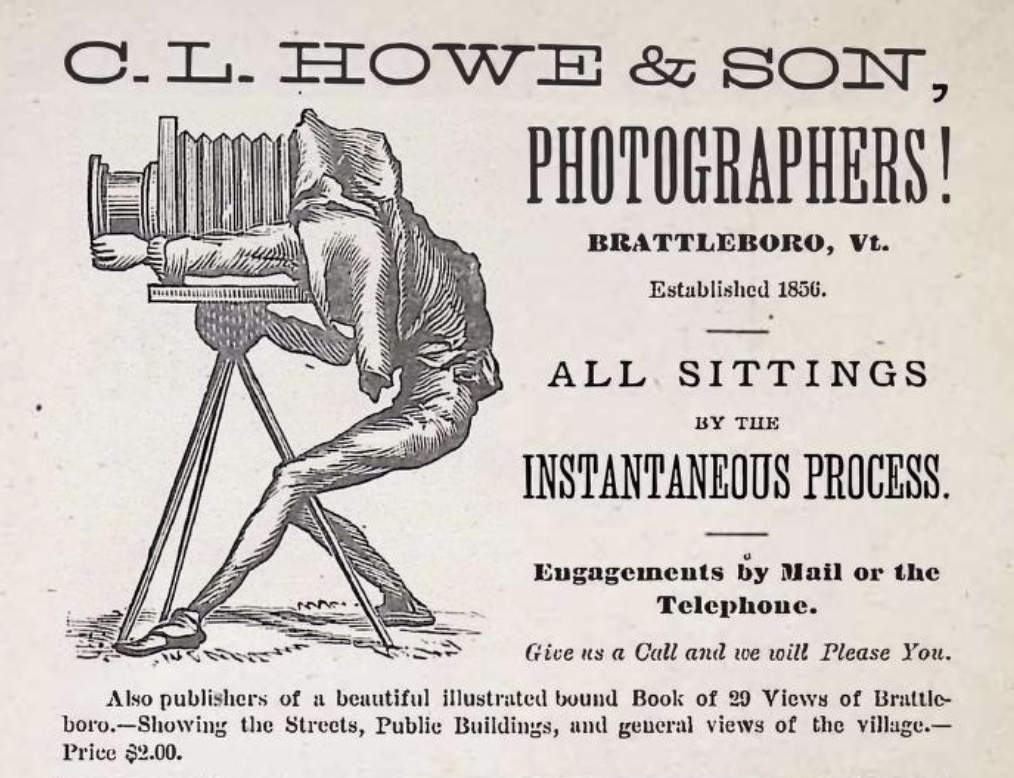
1885 studio advertisement

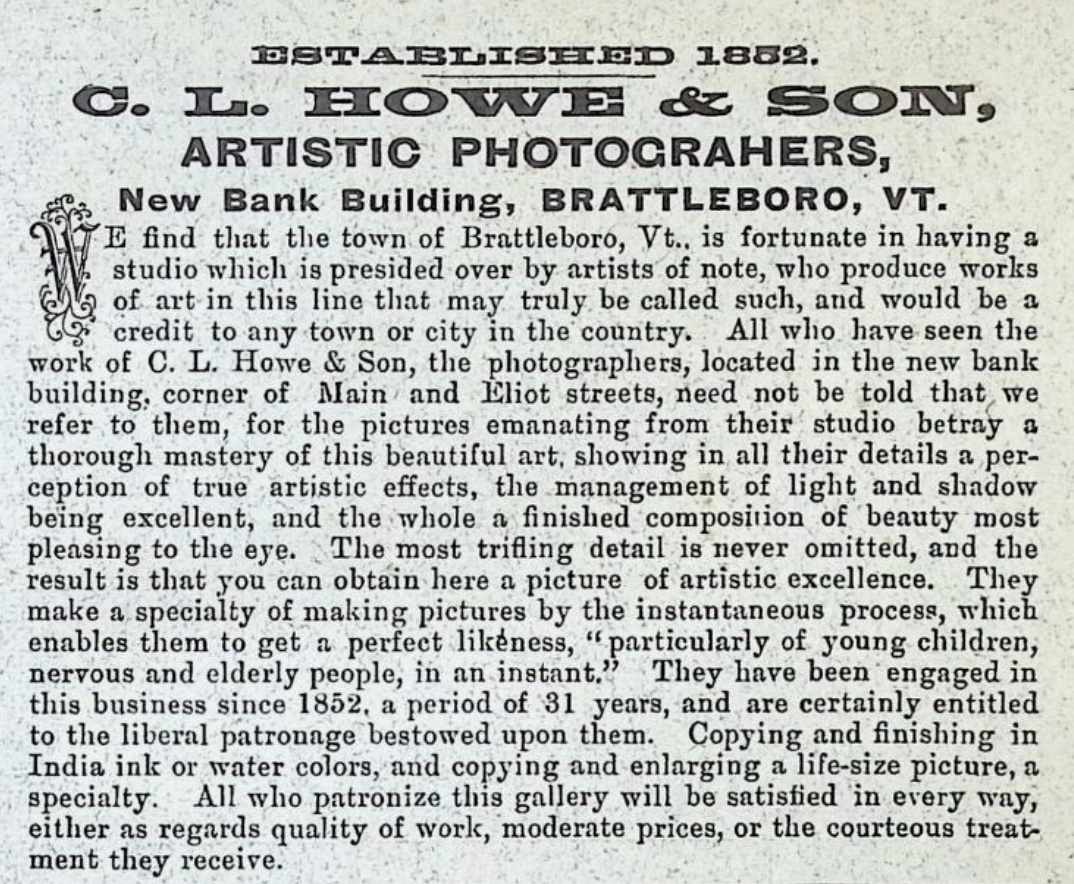
1883 studio advertisement
