= Fort Street Presbyterian Church (Detroit) =

Historic church in Michigan, United States

- U.S. National Register of Historic Places
- Michigan State Historic Site
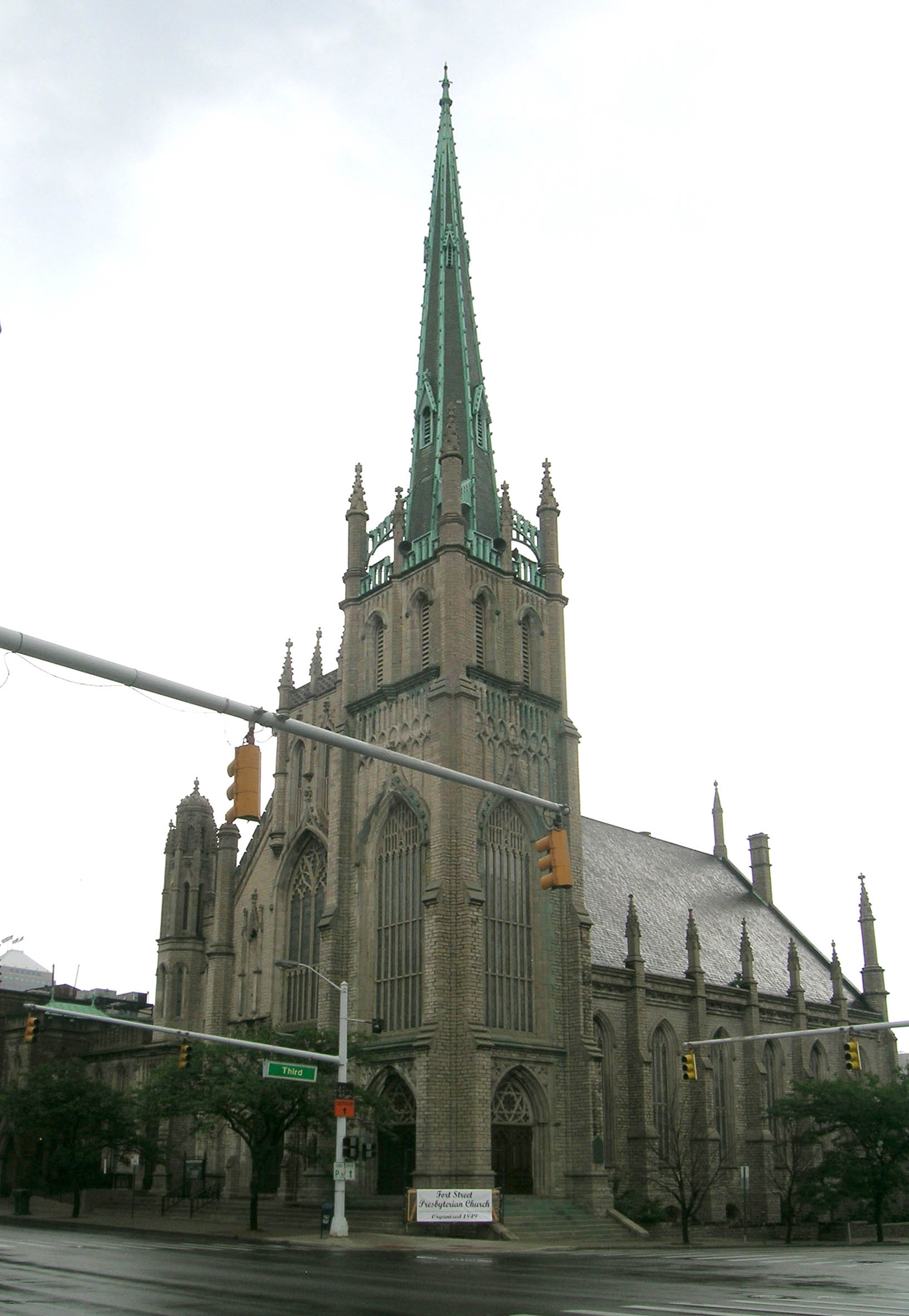
- Fort Street Presbyterian Church from the northwest
- Interactive map
- Location: 631 West Fort Street; Detroit, Michigan
- Coordinates: 42°19′39″N 83°3′14″W
- Built: 1855, 1877
- Architect: O. & A. Jordan
- Architectural style: Gothic Revival
- NRHP reference No.: 71000424

Significant dates
- Added to NRHP: September 03, 1971
- Designated MSHS: March 3, 1971

The Fort Street Presbyterian Church is located at 631 West Fort Street in Detroit, Michigan. It was constructed in 1855, and completely rebuilt in 1877. The church was listed on the National Register of Historic Places and designated a Michigan State Historic Site in 1971. Its steeple stands 265 ft (81 m), making it one of the tallest churches in the United States.

== Early history ==
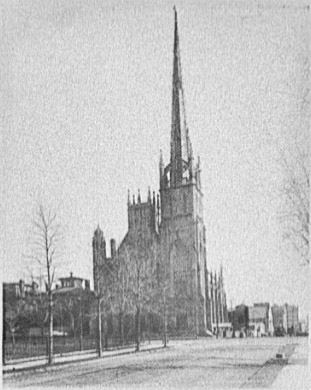
Fort Street Presbyterian Church c. 1900-1906

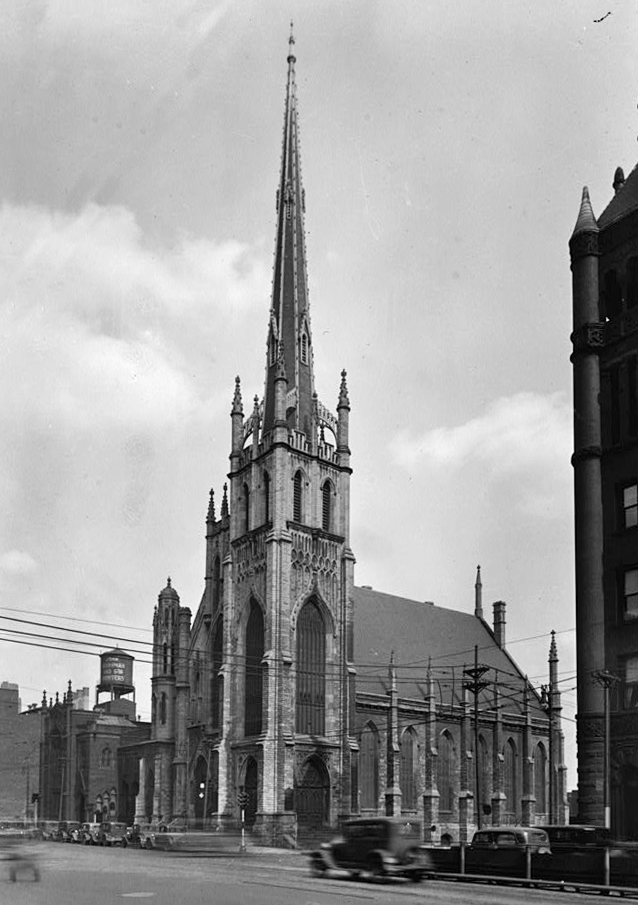
Fort Street Presbyterian Church 1934

The lot for the church was purchased from Mr. Shadrack and Mary (Stead) Gillett, whose home was located there prior to the construction of the church. The population of Detroit grew rapidly in the 1830s and 1840s, in particular bringing an influx of English Protestants to the city. In 1849, Reverend Robert Kellogg organized the Second Presbyterian Church, with 26 charter members. The congregation met for worship in the old Capitol building until it constructed a church on the corner of Lafayette and Wayne Street the next year.

== Construction and reconstruction ==
In 1852, Albert Jordan and his brother Octavius arrived in Detroit from Hartford, Connecticut, and soon established a place among the leading architects of the city. In the mid-1850s, despite a membership of only 167 people, the Second Presbyterian congregation hired the Jordans to design a new, larger church. The location the congregation picked was on Fort Street just west of downtown; at that time, the area was a popular residential district and home to many prominent citizens who were also members of the congregation, such as Russell A. Alger, James F. Joy (Henry B. Joy's father), Theodore S. Buhl, Henry D. Shelden, and Zachariah Chandler. After the move, the congregation changed its name to the Fort Street Presbyterian Church.

The original church was completed in 1855 at a cost of $70,000. The construction cost prevented the congregation from fully finishing the interior until 15 years later, when it installed the gallery and pews conforming to the original design.

However, the building was destroyed by fire in 1876, completely demolishing the interior, destroying the roof, and sending the spire crashing onto Fort Street. The church was rebuilt according to the original architectural plans the following year being completed on June 10, 1877. Another major fire in 1914 again destroyed the roof, but the church was again rebuilt, and it remains as it had been designed by the Jordan brothers in the mid-1850s. Upon completion, the current church with its steeple at 265 ft (81 m) ranked as the tallest building in the city and state from 1877 to 1909, and is among the tallest churches in the United States.

== Architecture ==
The Fort Street Presbyterian Church is an ornately detailed Gothic Revival structure built of limestone ashlar from Malden, Ontario. The facade features a 265 feet (81 m) tall square tower with spire on one side with a shorter octagonal turret (modeled after King's College Chapel in Cambridge) on the other. A central stained glass window illuminates the sanctuary. There are seven bays along the side of the church with flying buttresses, crocketed finials, lacy stonework and tall windows, designed to give the impression of lightness.

The interior of the sanctuary features a three-aisle nave and a horseshoe balcony capable of seating almost 1,000 people. The pews are of hand-carved black walnut and the baptismal font is constructed of Caen stone, supported by onyx columns imported from Mexico. Tiles dotting the stone floor are early works of Mary Chase Perry Stratton, founder of Pewabic Pottery. The solid brass lectern, in the shape of an eagle, was exhibited at the 1893 World's Columbian Exposition in Chicago.

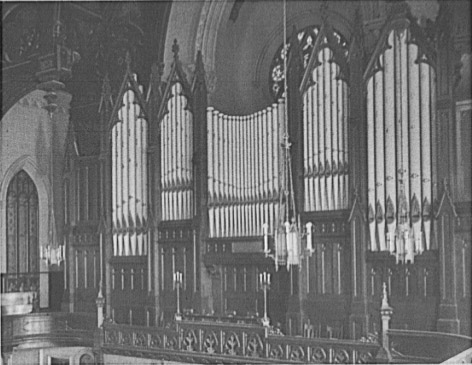
Church Organ c. 1900-1915

The church organ was built in 1914 by Wangerian-Weickhardt, and contains 3,253 pipes ranging in length from 1/4 inch to 16 feet. It incorporates a small portion of the original 1855 organ.

=== Significance ===
The Fort Street Presbyterian Church exemplifies an important step in the rise of "revivalist" architecture in 19th-century America. American architects of the mid-19th century imported and re-interpreted the English Gothic Revival style, based on the visually lush details of Medieval cathedrals. The American architects copied the "Gothic" elements and combined them with simple building plans to create an American architectural style known as "Victorian Gothic". The Jordan brothers subscribed to this ethic, and their Fort Street Presbyterian Church, as well as being one of Michigan's oldest churches, is a premier example of Victorian Gothic architecture. The church has remained essentially unchanged despite fires there in 1877 and 1914.

== Later history ==
In the early 20th century, the church began focusing more on social service programs, as people of more modest incomes moved into the surrounding, formerly aristocratic, area. In 1908, James Joy donated property adjoining the church, and Mrs. Oren Scotten gave $50,000 to pay for the construction of the Church House. This enabled the church to minister to the newer congregants, and the church used the gymnasium in the Church House as a kind of "health club," enrolling men, women, and children in gym classes. The church also sponsored one of the first Boy Scout troops west of the Alleghenies. Internationally known tenor William Lavin was a resident singer at the church during the first quarter of the 20th century.

Membership grew steadily up through the middle of the Great Depression; however, membership, revenue, and attendance fell off afterward. In the early 1940s, plans were afoot to close the expensive church and perhaps pool with other congregations to open a combined church elsewhere in the city. However, World War II intervened. During the war, the church converted the gymnasium of the Church House into a dormitory for servicemen who were arriving at Fort Street Union Depot located across Third Street. By the war's end, the church had provided transient accommodations for 60,000 men.

== See also ==
- List of tallest buildings in Detroit
