= Mary Howe (soprano) =

American opera singer

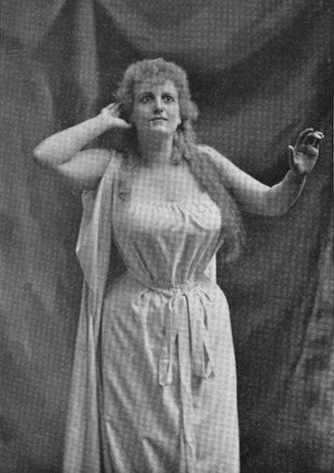
- Mary Howe (in Grand Opera)
- Born: 1870; Brattleboro, Vermont, U.S.
- Died: 1952 (aged 81–82); South Lancaster, Massachusetts, U.S.
- Other names: Mary Howe-Lavin, Mary Howe Burton
- Occupation: soprano
- Years active: 1880-1905
- Spouses: William Lavin; Edward Burton (m. 1905)

Mary Howe (married names, Mary Howe-Lavin and Mary Howe Burton; 1870–1952) was an American operatic soprano, well known in Germany in the 1880s and 1890s. She inherited her musical talents from her father, a choir leader, and chorister, and received early training from a brother, who was a pianist. Howe retired from the stage in 1905 and died in 1952.

== Family and education ==
Mary Howe was born in Brattleboro, Vermont, in 1870. Of New England ancestry, her father was Caleb Lysander Howe, a photographer, and Martha Batchelder (Simonds) Howe. She had six siblings, N. Sherman, Fred, Alice, Jeanette, John C., and Lucien. She inherited her musical talent from her father, who was a successful choir leader and chorister for many years. Her brother Lucien was an accomplished musician, having attained a reputation as a pianist.

Howe's childhood was spent at home. She was often told that she could sing a tune before she could walk alone. When a little girl, she wanted to be a "big singer," and her greatest delight was to put on an old calico apron for a "trail," make a stage of old boxes and give concerts. Her first public experience on the stage was at the age of four, in a little cantata given by children. Her second, at the age of nine, was in an operetta called "The Quarrel Among the Flowers." She had the part of "The Dahlia," and did so well in it that from that time on, unusual things were expected of her.

Howe's first teacher in singing and instrumental music was her brother, Lucien Howe. At the age of nine or eleven, she took the part of "Josephine" in a children's performance of H.M.S. Pinafore. . As she had to lead the chorus as well, the effort proved to be somewhat of a strain on her voice, and she was not allowed to sing much during the next year. Her first concert of importance was in 1880, at Newfane, Vermont. In the early 1880s, when Howe was in her teens and unknown to musical fame outside of her native town, she made her debut in Western Vermont as a concert singer. The occasion was the opening concert of the first festival of the Rutland Music Festival Association. She scored a marked artistic success, and at once established herself in popular favor.

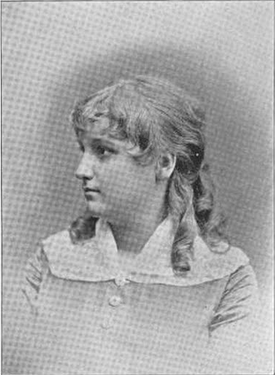
Mary Howe, age 14

The first money Howe ever earned by singing was paid to her as soprano in a church choir in her home town when she was 14. Her father, at that time 70 years of age, but still retaining a strong, clear, tenor voice, was the choir leader. At the age of 16, she went with her brother to Boston, where he was continuing his musical studies. She had vocal lessons of Charles R. Adams and profited greatly by his training. At home during the next summer, she became acquainted with Aline Osgood, the soprano, whose encouragement and example at this time were invaluable to Howe. She spent part of the following winter in Philadelphia with Mrs. Osgood, and continued her studies with Prof. Siegfried Behrens, the teacher and conductor. The following year, she went abroad in company with her brother, and for two years studied singing and acting in the school of Auguste Götze in Dresden.

== Career ==
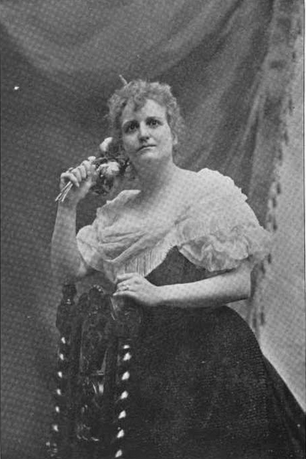
Mary Howe (1896)

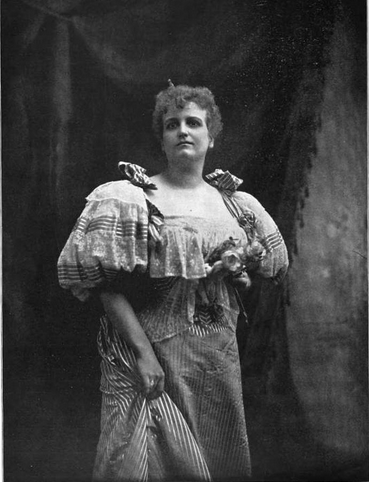
Mary Howe-Lavin

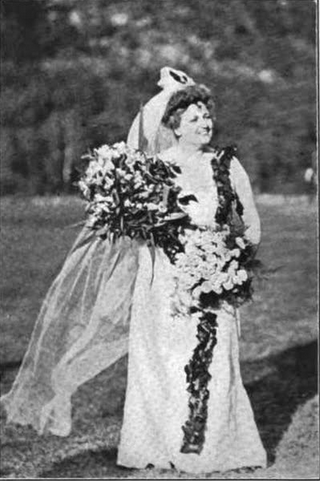
Mary Howe Burton

=== Early years ===
During the second year in Dresden, Howe sang in concerts in that city and several smaller German cities. In May, 1888, came the opportunity for a first trial in Grand Opera, at Kroll Opera House in Berlin. Her first role was that of "Amina" in La Sonnambula. Having pleased the public and the critics, she was given a three months’ engagement, and sang also the leading soprano part in Lucia and Il Barbier di Sesiglia. One of the foremost critics in Berlin said of her: "At nineteen years of age she shows more signs of being a second Patti than any woman in the world. I do not say now that she is a second Patti, but I do assert that she will be a formidable rival in a few years."

At the close of this engagement, Howe returned home to Brattleboro. The great interest and goodwill of home friends was shown on the occasion of a testimonial concert in August 1888. In September, she sang at two concerts of the Worcester, Massachusetts, music festival. After giving a few concerts in New England cities, she decided to go abroad again for the purpose of continuing her studies for the operatic stage. In company with her brother, she went to Paris, and there had lessons with Mathilde Marchesi. Later, she studied with Luigi Vannuccini in Florence, Italy.

=== Howe-Lavin ===
By the mid-1890s, nearly every large city, and many smaller ones, east of the Mississippi River had heard Howe in concert, and the chief music festivals of the country had her name at one time or another at the head of the list of artists announced as attractions.

After Howe's marriage to William Lavin, the tenor, she changed her name to Mary Howe-Lavin. In 1897, it was reported that during the past year, Howe-Lavin had been singing as "guest" in many of the German opera houses. At Stettin, they called her a nightingale, and said it was not merely astonishing but actually incredible that such a tone could come from a human throat. Another journal in the same city said that in the whole compass of the round earth at this time no other such singer was anywhere to be found. This was for her Violetta in "Traviata. At Danzig, her first appearances were in Rossini's Barber of Seville, and they praised her spontaneous and delightful comedy, but returned immediately to the fundamental note of all her critiques, the magical beauty of her voice. She introduced the famous virtuoso piece from Félicien David's Perle de Brazil, and a Frühlingsstimmen, by Strauss. In Augsburg, she began in Lucia di Lammermoor, and they talked about the exquisite purity, agility, and pleasing quality of her tone as well as the unexampled richness of compass and expressive quality.

=== Retirement ===
Of the many photographs of Howe, nearly all were taken by her brother, John C. Howe. After marrying Edward Burton of Massachusetts on October 24, 1905, she retired. She died in 1952.
