= Charles Holman-Black =

American singer and painter

Charles Holman-Black was a singer and painter, born in Philadelphia, Pennsylvania. and lived in Indianapolis, Indiana, and Paris, France.. He performed as a baritone throughout the United States and Europe, including the People's Palace in London, New York City, and Binghamton, New York.

Holman-Black was considered a musical prodigy by his professors as a child. The son of noted music professor J. S. Black of Indianapolis, Holman-Black was initially trained by his father. He learned piano at age seven, counterpoint and harmony at age ten, and was a prominent church organist by age twelve. While a student in New York, Holman-Black toured Europe before accepting several roles in touring operas across the United States and Canada. Following his move to Paris, he was taught by the Italian tenor Signor Severini, Jean-Baptiste Faure, and Edmund Duvernoy at the Conservatoire de Paris, and he became the first American invited to perform for the famed La Trompette chamber music society.

Munsey's Magazine described Holman-Black as "the best known salon singer in Europe," with "a baritone of great compass and thrilling sweetness," while a profile in Werner's Voice praised Holman-Black's "style [as] perfect, phrasing broad, enunciation unequalled, and voice showing the perfect cultivation of a grand school." One Parisian critic in 1895 wrote that Holman-Black "has made for himself in Paris a position that is his own and is much envied. A singer who has been applauded in New York and in London, Holman Black has wished to receive the consecration that Paris only can give."

Holman-Black was the recipient of the Ordre des Palmes académiques in 1904 for his literary contributions, and became a member of the Société des Grandes Auditions Musicales in 1909. During World War I, he volunteered with the Red Cross to provide supplies to soldiers at Dinard, France.

He resided in Paris, France, with his adopted brother and partner, painter Frank Holman, where they owned a house and studio in Faubourg Saint-Germain and played host to several European and North American artists.
