= Louis Koemmenich =

American composer & conductor (1866–1922)

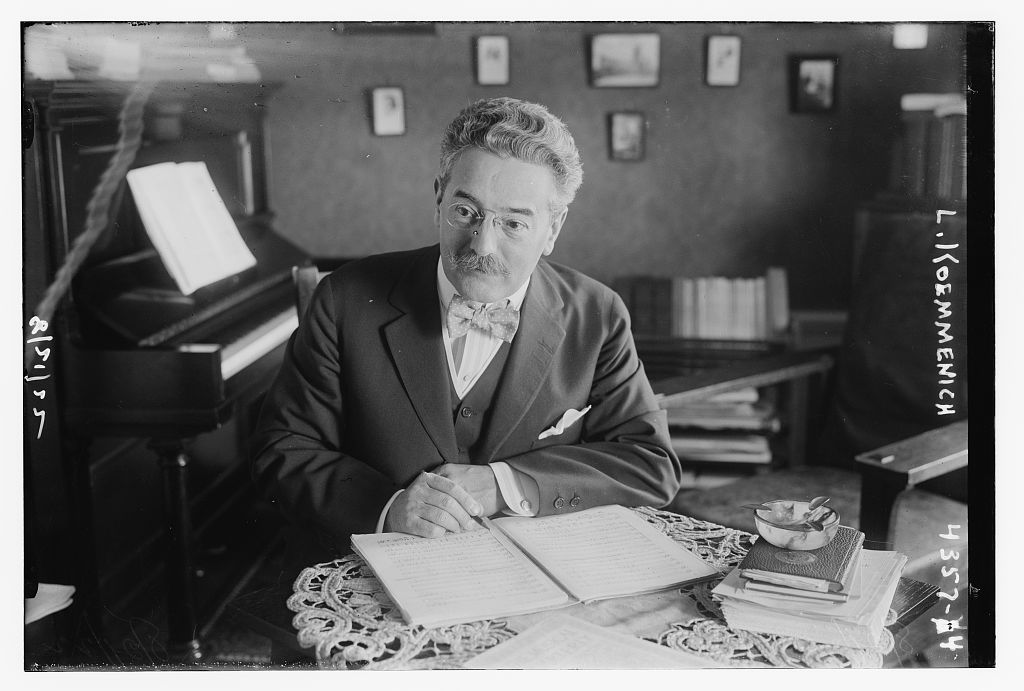
Louis Koemmenich sitting at his desk in 1917

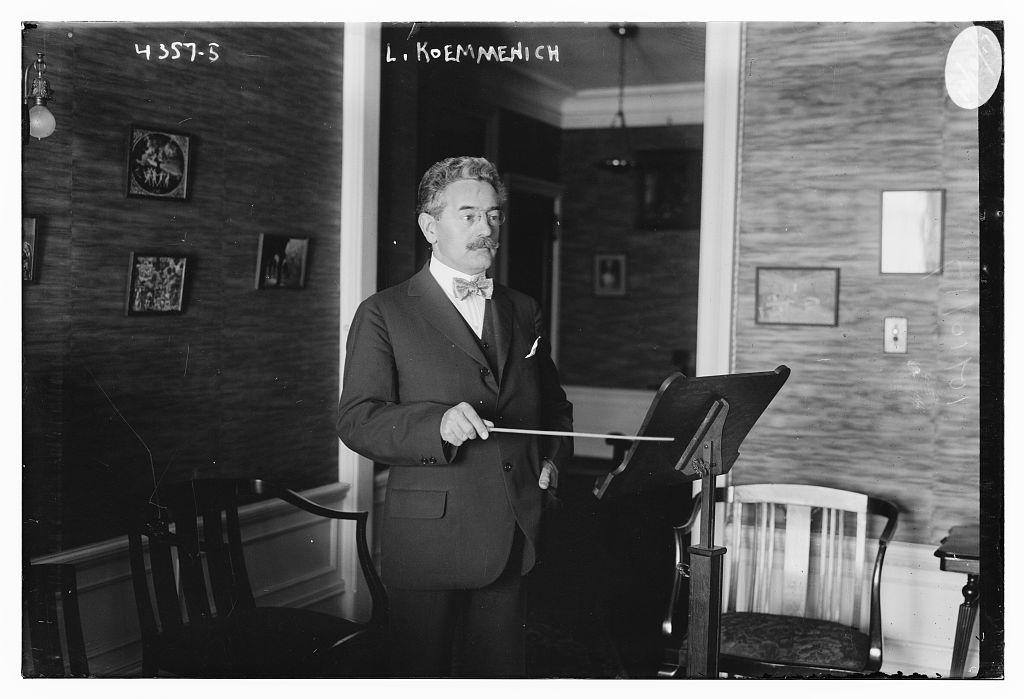
Louis Koemmenich in 1917

Louis Koemmenich (October 4, 1866 – August 14, 1922) was an American composer and conductor who died by suicide in 1922.

== Biography ==
He was born in Elberfeld, Kingdom of Prussia on October 4, 1866. He came to the United States in 1890. He was active as a choral conductor, and as a result wrote mainly choral music, although some of his songs are also extant. He conducted the Brooklyn Choral Union, the German Theatre in Philadelphia, the Mendelssohn Glee Club, the Beethoven Society, and the New Choral Society.

In 1916 he conducted several performances by the Oratorio Society of New York and the New York Philharmonic at Carnegie Hall.

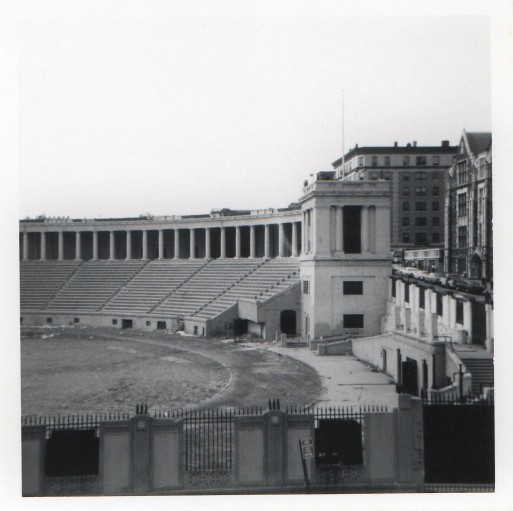
City College stadium, where Koemmenich conducted Percy MacKaye's vast masque Caliban

He was the conductor of the chorus and orchestra for a huge civic or community masque (with a cast of 1500 amateur performers) entitled Caliban by the Yellow Sands by Percy MacKaye which played at the New York City College Stadium (the Lewisohn Stadium) from 23 May to 5 June 1916, for the Shakespeare Tercentenary celebrations. The music was by Arthur Farwell.

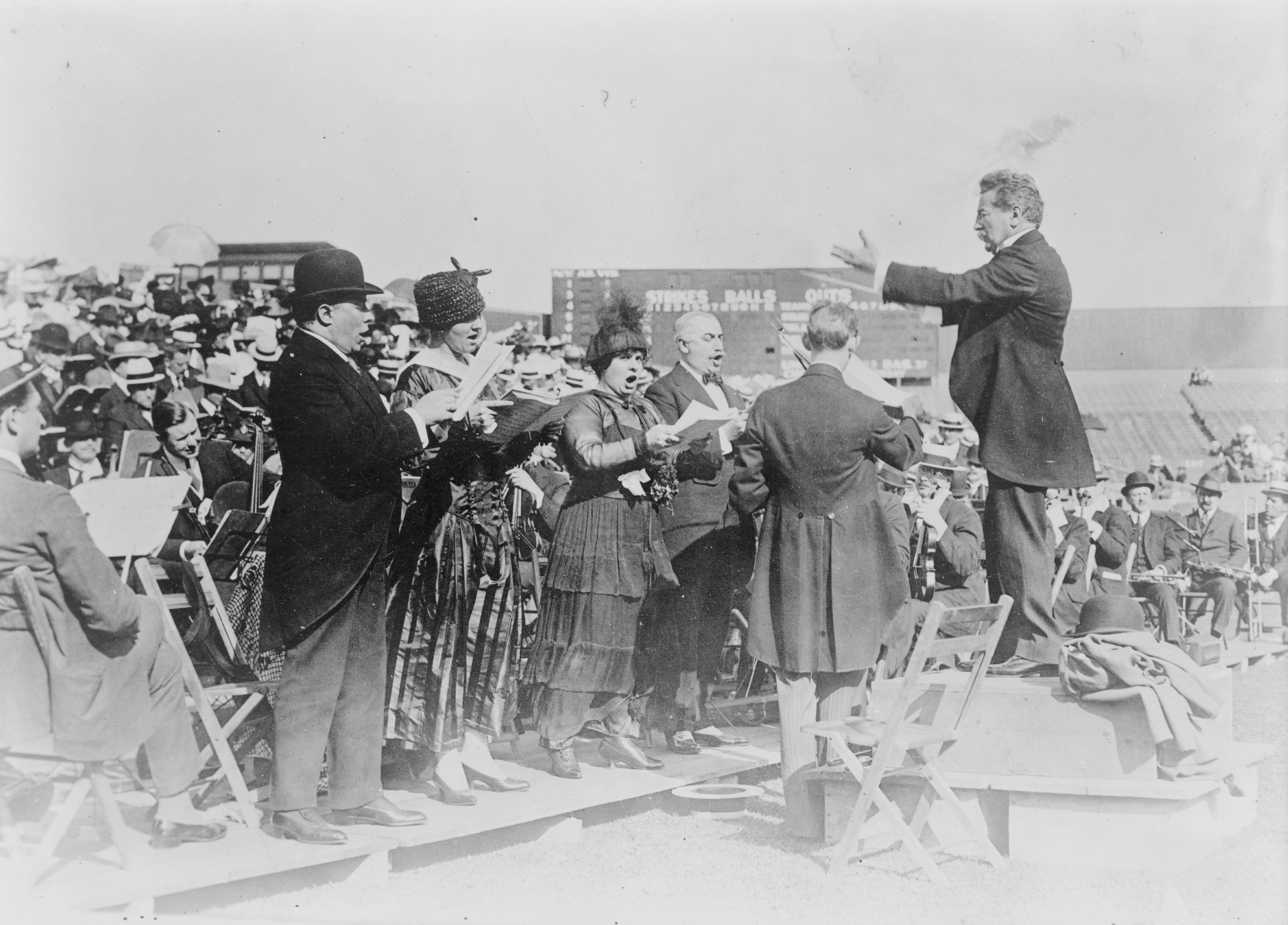
Koemmenich conducting Verdi's Requiem at the Polo Grounds, New York City, on 4 June 1916. The soloists are (from left to right) Giovanni Zenatello, Louise Homer, Maria Gay, and Léon Rothier.

Koemmenich also conducted an open-air performance of Giuseppe Verdi's Requiem at the Polo Grounds, New York City, on 4 June 1916. He conducted an augmented New York Philharmonic Orchestra of 120 players and a chorus of 1,200 singers, selected from leading local choral societies including the Oratorio Society of New York, the Peoples' Choral Union, the Beethoven Society and the Mendelssohn Glee Club. The soloists were Louise Homer (under the assumed name of 'Lucile Lawrence'), Maria Gay, her partner Giovanni Zenatello and Leon Rothier. Rehearsals had been going on for a month, possibly taken by Arnaldo Conti who was also billed as a conductor; but he seems not to have actually conducted during the performance.

In June 1917 two hundred members of the Oratorio Society held a protest meeting in Carnegie Hall because he had not been re-elected as conductor, a position he had held for five years.

Koemmenich killed himself with cooking gas on August 14, 1922, at 347 West 91st Street in Manhattan.
