= Polo Grounds =

Sports venue in New York City (1890–1963)

- "The Bathtub"
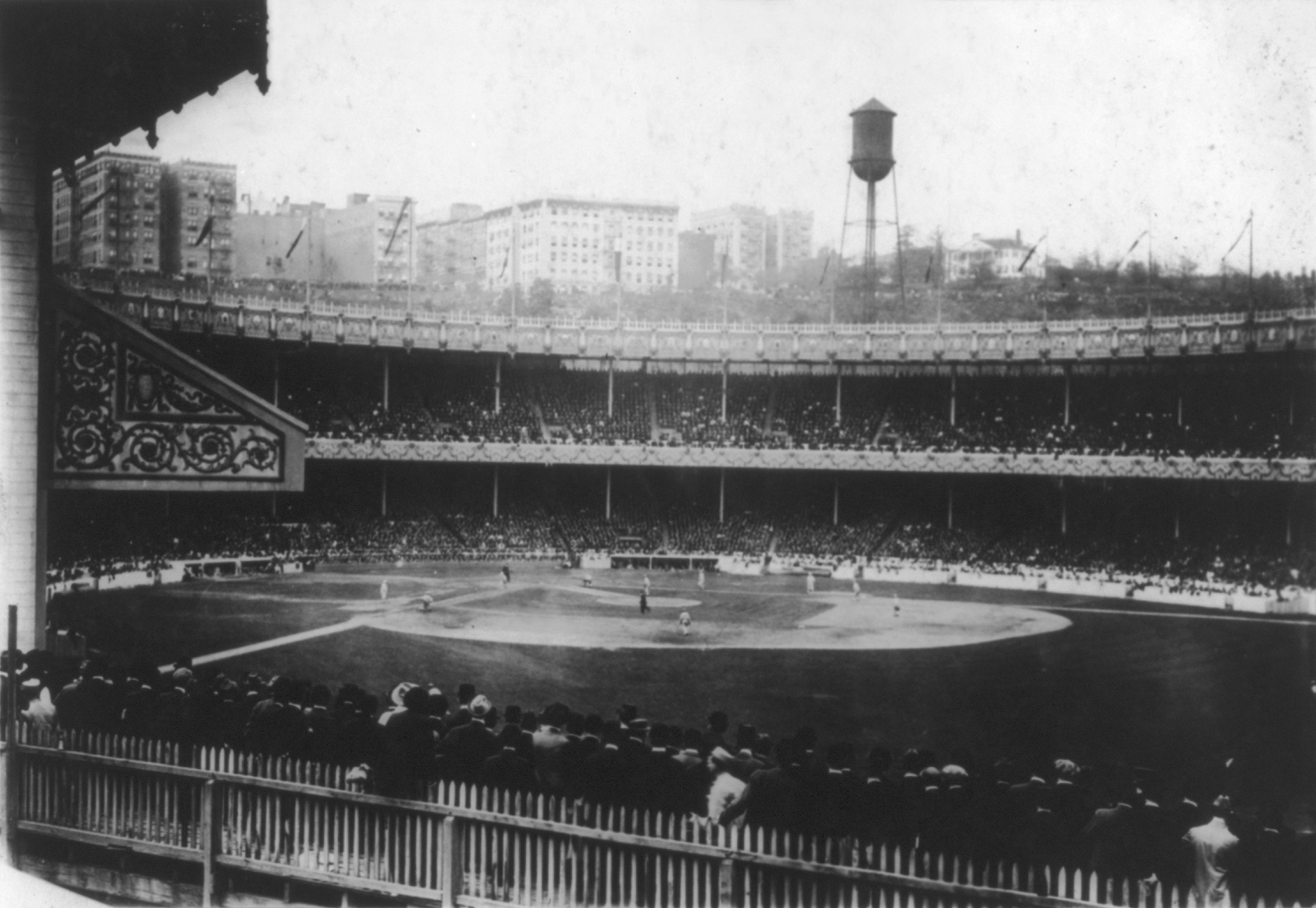
- Polo Grounds IV during the 1913 World Series (New York Giants and Philadelphia Athletics) (below) Site of the original Polo Grounds, 1876–1888, between 110th and 112th Street, Manhattan
- Interactive map of Polo Grounds
- Former names: Brotherhood Park (adjacent to Polo Grounds II, 1890); Brush Stadium (1911–1919)
- Location: bounded by West 155th Street, Frederick Douglass Blvd. and Harlem River Drive in Washington Heights, Manhattan, New York City
- Coordinates: 40°49′54″N 73°56′14″W Polo Grounds III (1891–1963); 40°49′49″N 73°56′16″W Polo Grounds II/Manhattan Field (1889–1890/1891–1948); 40°47′53″N 73°57′2″W Polo Grounds I (1876–1889)
- Owner: New York Giants
- Operator: New York Giants
- Capacity: 34,000 (1911); 55,000 (1923)
- Surface: Grass
- Field size: Left field: 279 ft (85 m); Left-center: 450 ft (137 m); Center field: 483 ft (147 m); Right-center: 449 ft (136 m); Right field: 258 ft (78 m)

Construction
- Groundbreaking: 1890
- Opened: April 19, 1890
- Renovated: June 28, 1911
- Expanded: 1923
- Closed: December 14, 1963; 62 years ago
- Demolished: April 10, 1964
- Architect: Henry B. Herts

Tenants
- New York Metropolitans (AA) (1883); New York Giants (PL) (1890); New York Giants (NL) (1891–1957); New York Giants (ALPF) (1894); New York Yankees (AL) (1913–1922); New York Mets (NL) (1962–1963); New York Brickley Giants (NFL) (1921); New York Giants (NFL) (1925–1955); Columbia Lions football (NCAA) (1900–1922); New York Nationals (ASL) (1927–1930); Fordham Rams football (NCAA) (1928–1950; 1953–1954); New York Giants (ASL) (1930–1932); New York Cubans (NNL) (1939–1950); New York Black Yankees (NNL) (1931–46); New York Bulldogs (NFL) (1949); New York Titans/Jets (AFL) (1960–1963); Gotham Bowl (NCAA) (1961)

The Polo Grounds was the name of four stadiums in Upper Manhattan, New York City, used mainly for professional baseball and American football from 1880 to 1963. The original Polo Grounds, opened in 1879 and demolished in 1889, was built for the sport of polo. Bound on the south and north by 110th and 112th streets and on the east and west by Fifth and Sixth (Lenox/Malcolm X) Avenues, just north of Central Park, it was converted to a baseball stadium when leased by the New York Metropolitans in 1880.

The third Polo Grounds, built in 1890, and renovated after a fire in 1911, was in Coogan's Hollow and was noted for its distinctive bathtub shape, with very short distances to the left and right field walls and an unusually deep center field.

The original Polo Grounds was home to the New York Metropolitans from 1880 to 1885, and the New York Giants from 1883 to 1888. The Giants played in the second Polo Grounds for part of the 1889 season and all of the 1890 season, and at the third Polo Grounds from 1891 to 1957. The Polo Grounds was also the home of the New York Yankees from 1913 to 1922 and New York Mets in their first two seasons (1962, 1963). Each version of the ballpark held at least one World Series. The final version also hosted the 1934 and 1942 All-Star Games.

In American football, the third Polo Grounds was home to the New York Brickley Giants for one game in 1921 and the New York Giants from 1925 to 1955. The New York Titans/Jets of the American Football League played at the stadium from the league's inaugural season of 1960 until 1963.

Other sporting events held at the Polo Grounds included soccer, boxing, and Gaelic football. Its final sporting event was a pro football game between the Jets and Buffalo Bills. Shea Stadium opened in 1964 and replaced the Polo Grounds as the home of the Mets and Jets. The Polo Grounds was demolished and a public housing complex, Polo Grounds Towers, was built on the site.

== Polo Grounds I ==
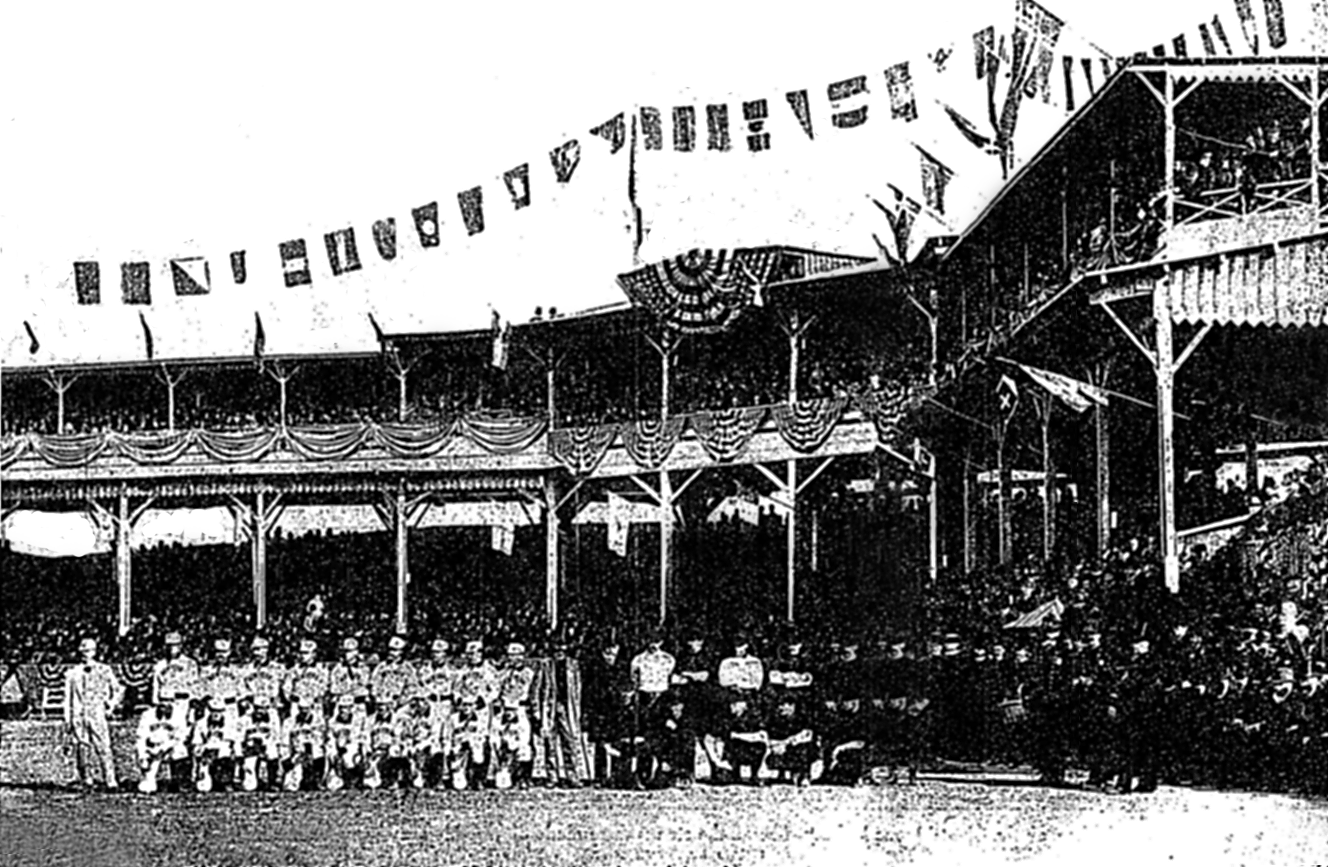
The first Polo Grounds, Opening Day, 1888

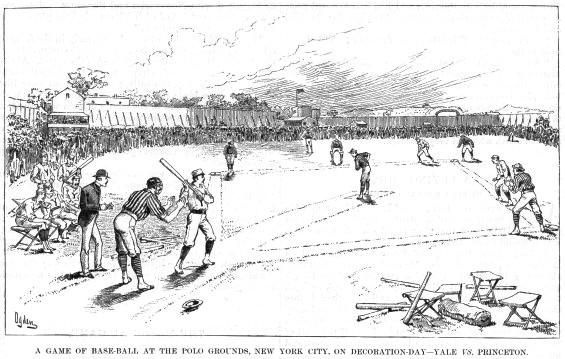
Earliest known image of Polo Grounds I, from 1882

The original Polo Grounds stood at 110th Street between Fifth Avenue and Sixth Avenue, directly across 110th Street from the northeast corner of Central Park. The venue's original purpose was for the sport of polo. Its name was initially merely descriptive, not a formal name, often rendered as "the polo grounds" in newspapers. The Metropolitans, an independent team of roughly major-league caliber, was the first professional baseball team to play there, beginning in September 1880, and remained the sole professional occupant through the 1882 season. At that time the Metropolitans' ownership had the opportunity to bring it into the National League, but elected instead to organize a new team, the New York Gothams—who soon came to be known as the Giants—mainly using players from the Metropolitans and the newly defunct Troy Trojans, and entered it in the National League, while bringing what remained of the Metropolitan club into the competing American Association. For this purpose the ownership built a second diamond and grandstand at the park, dividing it into eastern and western fields for use by the Giants and Metropolitans respectively. Polo Grounds I thus hosted its first Major League Baseball games in 1883 as the home stadium of two teams, the American Association Metropolitans and the National League Gothams. The dual-fields arrangement proved unworkable because of faulty surfacing of the western field, and after various other arrangements were tried, the Metropolitans and Giants alternated play on the eastern field in later years until the Metropolitans moved to the St. George Cricket Grounds on Staten Island in 1886.

Although the Giants would soon become the team of choice in the city, the "Mets" had a good year in 1884. They had started the season in a new facility called Metropolitan Park, which proved to be such a poor venue that they moved back to the Polo Grounds within a few weeks. Despite that bit of drama, the Mets went on to win the American Association pennant. Their good fortune ran out when they faced the Providence Grays in the World Series, in which Providence pitcher Old Hoss Radbourn pitched three consecutive shutouts against them. All three games had been staged at the Polo Grounds.

An early highlight of Giants' play at the Polo Grounds was Roger Connor's home run over the right-field wall and into 112th Street; Connor eventually held the record for career home runs that Babe Ruth would break July 8, 1921.

The original Polo Grounds was used not only for Polo and professional baseball, but often for college baseball and football as well – even by teams outside New York. The earliest known surviving image of the field is an engraving of a baseball game between Yale University and Princeton University on Decoration Day, May 30, 1882. Yale and Harvard also played their traditional Thanksgiving Day football game there on November 29, 1883, and November 24, 1887. (See Football below)

=== Demolition and forced relocation ===
New York City was in the process of extending its street grid into uptown Manhattan in 1889. Plans for an extended West 111th Street ran through the Polo Grounds. City workers are said to have shown up suddenly one day and begun cutting through the fence to lay out the new street. With the Giants having won the National League pennant the year before, as well as the World Series there was significant sentiment in the city against the move; a bill was even passed by the state legislature giving the Giants a variance which would allow the park to stand. Governor David B. Hill, who had campaigned for office on a "home rule" pledge, vetoed it on the grounds that whatever he might think of the forced destruction of the park, the will of the city government was to be respected. The loss of their park forced the Giants to look quickly for alternative grounds.

== Polo Grounds II ==
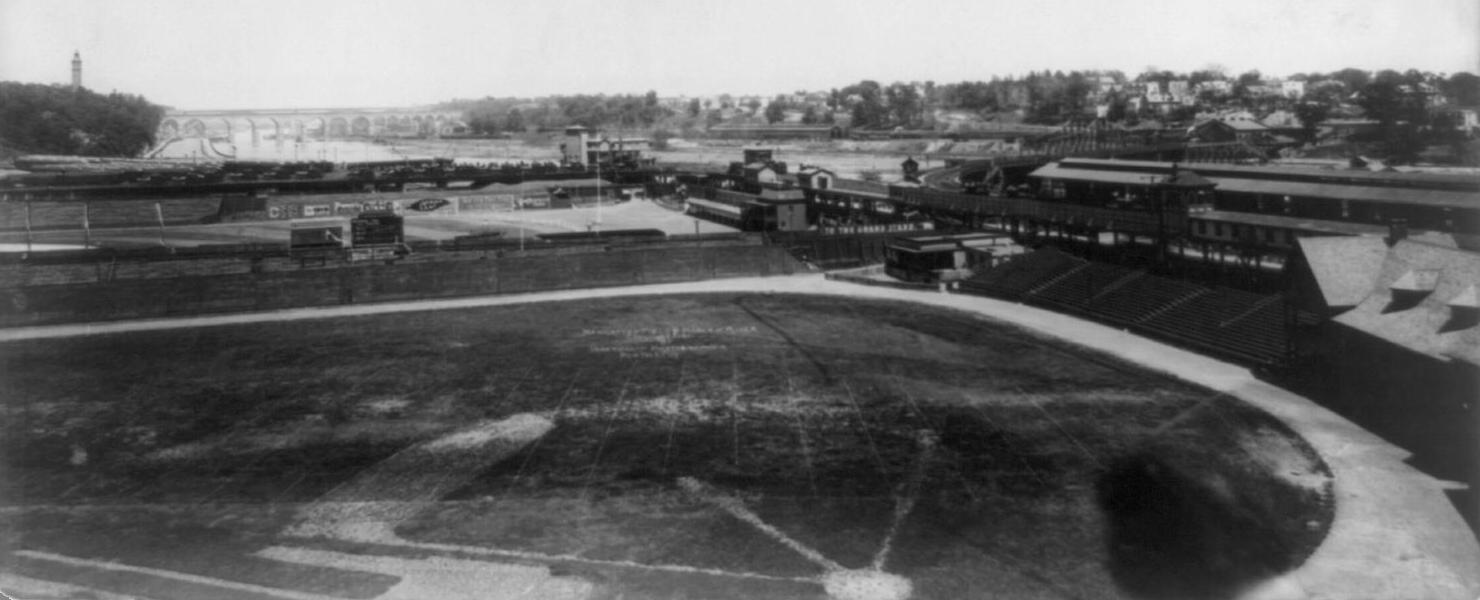
Manhattan Field c. 1901 with Polo Grounds outfield in background. High Bridge crossing the Harlem River at about 173rd Street is in the background. The bridge's center spans over the river itself were replaced by a large single span in the 1920s. The tower on the left is Highbridge Water Tower

The Giants opened the 1889 season at Oakland Park in Jersey City, New Jersey, playing their first two games there. Four days later, they moved to the St. George Cricket Grounds (where the Metropolitans had continued to play until their demise following the 1887 season).

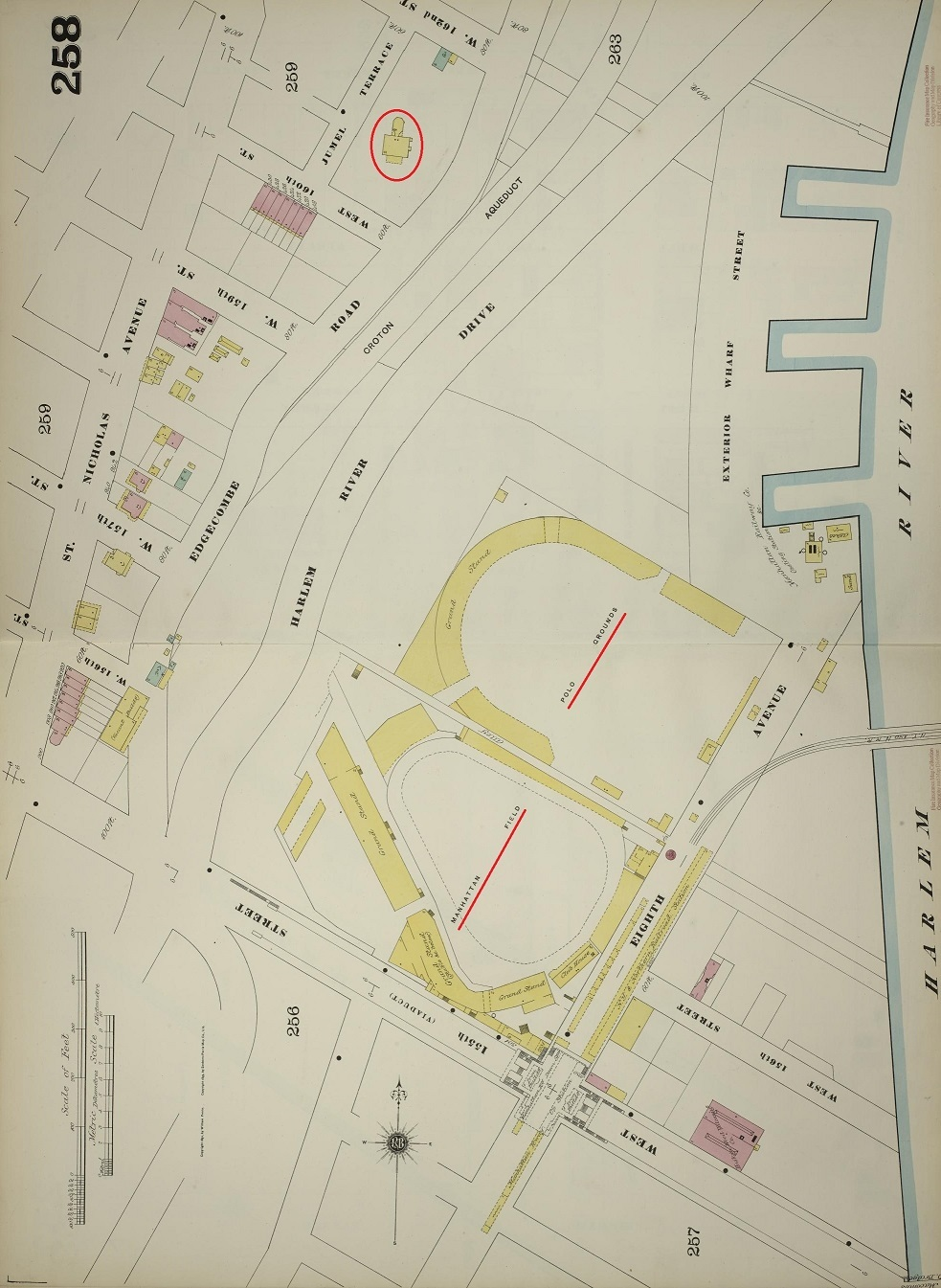
Map of the area in 1893

After closing out a homestand at the St. George Grounds on June 14, the Giants went on the road. Upon their return on July 8 they had relocated again, to a "New Polo Grounds" site within Manhattan at the far terminus of the then Ninth Avenue Elevated at 155th Street and 8th Avenue (now Frederick Douglass Boulevard). Newspaper accounts indicate that the seats from the original Polo Grounds were moved to the new Polo Grounds stands. Despite their vagabond existence during the first half of the 1889 season, the Giants began their stay at the new ballpark just 4 games behind the league-leading Boston club. They rallied to win the pennant for the second consecutive year, as well as that year's World Series against Brooklyn.

The new site was overlooked to the north and west by a steep promontory known as Coogan's Bluff. Because of its elevation, fans frequently watched games from the Bluff without buying tickets. The ballpark itself was in bottomland known as Coogan's Hollow. The grandstand had a conventional curve around the infield, but the shape of the property made the center field area actually closer than left center or right center. This was not much of an issue in the "dead ball era" of baseball. The land remained in the Coogan estate, and the Giants were renters for their entire time at Polo Grounds II, III and IV. The Brooklyn Dodgers played a pair of home series at this ballpark in late July and early August 1890.

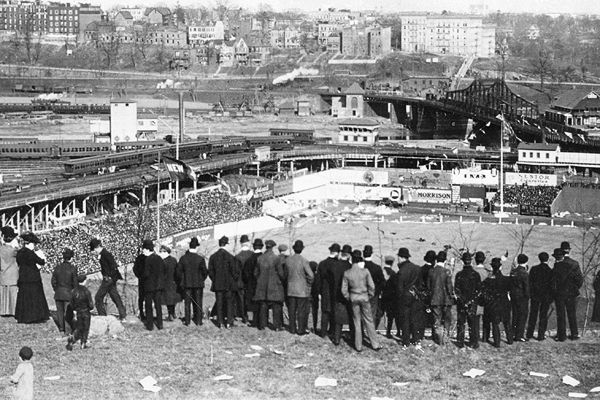
Fans on Coogan's Bluff watch the infamous Merkle's Boner game between the Giants and Cubs, September 23, 1908

After the National League version of the New York Giants moved into Polo Grounds III in 1891, Polo Grounds II was sub-leased to the Manhattan Athletic Club and was referred to ever after as Manhattan Field. It was converted for other sports such as football and track-and-field.

The New York Giants leased Manhattan Field to the Columbia University football team for $14,000 in 1899 and $15,000 in 1900.

The superstructure of Manhattan Field was demolished in 1911 following the fire that destroyed Polo Grounds III, but the site still existed as a field for 20 more years. Babe Ruth's first home run as a Yankee, on May 1, 1920, was characterized by The New York Times reporter as a "sockdolager" (i.e. a decisive blow), and was described as traveling "over the right field grand stand into Manhattan Field". Bill Jenkinson's modern research indicates the ball traveled about 500 feet (150 m) in total, after clearing the Polo Grounds double decked right field stand. Manhattan Field continued to be an occasional site for amateur sports reported in local newspapers as late as spring of 1942. In June 1948, the Giants again leased the Manhattan Field property, and had it paved over to serve as a parking lot for the Polo Grounds.

== Polo Grounds III and IV ==
=== Polo Grounds III ===
Polo Grounds III was the stadium that made the name nationally famous. Built in 1890, it initially had a completely open outfield bounded by just the outer fence, but bleachers were gradually added. By the early 1900s, some bleacher sections encroached on the field from the foul lines about halfway along left and right field. Additionally, there were a pair of "cigar box" bleachers on either side of the "batter's eye" in center field. The expansive outfield was cut down somewhat by a rope fence behind which carriages (and early automobiles) were allowed to park. By 1910, bleachers enclosed the outfield, and the carriage ropes were gone. The hodge-podge approach to the bleacher construction formed a multi-faceted outfield area. There were a couple of gaps between some of the sections, and that would prove significant in 1911.

Known as Brotherhood Park when it opened in 1890, Polo Grounds III was the home of a second New York Giants franchise in the Players' League. The latter was a creation of Major League Baseball's first union, the Brotherhood of Professional Base-Ball Players. After failing to win concessions from National League owners, the Brotherhood founded its own league in 1890. The Players' League Giants built Brotherhood Park in the northern half of Coogan's Hollow, next door to Polo Grounds II, otherwise bounded by rail yards and the bluff. Brotherhood Park hosted its first game on April 19, 1890, the same day the National League's Giants played their first home game of the season. For the full 1890 season the two editions of the Giants were neighbors. When the teams played on the same day, fans in the upper decks could watch each other's games, and home run balls hit in one park might land on the other team's playing field. After the one season the Players' League folded, and the Brotherhood's members went back to the National League. The National League Giants then moved out of Polo Grounds II and into Brotherhood Park, which was larger. They took their stadium's name with them once again, turning Brotherhood Park into the new-new Polo Grounds. Between Polo Grounds II and III-IV, they would remain in Coogan's Hollow for 69 seasons.

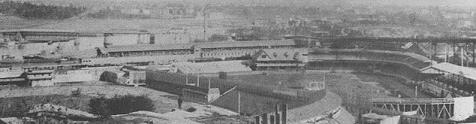
Polo Grounds (III) (left) and Manhattan Field (aka Polo Grounds II) (right) c.1900
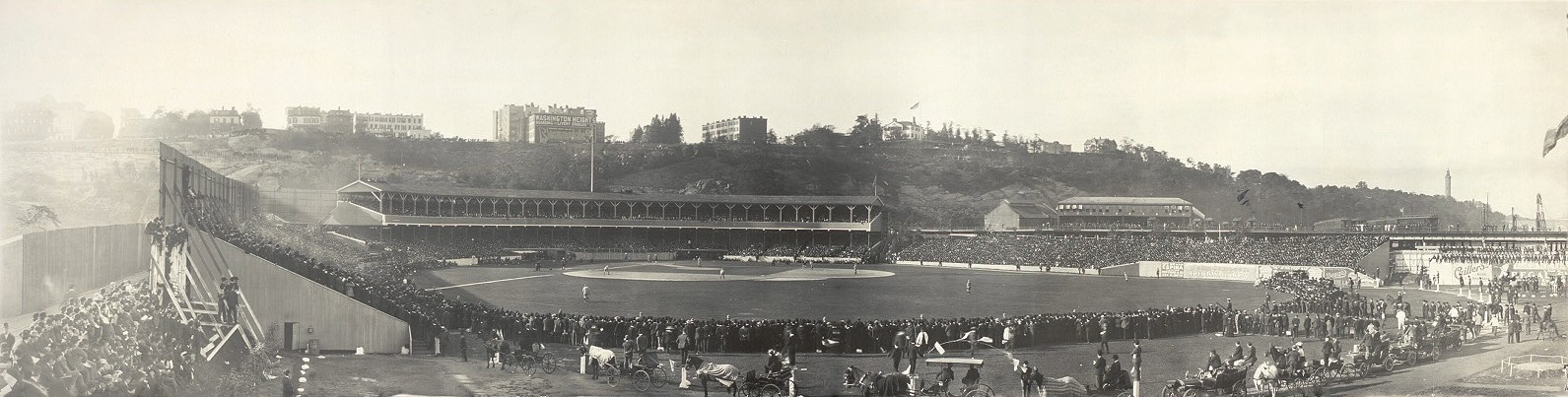
Polo Grounds c.1905. The Morris-Jumel Mansion is on the upper right on top of Coogan's Bluff

=== Fire and reconstruction as Polo Grounds IV ===
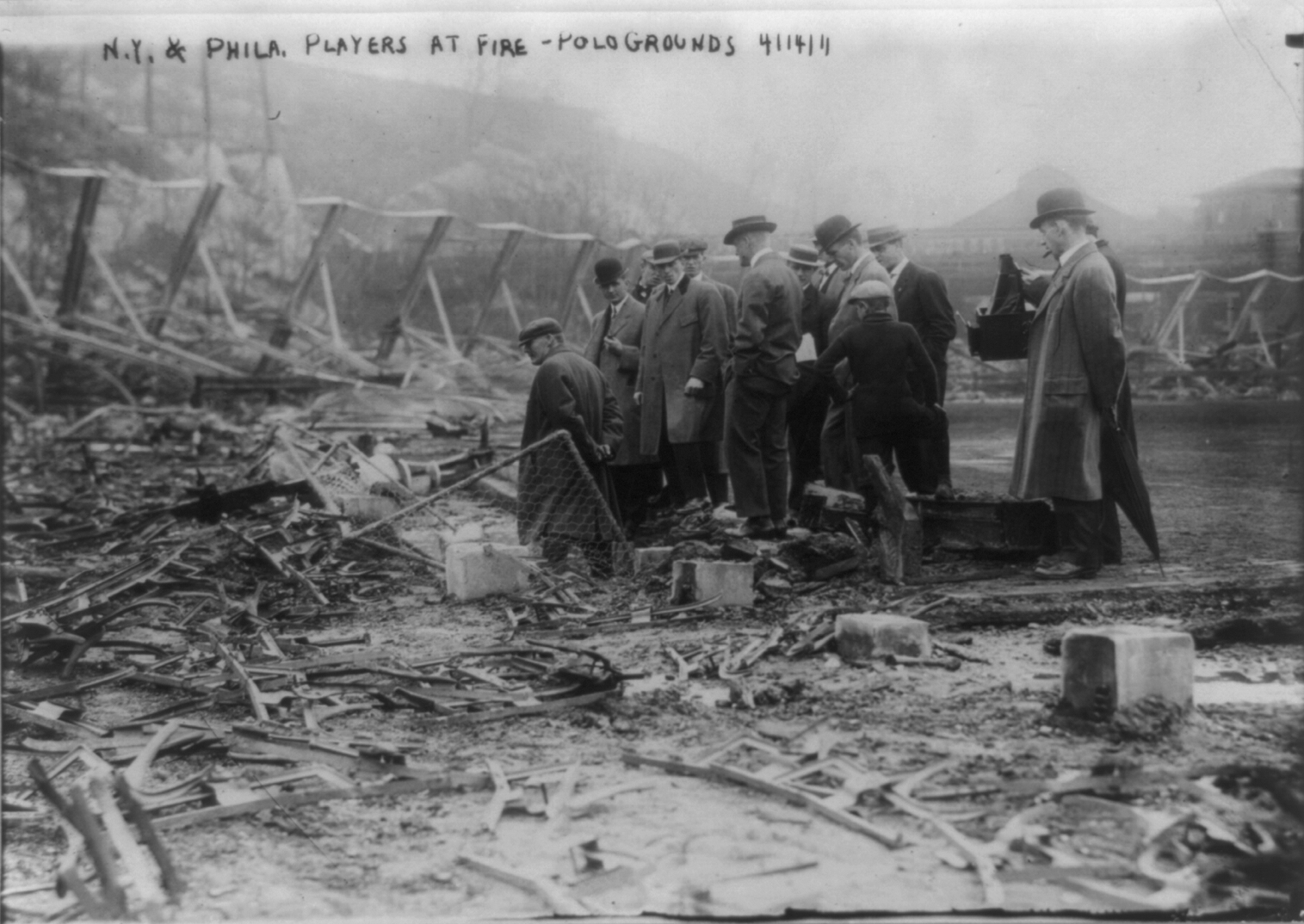
Giants players inspecting the burned ruins at the Polo Grounds, April 14, 1911

In the very early morning hours of Friday, April 14, 1911, a fire of uncertain origin swept through the stadium's horseshoe-shaped grandstand, consuming wood and leaving only steel uprights in place. The gaps between some sections of the stands saved a good portion of the outfield seating and the clubhouse from destruction. Giants owner John T. Brush decided to rebuild the Polo Grounds with concrete and steel, renting Hilltop Park from the Highlanders during reconstruction.

Progress was sufficient to allow the stadium to reopen just 2½ months later, June 28, 1911, the date some baseball guides date the structure. As configured, it was the ninth concrete-and-steel stadium in the Majors and fourth in the National League. Unfinished seating areas were rebuilt during the season while the games went on. The new structure stretched in roughly the same semicircle from the left field corner around home plate to the right field corner as prior but was extended into deep right-center field. The surviving wooden bleachers were retained basically as is, with gaps remaining on each side between the new fireproof construction.

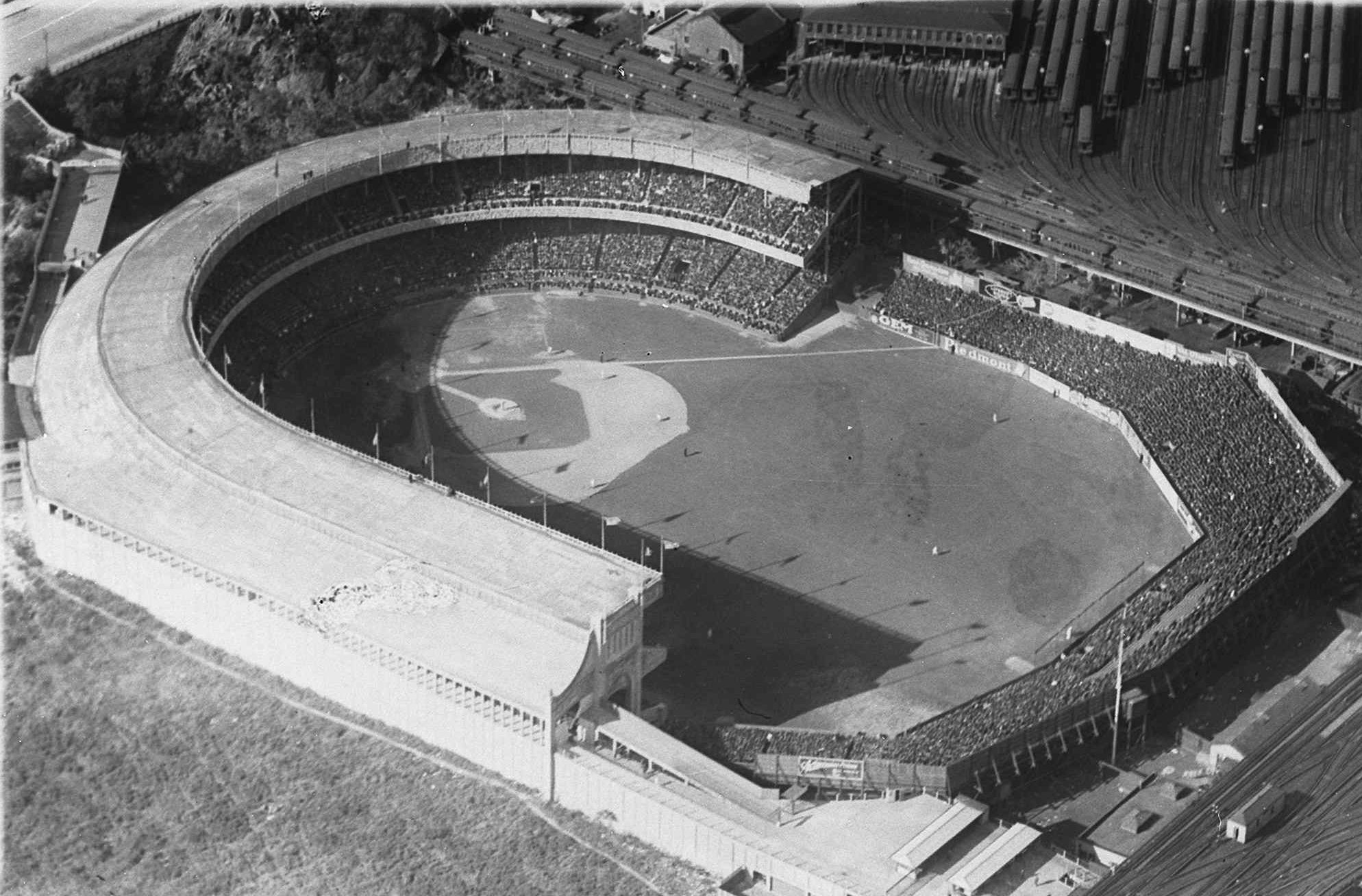
Aerial view of the Polo Grounds in 1921, highlighting its U- or bathtub shape.

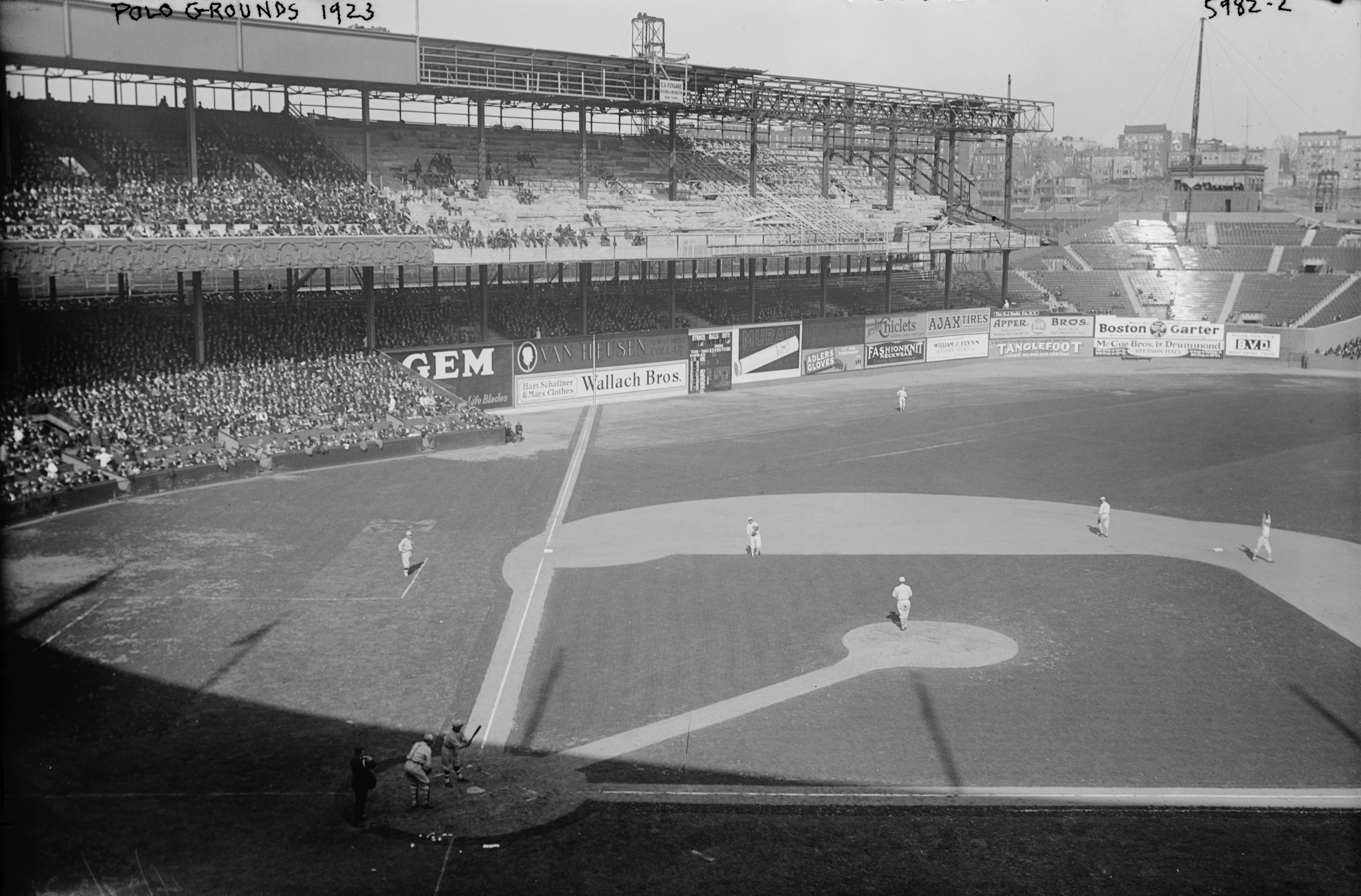
Polo Grounds expansion in progress during the 1923 season.

The Giants rose from the ashes along with their ballpark, winning the National League pennant in 1911 (as they also would in 1912 and 1913). As evidenced from the World Series programs, the team renamed the new structure Brush Stadium in honor of their then-owner John T. Brush, but the name did not stick, and by the late 1910s it was passé. The remaining old bleachers were demolished during the 1923 season when the permanent double-deck was extended around most of the rest of the field and new bleachers and clubhouse were constructed across center field. This construction gave the stadium its familiar horseshoe or bathtub style shape, as well as a new nickname, "The Bathtub".

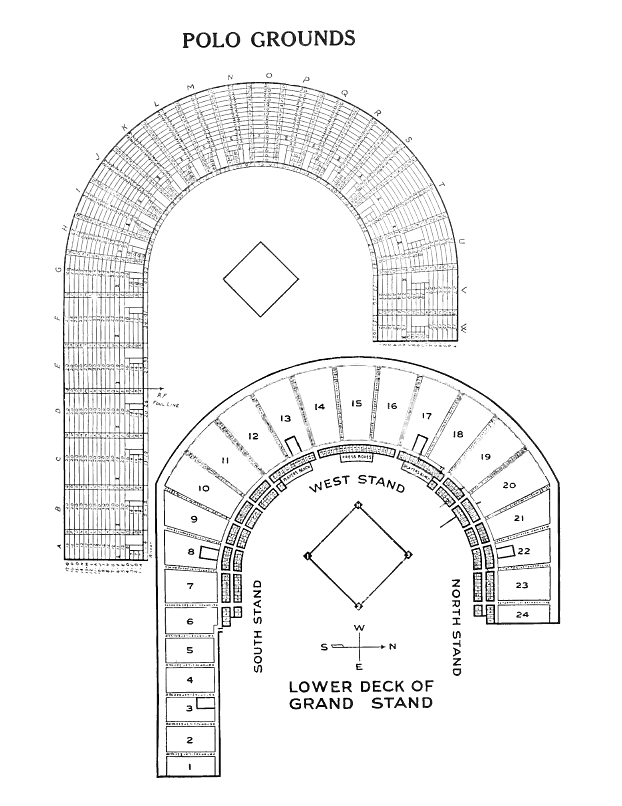
Seating diagram of the Polo Grounds, circa 1923

This version of the ballpark had its share of quirks. The "unofficial" distances (never marked on the wall) down the left and right field lines were 279 and 258 feet (85 and 79 m) respectively, but there was a 21-foot (6.4 m) overhang in left field, which often intercepted fly balls that would otherwise have been catchable and turned them into home runs. Contrasting with the short distances down the foul lines were the 450-foot distances to deepest left and right center (the gaps); the base of the straightaway centerfield clubhouse stood 483 feet from home plate, up a 58-foot runway from the grandstand corners on either side of the clubhouse (these corners were themselves 425 feet (130 m) from home plate). The famous photo of The catch made by Willie Mays in the 1954 World Series against Vic Wertz of the Cleveland Indians occurred immediately in front of the "batter's eye", a metal screen atop the grandstand wall directly to the right of the centerfield runway. It would have been a home run in several other ballparks of the time as well as in most of today's modern ballparks. The bullpens were actually in play, in the left and right center field gaps. The outfield sloped downward from the infield, and people in the dugouts often could only see the top half of the outfielders.

Field layout as of 1922, compared with Yankee Stadium

The New York Yankees sublet the Polo Grounds from the Giants during 1913–1922 after their lease on Hilltop Park expired. After the 1922 season, the Yankees built Yankee Stadium directly across the Harlem River from the Polo Grounds, which spurred the Giants to expand their park to reach a comparable seating capacity to stay competitive. Since nearly all the new seating was in the outfield, Yankee Stadium still had more desirable seats than did the Polo Grounds for watching baseball. However, the Polo Grounds became better suited for football due to the new seating placement.

The Giants' first night game at the stadium was played on May 24, 1940.

The Polo Grounds was the site of one of the most iconic moments in baseball history – the historic "Shot Heard 'Round the World" walk-off home run on October 3, 1951, that decided the hard-fought National League pennant playoff series between the Giants and their cross-town rivals, the Brooklyn Dodgers.

=== Deaths at the Polo Grounds ===
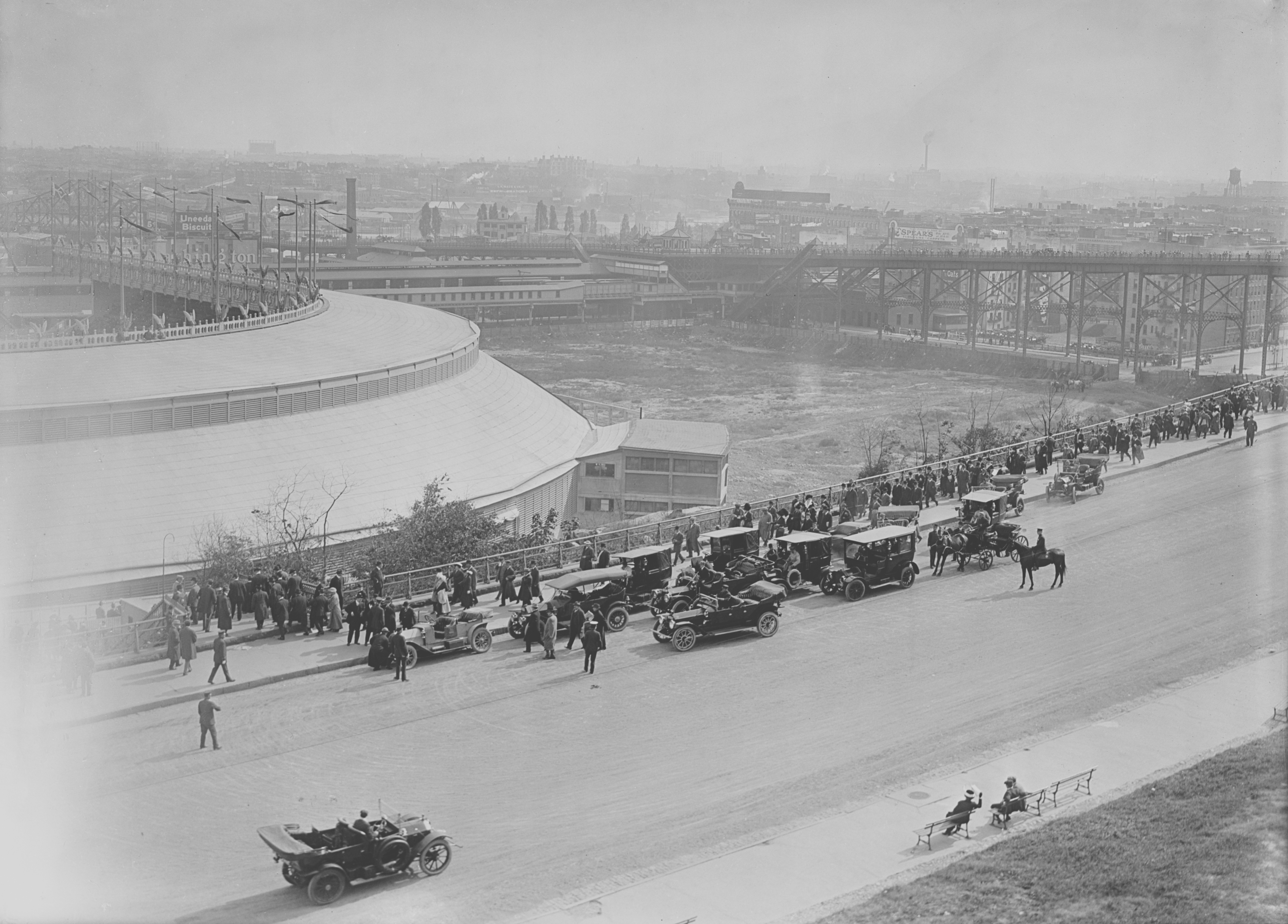
Exterior of the Polo Grounds with Harlem River Speedway in foreground, circa 1915. Note vacant lot, site of Manhattan Field.

On August 16, 1920, Cleveland Indians shortstop Ray Chapman was hit in the head by a pitch thrown by the Yankees' Carl Mays. At the time, batters did not wear helmets. Chapman died 12 hours after he was hit, at 4:30 a.m. on August 17. He remains the only player to die from an injury sustained in a Major League Baseball game.

On July 4, 1950, Bernard Doyle, a resident of Fairview, New Jersey, in his 50s, originally from Dublin, Ireland, was struck and killed by a stray bullet while in his seat at the Polo Grounds. Doyle had brought a neighbor's son with him to see a doubleheader between the Dodgers and the Giants. Doyle was killed about an hour prior to the start of the first game. A 14-year-old boy later confessed to having shot a .45 caliber pistol into the air from his rooftop at 515 Edgecombe Avenue, located 1,120 feet (340 m) from where Doyle was seated.

=== Giants' final years ===
The Polo Grounds' end was somewhat anticlimactic, especially compared to other "Jewel Box" parks.

Part of the problem was that the stadium was not well maintained from the late 1940s onward: while the baseball Giants owned the stadium, the Coogan heirs still owned the parcel of land on which it stood, while the neighborhood around the stadium had begun to go to seed in the late 1940s. These, along with other factors, combined to restrict ticket sales, even when the Giants were playing well.

In 1954, for example, the baseball Giants drew only 1.1 million fans (compared to over two million for the Milwaukee Braves) despite winning the World Series.

The football Giants left for Yankee Stadium across the Harlem River following the 1955 NFL season, and the baseball Giants' disastrous 1956 season – most of which they spent in last place before a late-season surge moved them up to sixth – caused a further decline on ticket sales. The Giants' 1956 attendance was less than half of that for the Giants' World Series-winning 1954 season, and also ranked last in Major League Baseball.

Along with the departure of the football Giants and the consequential loss of their rent, this collapse of the baseball Giants' gate financially devastated franchise owner Horace Stoneham, who was not nearly as wealthy as his fellow owners – the Giants were his sole source of income. To make matters worse, Stoneham was left with no money for stadium upkeep, and he was forced to lay off the stadium's maintenance staff in order to stay afloat.

The stadium also had very little parking; its final form had opened two years after the Model T was introduced. Due to the manner in which the stadium was designed, fans had to pour onto the field to exit via the center field gates, making for a problematic situation whenever attendance was anywhere near capacity.

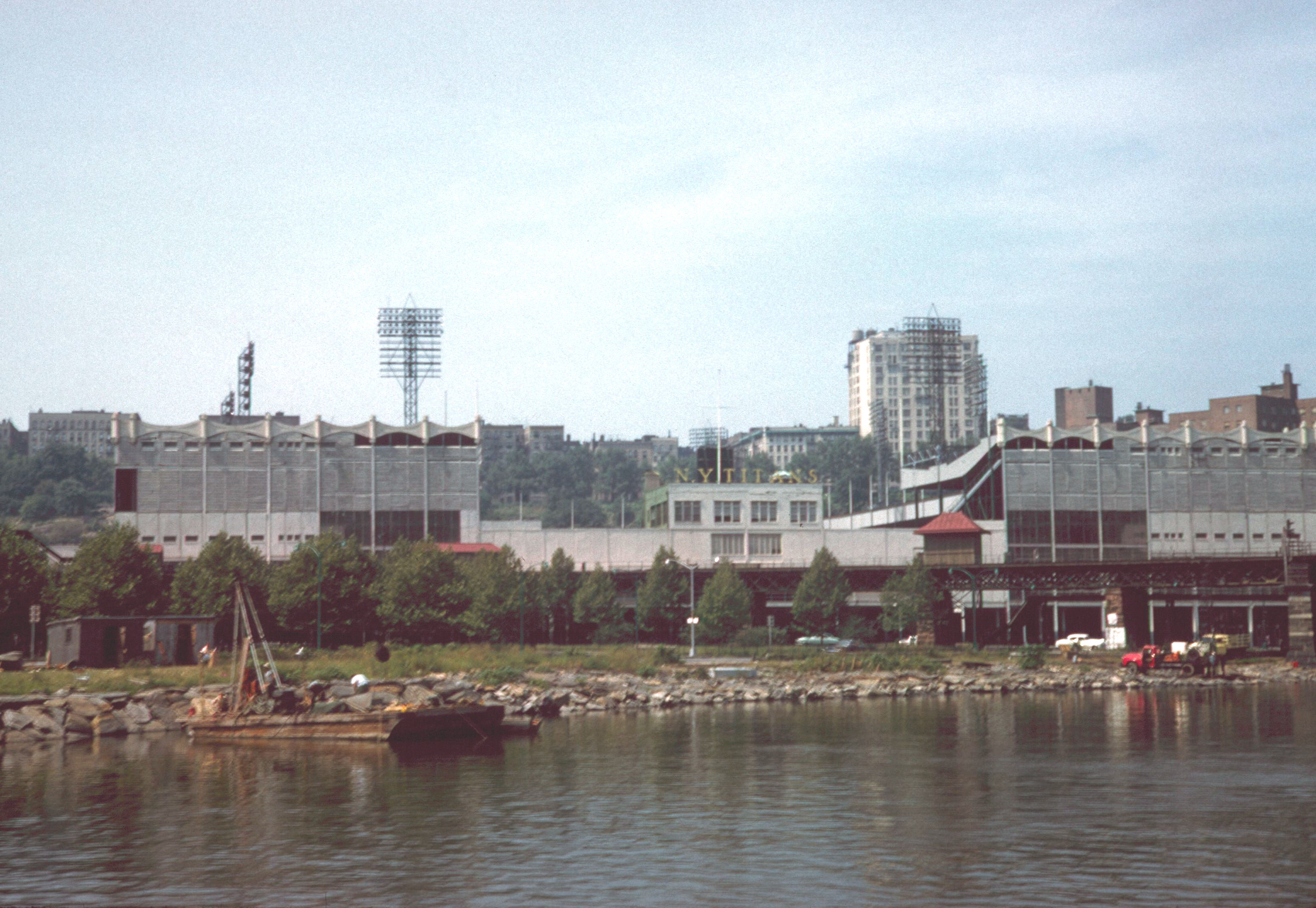
The Polo Grounds in 1961, seen from the Harlem River.

Frustrated with the Polo Grounds being obsolete and dilapidated, and with no maintenance staff or prospect of the stadium being renovated, Stoneham seriously considered having the Giants become tenants of the Yankees in the Bronx, or moving to a proposed stadium that would have been owned by the city.

After both of those plans fizzled, the Giants announced on August 19, 1957, that after 74 years of professional baseball in New York, they would relocate to San Francisco, California at the end of the season, following their long-time rivals Dodgers to the West Coast. The Giants had won five World Series titles in the Polo Grounds.

=== The final years of the Polo Grounds ===
The ballpark then sat largely vacant for nearly three years, until the newly formed Titans of New York (present-day New York Jets) began play in 1960, followed by the newly formed Mets in 1962, using the Polo Grounds as an interim home while Shea Stadium was being built. As a 1962 baseball magazine noted, "The Mets will have to play in the Polo Grounds, hardly the last word in 20th Century stadia."

In 1961, the city of New York decided to claim the land under eminent domain, for the purpose of condemning the stadium and building a high-rise housing project on the site. The Coogan family, which still owned the property, fought this effort until it was finally settled in the city's favor in 1967.

On September 18, 1963, 1,752 fans went to see the New York Mets play their last game at the Polo Grounds against the Philadelphia Phillies with a 5–1 Philadelphia win. The game's highlights were later shown on Universal-International Newsreel. On October 12, the Polo Grounds played host to one last exhibition contest, as Latin American All-Stars of the National League, managed by Roberto Clemente and behind the pitching of Juan Marichal and Al McBean, defeated Hector Lopez's AL Stars, 5–2.

The final sporting event played at the Polo Grounds was on December 14, 1963, when the now renamed AFL team New York Jets lost to the Buffalo Bills 19–10.

In the 1992 book The Gospel According to Casey, by Ira Berkow and Jim Kaplan, it is reported (p. 62) that in 1963, Mets manager Casey Stengel, who had bittersweet memories of his playing days at the Polo Grounds, had this to say during a rough outing to pitcher Tracy Stallard, whose greatest claim to fame had been giving up Roger Maris' 61st homer in 1961: "At the end of this season, they're gonna tear this joint down. The way you're pitchin', the right field section will be gone already!"

=== Demolition ===
The final iteration of the Polo Grounds was demolished in 1964, beginning on April 10 with a wrecking ball bomb painted to look like a baseball, the same one that had been used four years earlier on Ebbets Field.

The wrecking crew wore Giants jerseys and tipped their hard hats to the historic stadium as they began dismantling it, with a crew of 60 workers taking 4½ months to level the stadium. Stephen McNair, a Dodger fan, grabbed a sledge hammer as easily as Johnny Mize picked up a bat, marked off the left field fence beneath Section 33, and vowed, "I'm going to take that place down myself." It was the fence over which Bobby Thomson hit the home run that kept the Dodgers out of the World Series in 1951 and put the Giants in.

The foreman on the job, Abe Gach, shouted, "No, you don't. Be gentle over there. History was made there."

The Indians' bus passed the site in the midst of demolition while Cleveland was playing the Yankees: Dick Donovan, eyeing the rubble, remarked, "Boy, they must have had a helluva game there last night."

The site is now home to the Polo Grounds Towers, a public housing project opened in 1968, and managed by the New York City Housing Authority.

== Sports other than baseball ==
=== Football ===
The various incarnations of the Polo Grounds were well-suited for football, and hundreds of football games were played there over the years.

The first professional football game played in New York City was played at the Polo Grounds on December 4, 1920. The game featured the Buffalo All-Americans against the Canton Bulldogs in the first year of the American Professional Football Association. The Buffalo All-Americans won the game, 7–3. Some argue that the Buffalo All-Americans are tied with the Akron Pros for the first championship of the American Professional Football Association, which soon came to be known as the National Football League. In 1921 the NFL's New York Brickley Giants played the final game of their 1921 season against the Cleveland Indians at the Polo Grounds. The game ended in a 17–0 Giants loss. Shortly afterwards, the team folded. The Brickley Giants were originally formed with the intent of competing in 1919, and having all of their home games held at the Polo Grounds. However, after the team's first practice, the 1919 schedule, that began with an opening day game against the Massillon Tigers, was scratched because of conflict with New York's blue laws. In 1919, the city allowed professional baseball on Sunday and the Giants thought the law would also apply to football. However, it was ruled that professional football was still outlawed on Sundays, so the team disbanded until 1921.

Other than the name, there is no relation between the Brickley Giants and the modern New York Giants franchise.

Both the New York Giants of the National Football League and the New York Jets (then known as the Titans of New York) of the American Football League used the Polo Grounds as their home field before moving on to other sites. The Giants moved initially to Yankee Stadium in 1956 while the Jets, founded in 1960, followed the New York Mets to Shea Stadium in 1964. The football Giants hosted the 1934, 1938, 1944, and 1946 NFL Championship Games at the Polo Grounds, while the 1936 NFL Championship Game, originally scheduled for Fenway Park, was moved to the Polo Grounds by mutual agreement of Boston Redskins franchise owner George Preston Marshall, the Green Bay Packers, and the NFL due to low ticket sales in Boston; the Redskins would relocate to Washington in 1937.

==== College football ====
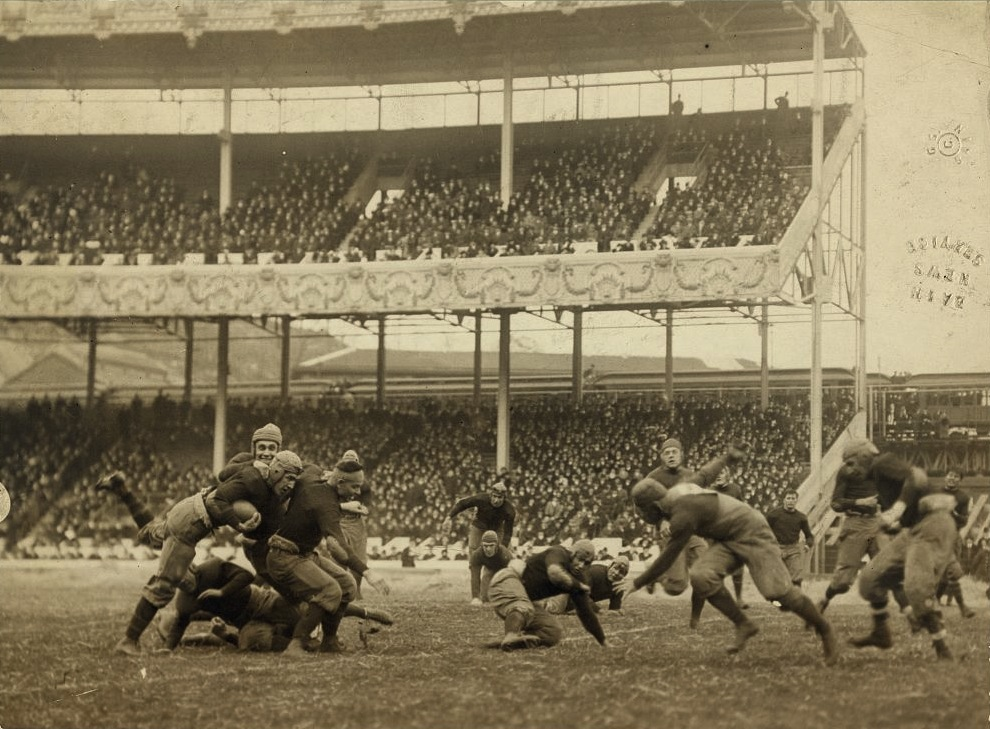
1916 Army–Navy Game at the Polo Grounds.

Columbia University and Yale University, two of American football's oldest teams, played football in the original 110th Street Polo Grounds in the 19th century, for some games which were expected to draw large crowds, including the Thanksgiving contests in 1883 and 1887. (See also List of Harvard-Yale football games).

The grounds were also used for many games by New York-area college football teams such as Fordham and Army. An upset victory by the visiting University of Notre Dame over Army in 1924 led to Grantland Rice's famous article about the Irish backfield, which he called "The Four Horsemen". The field was also the site of several Army–Navy Games in the 1910s and 1920s.

=== Soccer ===
The Polo Grounds held its fair share of international soccer matches as well over the years. In 1926, Hakoah, an all-Jewish side from Vienna, Austria, "drew the largest crowds ever to watch soccer in America up to that time: three successive games drew 25,000, 30,000, and 36,000 spectators. The highlight of the tour was a May 1, 1926 exhibition game between Hakoah and an American Soccer League all-New York team which drew 46,000 fans to the Polo Grounds in New York." (The ASL team won 3–0.)

On 1927, Club Nacional de Football played three matches of its tour of North America. They played Flooring Indiana, Brooklyn Wanderers and an American Soccer League all-star team.

The first soccer played at the Polo Grounds was in 1894 when the owners of several major league baseball clubs formed the American League of Professional Football to fill their stadiums during baseball's off-season. Six famous baseball franchises of the era formed association football sections and fans were told that many would be fielding their baseball stars on the football field in the opening season. The New York Giants soccer team took the field in all-white uniforms with black socks and played six games before the threat of a rival baseball league being formed diverted the owners' attention away from their new venture and caused it to be suspended mid-season. The Giants lay third in the league after six games with two victories, having played their matches in midweek in front of attendances in the high hundreds paying 25 cents a game. Although the owners remained positive about the venture and wanted to run it again the following season, this never happened and the Giants' soccer team was no more.

On May 19, 1935, the Scotland national team toured the United States, and in their first game played against an ASL All-Star squad which was unofficially representing the United States. Scotland won 5–1 in front of 25,000 people at the Polo Grounds. In 1939, the Scots returned to America for another tour, and played at the Polo Grounds twice. In their first game at the Polo Grounds on May 21, 1939, Scotland tied the Eastern USA All-Stars 1–1 in front of 25,072 fans. In their second game at the Polo Grounds on June 18, 1939, Scotland beat the American League Stars 4–2.

Following World War II, on September 26, 1948, the USA beat Israel 3–1 in their first ever game since independence before 25,000 fans at the Polo Grounds. On June 9, 1950, a crowd of 21,000 fans came to the Polo Grounds to watch an 'International Dream Double Header'. Beşiktaş J.K. of Turkey defeated the American Soccer League All-Stars 3–1, and then Manchester United defeated Jönköping (the top amateur team in Sweden) 4–0. On May 17, 1960, Birmingham City of England played Third Lanark of Scotland and lost 4–1 at the Polo Grounds in New York City. On August 6 of the same year, 25,440 patrons showed up at the Polo Grounds to watch the inaugural International Soccer League final which saw Bangu of Brazil edge out Kilmarnock FC of Scotland 2–0. Bangu's six games on Polo Ground had a total attendance of 104,274. The following year, 1961, may have been the last year documented that soccer was played at the Polo Grounds. The second edition of the International Soccer League held most of its game at the Polo Grounds, with a few games held in Montreal. On July 16, 1961 Shamrock Rovers beat Red Star Belgrade 5–1, on August 9, Dukla Prague beat Everton 7–0, and four days later on August 13, Dukla Prague beat Everton again 2–0, thus winning the Dwight D. Eisenhower Trophy. The combined attendance for both games at the Polo Grounds was 31,627. In domestic league soccer, the Polo Grounds was the home to the New York Nationals of the American Soccer League in 1928.

=== Gaelic football ===
The New York GAA occasionally played major Gaelic games matches in the Polo Grounds. In Gaelic football, the 1947 All-Ireland final between Cavan and Kerry was held at the Polo Grounds on September 14 of that year. The only time an All-Ireland Senior Final has been played outside Ireland, it was the Gaelic Athletic Association (GAA)'s commemoration of "Black '47", the worst year of the Great Famine. New York was chosen as a center for Irish Americans, many descended from Famine exiles. Cavan emerged victorious in the game itself, fondly remembered for Radio Éireann commentator Michael O'Hehir's successful pleas for the broadcast line to be extended as the game had run late. The last Gaelic games match at the Polo Grounds was on June 1, 1958, when another Cavan side beat New York in Gaelic football.

=== Boxing ===
The Polo Grounds was the site of many famous boxing matches. These included the legendary 1923 heavyweight championship bout between Jack Dempsey and Luis Ángel Firpo, Harry Greb's defense of the middleweight championship title against reigning World Welterweight Champion Mickey Walker in July 1925, and Billy Conn's near-upset over heavyweight champion Joe Louis in June 1941. It was the venue for the championship rematch between Randolph Turpin and Sugar Ray Robinson September 12, 1951, where Robinson avenged his loss in Britain and won back the title. It was also the venue for the rematch between World Heavyweight Champion Ingemar Johansson and former champion Floyd Patterson on June 20, 1960. In what turned out to be the last major boxing match at the Polo Grounds, Patterson became the first heavyweight boxer to regain the championship over the Swedish-born Johansson, who almost one year to the day took the crown from Patterson at Yankee Stadium.

=== Motorsports ===
The Polo Grounds were the site of three different oval tracks. The first track, a ¼ mile dirt oval, was used for midget racing in 1940 and 1941. The second, a 1/5 mile board track, was used briefly in 1948. The final track, a ¼ mile paved oval, was used for stock car racing in 1958 and 1959, after the Giants moved to San Francisco.

== Open-air concert ==
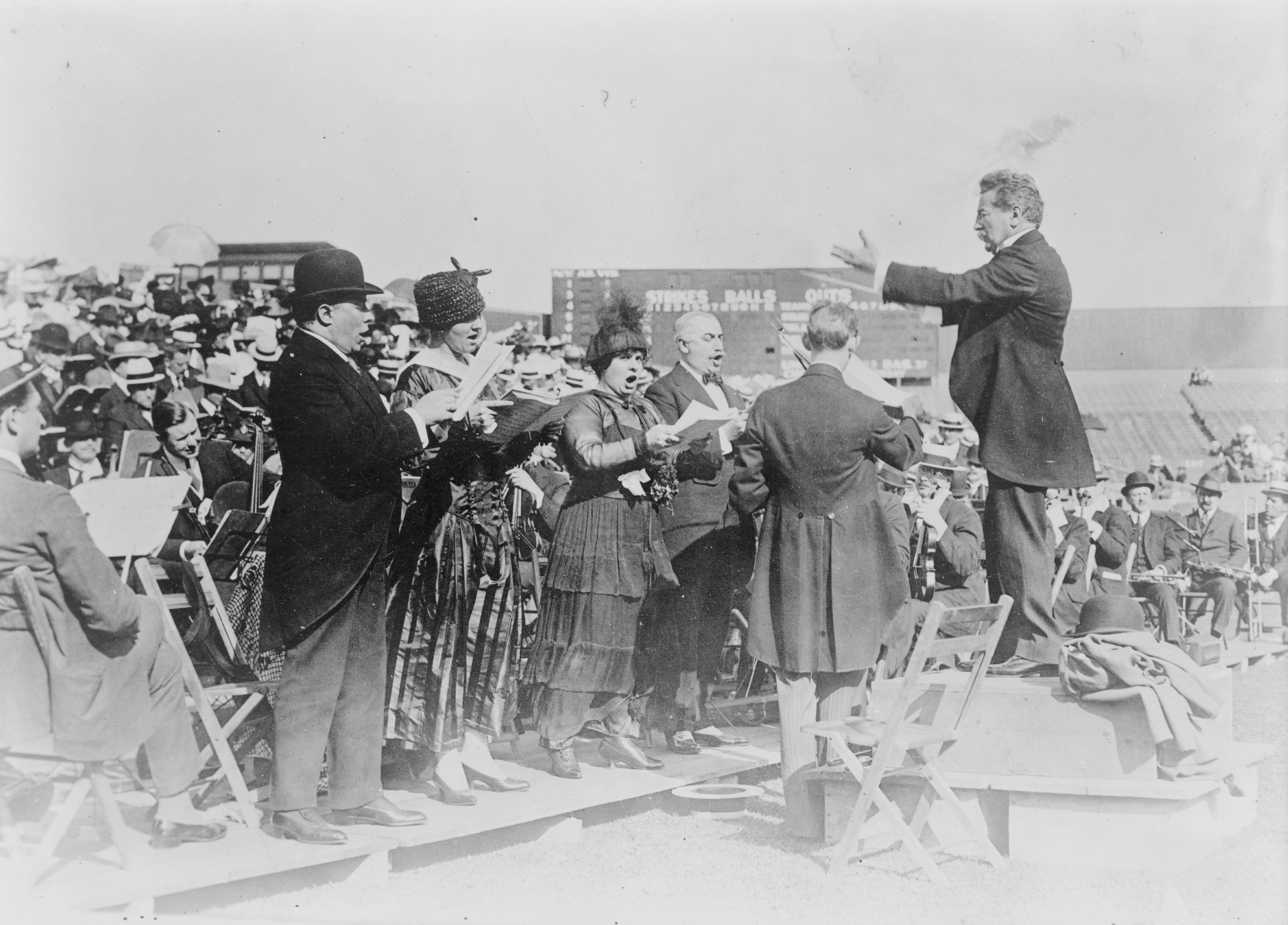
The performance of Verdi's Requiem at the Polo Grounds in 1916

A performance of Verdi's Requiem took place at the Polo Grounds on June 4, 1916, presented by the National Open Air Festival Society. It was given by a chorus of 1,200 singers (chorus master, Arnaldo Conti), selected from among the leading choral societies of New York; and an augmented New York Philharmonic Orchestra of 120 players. The soloists were Maria Gay, Louise Homer (under the assumed name of 'Lucile Lawrence'), Giovanni Zenatello (Gay's partner) and Leon Rothier, and the performance was conducted by Louis Koemmenich.

== Features for baseball ==
=== Center field ===
Willie Mays, The Catch and the 483 sign in 1954

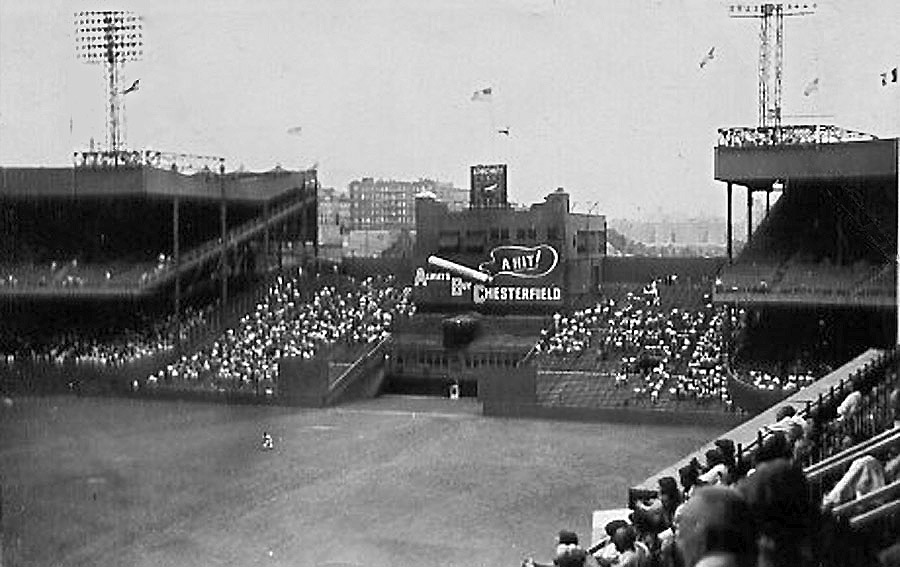
Center field in the 1950s, with famous Chesterfield cigarettes advertisement visible above the clubhouse

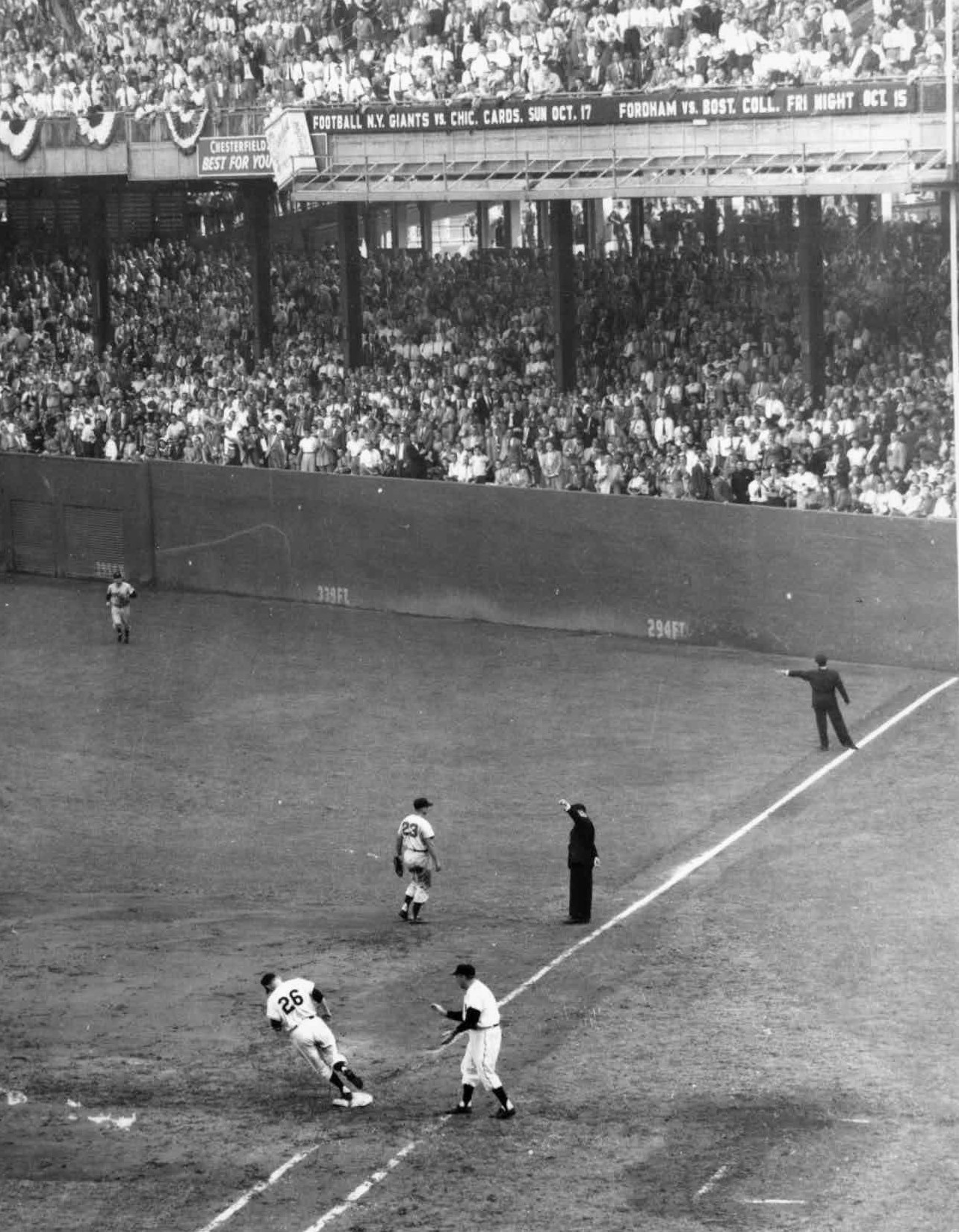
Dusty Rhodes rounding first after hitting a home run over the short right field fence (rear) in the second game of the 1954 World Series

One of the oddest features at the Polo Grounds were the deep dimensions in straight away center field. The wall was so far away from home plate, at 483 feet (147 m), that no batter ever hit home runs over it. Before its 1923 reconstruction, only Babe Ruth ever reached the centerfield stands; after 1923 only five players would reach the distant centerfield bleachers. The entire 60-foot (18 m) wall in dead center field was considered in play, as were the clubhouse windows on the in-play side of the wall. The ground rules of the Polo Grounds were set up so that if a ball went through an open window in the clubhouse, it was a ground rule double, rather than a home run. Since no ball ever reached that area in the life of the stadium, that rule was never tested.

In Game 1 of the 1954 World Series, Giants outfielder Willie Mays made a sensational catch of a fly ball hit by the Cleveland Indians' Vic Wertz into deep center field, a catch which, in the words of NBC television sports announcer Jack Brickhouse, "must have looked like an optical illusion to a lot of people", and which turned the tide of that Series in the Giants' favor.

On October 2, 1936, in Game 2 of the 1936 World Series, Yankees centerfielder Joe DiMaggio made a similar, though far less crucial, catch (his team being ahead 18–4) for the final out of the game. The Giants' Hank Leiber hit a long fly ball to deep center field that DiMaggio caught in the runway, perhaps between 430 and 440 feet (131 and 134 meters) from the plate, and his momentum carried him partway up the clubhouse steps. He then stopped and turned around, as the crowd stood and acknowledged the departure of Franklin D. Roosevelt, who was in attendance that day.

Babe Ruth hit many of his early signature blasts at the Polo Grounds, reaching the center field seats on several occasions. His longest blast at the grounds, over the right-center upper deck in 1921, was estimated at over 550 feet. He also hit several centerfield home runs at other ballparks which exceeded 500 feet. Had Ruth played regularly in the remodeled Polo Grounds, theoretically he would have been capable of hitting the clubhouse if conditions were right. Neither he nor anyone else ever did, but a few came close.

After the 1923 remodeling, only five players ever hit a home run into the center field stands:

- Schoolboy Rowe, while taking batting practice before a pre-season exhibition game on April 8, 1933.
- Luke Easter in a Negro leagues game on July 18, 1948.
- Joe Adcock on April 29, 1953.
- Hank Aaron and Lou Brock on consecutive days (June 17 and 18) in 1962.

=== Right field ===
The deep center field was complemented by the short right-field fence. Its foul pole was 258 feet (79 m) from home, one of the shortest ever used in the major leagues. Since the early 20th century, home runs that just cleared a field's shortest fence had been known as "Chinese home runs", from a stereotype of Chinese immigrant workers as doing the bare minimum required for the low wages they received for menial labor. Within baseball, by the 1940s those home runs were largely associated with the short right-field fence at the Polo Grounds. The 511 career homers hit by Giants outfielder Mel Ott, whose physique and batting technique were not those associated with power hitting, have often been downplayed because a significant number were hit to right at home, a criticism he often responded to by asking why few other hitters in the league were making that hit if it were so easy.

Bobby Thomson's "Shot Heard 'Round the World" that won the 1951 National League pennant for the Giants was hit over the left field fence. The walk-off three-run shot by Dusty Rhodes, batting for Monte Irvin in the 10th inning of Game 1 of the 1954 Series, after Mays' catch had kept the Giants tied. It just barely cleared the fence, above the outstretched glove of the leaping outfielder Dave Pope, leading Al López, manager of the heavily favored Indians, to attribute the Giants' victory in the Series opener to the ballpark's unusual dimensions.

=== Bullpens ===
Both the home and visitors' bullpens resided on the outfield warning track, situated, respectively, in the right-center and left-center power alleys, each roughly 450 feet from home plate. Anyone seated on the bench was offered some measure of protection from the elements by what has been variously described as an awning, a canopy, or simply the top of the bullpen, as Pittsburgh sportswriter Les Biederman put it when, two years after the ballpark's demolition, he reminded readers that this had been the landing spot for Roberto Clemente's first major league home run.

=== John T. Brush Stairway ===
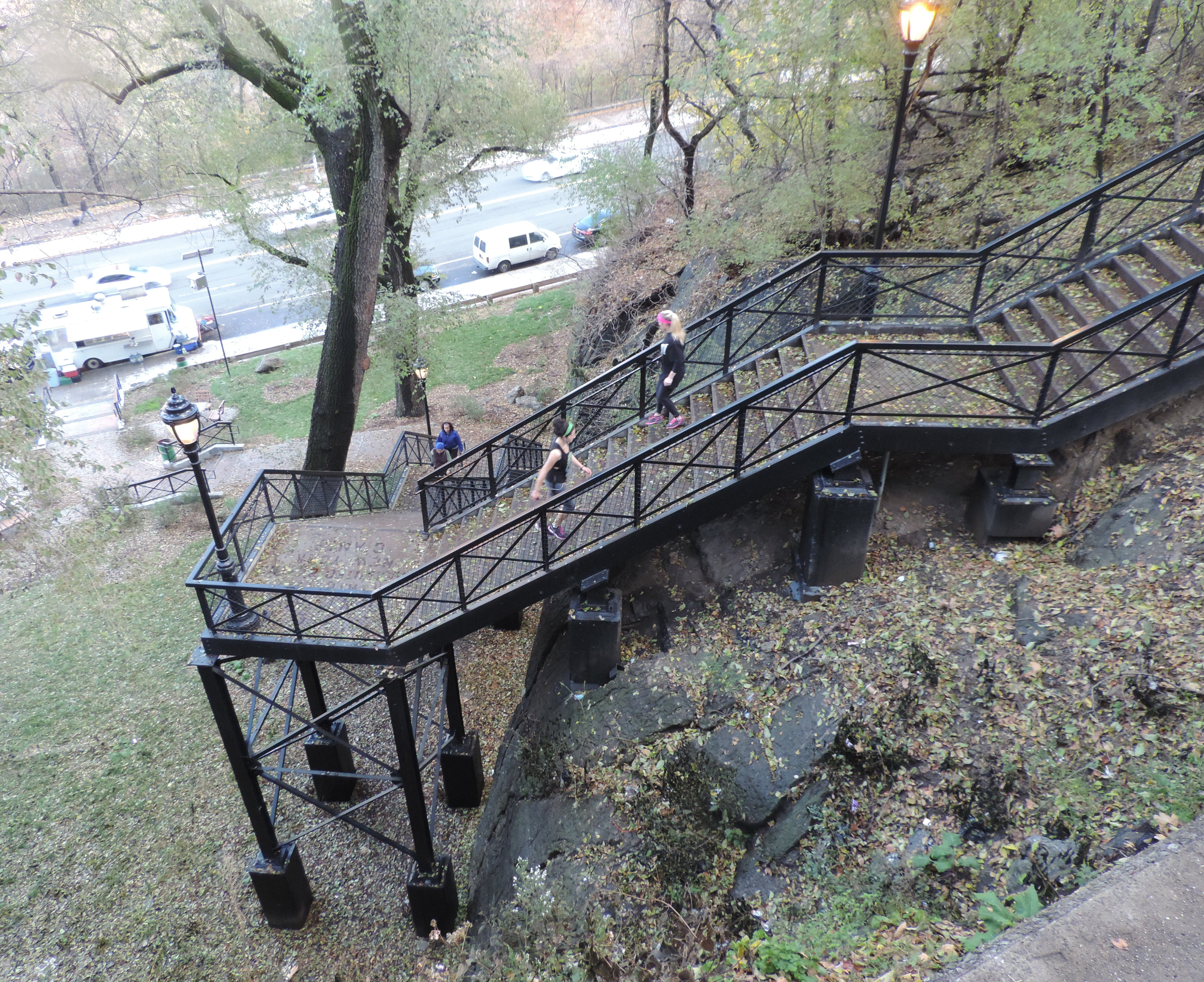
The John T. Brush stairway (40.8325°N 73.93945°W)

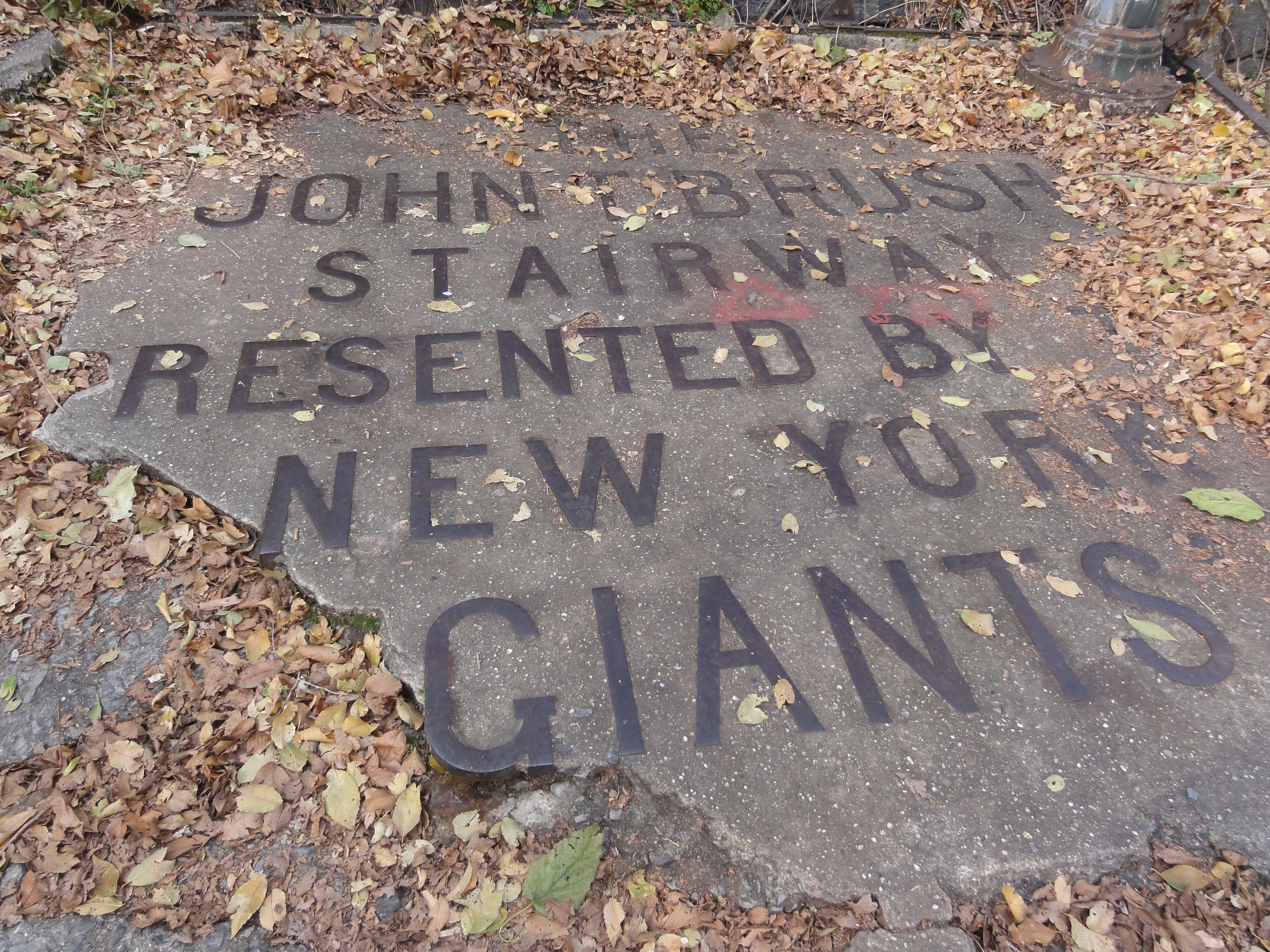

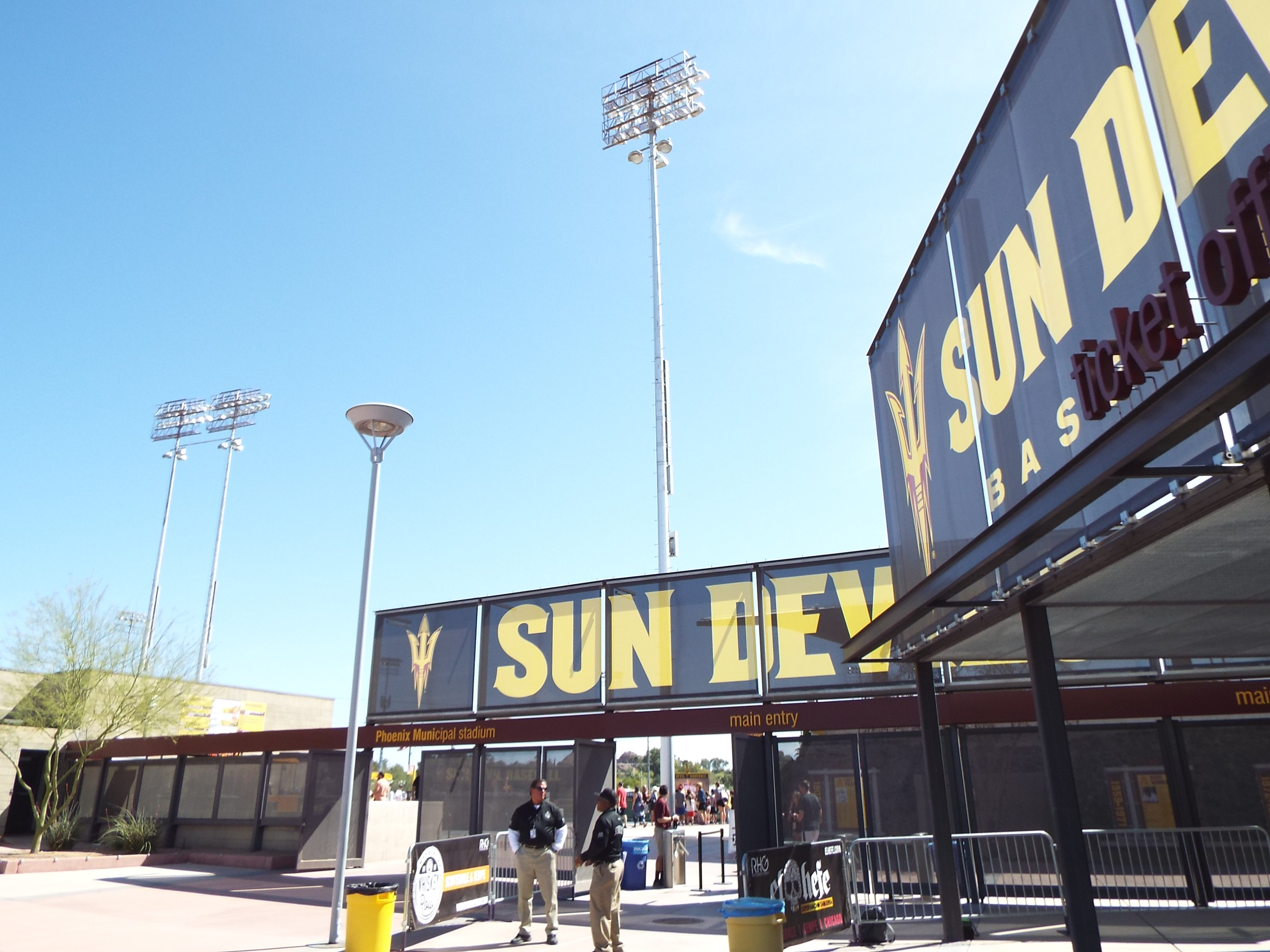
The main entrance of the Phoenix Municipal Stadium with the Polo Grounds light poles in the background

The only part of the Polo Grounds that still remains is the "John T. Brush Stairway", which runs down Coogan's Bluff from Edgecombe Avenue to Harlem River Driveway at about 158th Street. The stairway, named for John T. Brush—the then-recently deceased owner of the Giants—opened in 1913 and led to a ticket booth overlooking the stadium. The stairway reportedly offered a clear view of the stadium for fans who did not purchase tickets to a game. A marker on the stairway reads: "The John T. Brush Stairway Presented By The New York Giants."

Donations from the New York Giants, Jets, Yankees, Mets, San Francisco Giants, and Major League Baseball enabled a $950,000 restoration project that began in 2011. The restoration was scheduled to be completed in September 2012, but after numerous delays, the restored steps opened finally in early August 2014.

=== Polo Grounds light poles ===
The light poles from the Polo Grounds remain in use at Phoenix Municipal Stadium, Arizona State University's baseball field in Phoenix, Arizona, built in 1964. When the stadium was built, Horace Stoneham, owner of the San Francisco Giants, had the original Polo Grounds light poles shipped there. The Giants held spring training at the stadium's predecessor since 1947 and played at the new ballpark during spring training in 1964. The poles were installed in the stadium where they currently remain standing.

== Timeline and teams ==
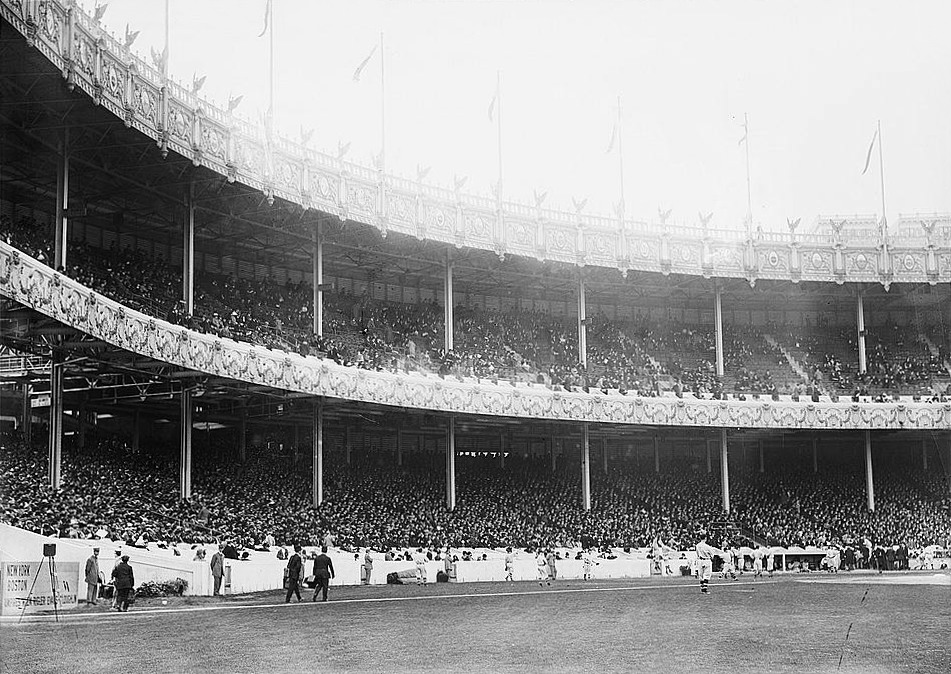
Crowd at refurbished Polo Grounds III, October 8, 1912, Game 1 of the 1912 World Series

- Polo Grounds I
  - Gothams/Giants (National League), 1883–1888
  - Metropolitans (American Association), 1880–1885
- Polo Grounds II (otherwise known as Manhattan Field)
  - Giants (NL), 1889–1890
- Polo Grounds III (originally called Brotherhood Park, also known as Brush Stadium from 1911 to 1919)
  - Giants (Players' League), 1890
  - Giants (NL), 1891–1911
  - Giants (NL), 1911–1957
  - Yankees (American League), 1913–1922
  - Giants (NFL), 1925–1955
  - Bulldogs (NFL) 1949
  - Titans/Jets (AFL), 1960–1963
  - Mets (NL), 1962–1963
  - Cubans (Negro National League II), 1939–1950
  - Black Yankees (Negro National League II), 1931–1946

== Statistics ==
=== Dimensions ===
Compiled from various photos, baseball annuals, The Official Encyclopedia of Baseball (Turkin & Thompson, 1951) and Green Cathedrals by Phil Lowry.

Diagram of the Polo Grounds drawn in 1951

1890–1911
Dimension	Distance	Notes
Left Field Line	335 ft (102 m)	Not posted
Center Field	500 ft (150 m)	Not posted
Right Field Line	335 ft (102 m)	Not posted

1911–1922
Dimension	Distance	Notes
Left Field Line	277 ft (84 m)	Not posted
Center Field	433 ft (132 m)	Not posted
Right Field Line	258 ft (79 m)	Not posted

1923–1957, 1962–1963
Dimension	Distance	Notes
Left Field Line	279 ft (85 m)	Not posted—sometimes listed as 280
Left Field Upper Deck Overhang	about 250 ft (76 m)	
Shallow Left Center	315 ft (96 m)	
Left Center 1	360 ft (110 m)	
Left Center 2	414 ft (126 m)	
Deep Left Center	447 ft (136 m)	Left of bullpen curve
Deep Left Center	455 ft (139 m)	Right of bullpen curve
Center Field	Approx. 425 ft (130 m)	(Unposted) corners of runways
Center Field	483 ft (147 m)	Posted on front of clubhouse balcony, sometimes 475 ft (145 m)
Center Field	505 ft (154 m)	(Unposted) sometimes given as total C.F. distance
Deep Right Center	455 ft (139 m)	Left of bullpen curve
Deep Right Center	449 ft (137 m)	Right of bullpen curve
Right Center 2	395 ft (120 m)	
Right Center 1	339 ft (103 m)	
Shallow Right Center	294 ft (90 m)	
Right Field Line	257 ft. 3 3/8 in.	Not posted—sometimes listed as 258
Backstop	65 ft (20 m)	Sometimes also given as 74 ft (23 m)

The disparities in some of the posted distances, notably straightaway center, have not been fully reconciled by researchers. The closest object in straight center field was the Grant Memorial, followed by the post supporting the overhang of the clubhouse (above which the 483 or 475 signs were posted), and a roll-up door several feet behind the overhang at ground level. The roof of the protruding part of the clubhouse sloped back and met the vertical wall of the larger part of the clubhouse. The exact objects referred to by the numbers 475, 483, and 505 can be speculated but remain unconfirmed. In 1931, additional box seats were built and the infield was moved 8 feet toward center field, while the 483 sign remained as-is. That at least accounts for the 483/475 (and also 433/425) discrepancies, though not identifying precisely what object the 483/475 signs referred to.

=== Seating capacity ===
Years	Capacity
1911–1916	34,000
1917–1919	36,000
1920–1922	38,000
1923–1925	43,000
1926–1929	55,000
1930–1935	56,000
1937–1939	51,856
1940–1946	56,000
1947–1952	54,500
1953–1963	56,000

== See also ==
- Polo Grounds Shuttle, an elevated railway shuttle to the grounds
- Bushman Steps, a set of stairs descending to the grounds

Events and tenants
Preceded by first ballpark St. George Cricket Grounds; Hilltop Park	Home of the New York Giants; 1883 – 1888; 1889 – 1911; 1911 – 1957	Succeeded by Oakland Park; Hilltop Park; Seals Stadium
Preceded by Hilltop Park	Home of the New York Yankees; 1913–1922	Succeeded by Yankee Stadium
Preceded by first ballpark	Home of the New York Mets; 1962–1963	Succeeded by Shea Stadium
Preceded by first ballpark	Home of the New York Giants (NFL); 1925–1955	Succeeded by Yankee Stadium
Preceded by first ballpark	Home of the New York Titans/Jets; 1960–1963	Succeeded by Shea Stadium
Preceded by Comiskey Park; Briggs Stadium	Host of the All-Star Game; 1934; 1942	Succeeded by Cleveland Stadium; Shibe Park
Preceded by Gilmore Stadium	Home of the NFL All-Star Game; 1941	Succeeded by Shibe Park
Preceded by Croke Park	All-Ireland Senior Football Championship; Final Venue; 1947	Succeeded by Croke Park
