= Luisa Villani =

Italian operatic soprano

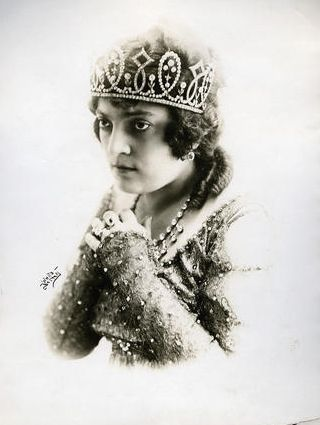
Luisa Villani ca. 1910

Luisa Villani (1884, San Francisco - 1961, Milan) was an Italian operatic soprano of American birth. She is best remembered for creating the role of Fiora in the world premiere of Italo Montemezzi's L'amore dei tre re at La Scala in 1913.

== Life and career ==
Born in San Francisco, California, Villani was the daughter of Italian opera singers Giuseppina Zeppilli and Vincenzo Villani who were on a North American concert tour when she was born. Her grandfather was the Italian tenor Giuseppe Villani who had notably created the role of Peri in the world premiere of Antônio Carlos Gomes's Il Guarany at La Scala in 1870. Her father was a baritone and her uncles were also opera singers; the baritone Giuseppe Villani and the bass Roberto Villani. Roberto Villani was the father of soprano Renata Villani and the husband of opera singer Maria Santoliva-Villani. Luisa's mother, a contralto, was the aunt of the famous soprano Alice Zeppilli.

Villani moved with her parents to Milan, Italy at a young age, and was trained in that city by her father. She made her professional opera debut in 1907 at La Scala as Euridice in Orfeo ed Euridice opposite Maria Gay in the role of Orfeo. She next appeared at the Teatro Costanzi in Rome in the roles of Desdemona in Giuseppe Verdi's Otello and Eva in Richard Wagner's Die Meistersinger von Nürnberg.

In 1909 Villani joined the roster of singers of Ivan Abramson's short lived New York City based Italian Grand Opera Company who were engaged for the Fall 1909 opera season at the Academy of Music under the management of Antonio Ferrara. She arrived in the United States on the SS La Lorraine on March 21, 1909 Villani performed two leading roles in the Italian Grand Opera's season at the Academy of Music in September 1909: Mimi in Puccini's La bohème and Cio-Cio-San in Puccini's Madama Butterfly. On February 8, 1910, she portrayed the title role in the United States premiere of William Legrand Howland's Sarrona, or, The Indian Slave at the New Amsterdam Theatre on Broadway.

Villani toured North America with both the Bessie Abott Opera Company in 1910 and Henry Wilson Savage's opera company in 1911. With the latter company she notably performed the role of Minnie in the first English language production of Giacomo Puccini's La fanciulla del West at the Poll's Theater in Bridgeport, Connecticut on October 27, 1911. She also performed at the Teatro Arbeu in Mexico City as Mimi in Puccini's La bohème in 1910, and appeared with the Boston Opera Company as Leonora in Il trovatore in November 1910 with Carlo Galeffi as the Count di Luna.

In 1913 Villani returned to Milan where she was once again committed to La Scala. There she created the role of Fiora in the world premiere of Italo Montemezzi's L'amore dei tre re on April 10, 1913. She returned to the United States later that year to join the roster of artists at the Boston Opera Company where she was a resident artist until the company's demise in 1915. She also performed at her His Majesty's Theatre, Montreal as Santuzza in Cavalleria rusticana in 1913, and at the Gran Teatro de La Habana in 1914. In 1915 she made her debut at the Metropolitan Opera as Cio-Cio-San in Puccini's Madama Butterfly. She then joined Max Rabinoff's Boston National Opera for performances in 1915–1916 season; including going on tour with the company to Cleveland for performances of the role of Maddalena di Coigny in Andrea Chénier. She continued performing and touring with Rabinoff's Boston company in 1917; notably portraying the title role in Aida at the Lyric Theatre in Baltimore with company in January 1917 with Giovanni Zenatello as Radamès. In 1917 she also starred in multiple opera productions staged at Columbia University, including portraying the title role in Tosca.

In 1918 Villani returned to Italy where she continued to perform. She also had a second career as a voice teacher in Florence before living her final years at the Casa di Riposo per Musicisti in Milan where she died in 1961.
