= Léon Rothier =

French operatic bass

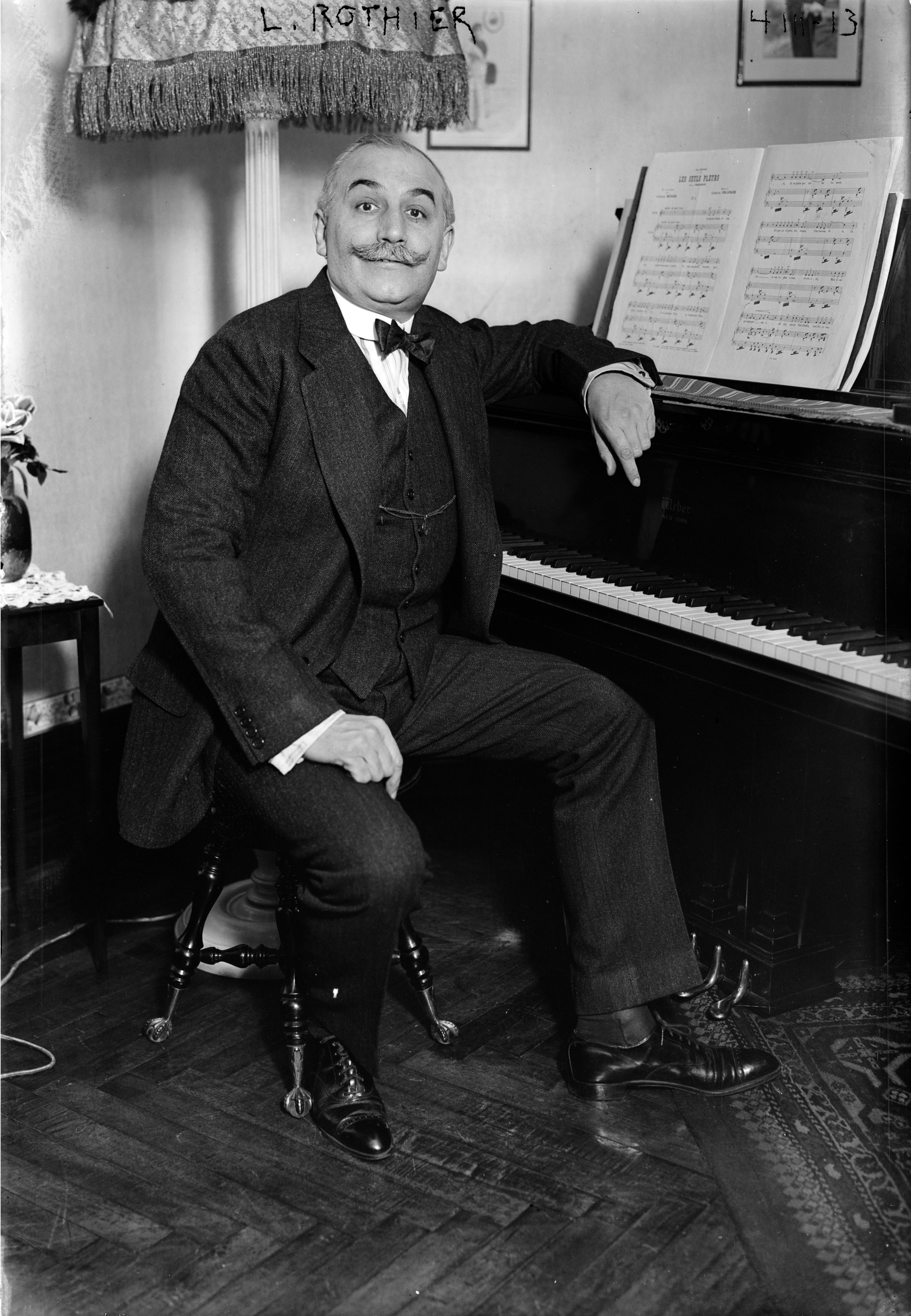
Léon Rothier at his piano circa 1915

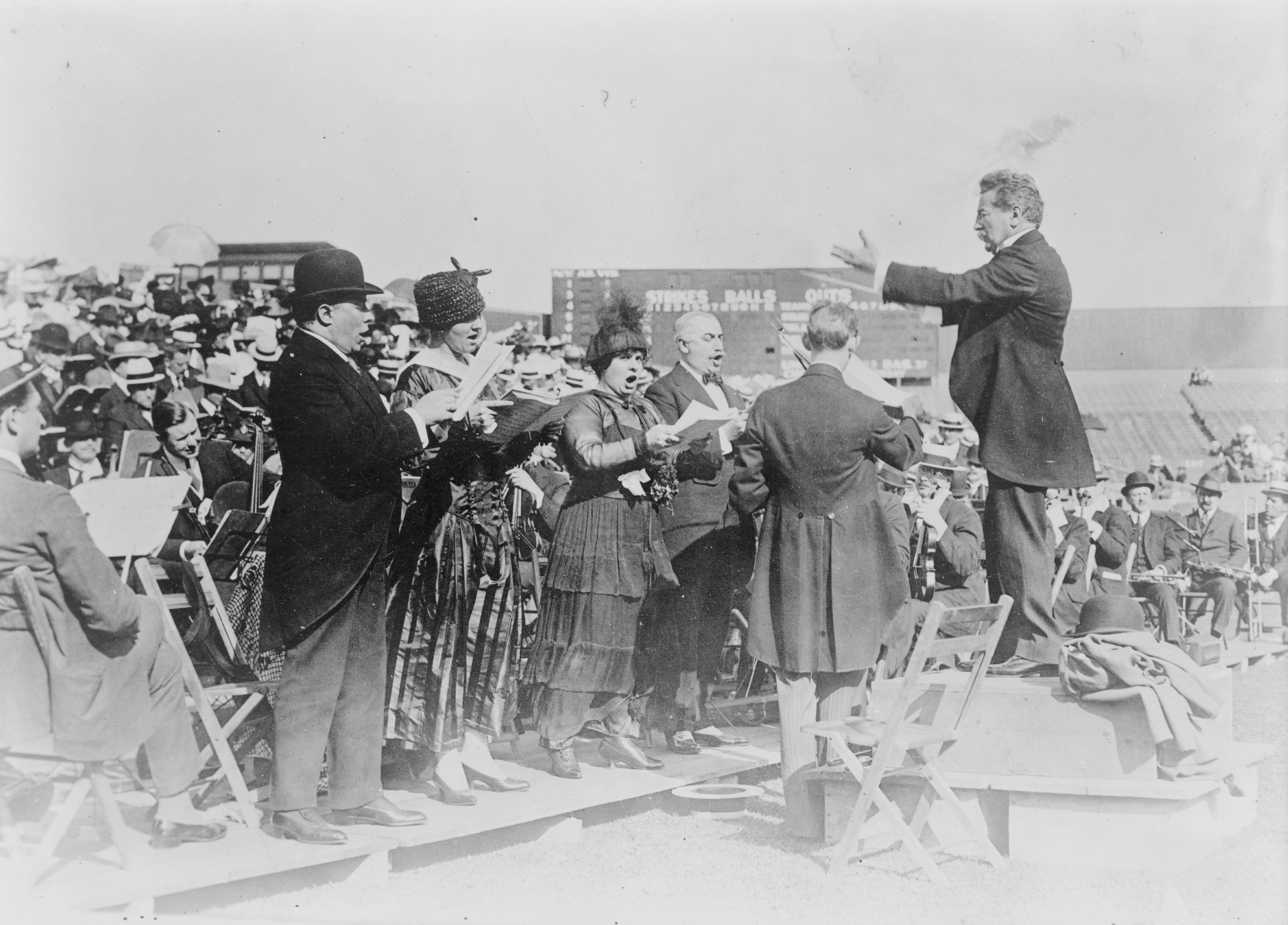
Rothier (right, singing) performing Verdi's Requiem at the Polo Grounds in New York City in 1916, along with (from l. to r.) Giovanni Zenatello, Louise Homer (under the assumed name of 'Lucile Lawrence') and Maria Gay; Louis Koemmenich conducting.

Léon Rothier (December 26, 1874 – December 6, 1951) was a French operatic bass who enjoyed a long association with New York's Metropolitan Opera.

== Biography ==
Rothier was born in 1874 in Reims, in the Champagne-Ardenne région of northern France. In this city he began his career as a violinist, but afterwards traveled to the Conservatoire de Paris to study voice.

In 1899, he made his singing debut at the Opéra-Comique in Paris, in Charles Gounod's Philémon et Baucis. One year later, he participated in the premiere of Gustave Charpentier's Louise. Rothier left the Opéra-Comique in 1907, and after some short stints with a few smaller French opera companies, moved to the United States, beginning a 30-year association with the Metropolitan Opera in New York City. He created the role of Grandfather Tyl in L'oiseau bleu by Albert Wolff (1919). He was still fulfilling public singing engagements in New York City as late as 1949, at The Town Hall performance space.

He died in New York City on December 6, 1951.

== Legacy ==
In the sequence of important French-born basses to be heard at the Met, he followed in the footsteps of Pol Plançon and Marcel Journet. Rothier made several sound recordings during his lifetime, including two excerpts from Un ballo in maschera with the great tenor Enrico Caruso. Rothier also appeared in one or two motion pictures, Webb Singing Pictures (1917), and possibly one made by Lee de Forest in his Phonofilm sound-on-film process around 1922.
