= Boston Opera Company =

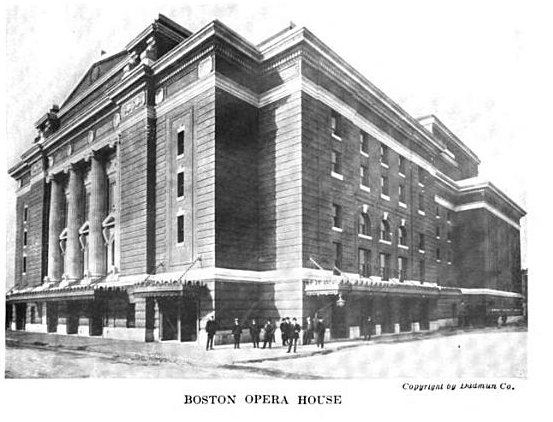
The 1909 Boston Opera House, circa 1913

The Boston Opera Company (BOC) was an American opera company located in Boston, Massachusetts, that was active from 1909 to 1915.

== History ==
The company was founded in 1908 by Bostonian millionaire Eben Dyer Jordan, Jr. and impresario Henry Russell. Jordan, an opera enthusiast and amateur singer, was the heir to a department store fortune and provided the company's financial backing for its first three seasons. He also provided the funds necessary to complete the Boston Opera House, as the theatre's construction had been halted for some years due to lack of finances.

Russell had worked as a talent manager and opera director in Europe and from 1906 until 1909 his touring opera company, the San Carlo Opera Company (SCOC), had been based in Boston when not on the road. The SCOC was basically the artistic seed for the new Boston Opera Company as many artists working for this touring company, such as Alice Nielsen, Lillian Nordica, Florencio Constantino, and Louise Homer, became a part of the Boston Opera Company. The company's first performance was given for the opening of the Boston Opera House on November 8, 1909. The company presented Amilcare Ponchielli's La Gioconda with Nordica in the title role and Homer as La Cieca.

In 1910 the BOC entered into a partnership with the Metropolitan Opera and the Chicago Grand Opera Company with the formation of an opera trust between the organizations and Russell officially being made an Advisory Associate to the Metropolitan Opera. The trust was established to help recruit and keep top talent from Europe. None of the companies could offer long enough performance engagements on their own to be attractive to the best singers, but by extending contracts to artists for performance between all three companies they were able to bring major talent from Europe to the United States.

During its six seasons the BOC presented a wide array of works, including two contemporary operas by Boston composer Frederick Converse: The Pipe of Desire and The Sacrifice. Although the company was admired for its artistic excellence (largely due to the fine conducting by Felix Weingartner), the organization was plagued with financial worries after the initial backing by Jordan ended. These monetary problems eventually forced the company to declare bankruptcy on May 11, 1915.

== Notable singers ==
- Elizabeth Amsden
- Georges Baklanoff
- Marguerite Bériza
- Eugenia Bronskaya
- Edmond Clément
- Florencio Constantino
- Diamond Donner
- Edoardo Ferrari-Fontana
- Mary Garden
- Maria Gay
- Louise Homer
- Georgette Leblanc
- Lydia Lipkowska
- Pavel Ludikar
- Vanni Marcoux
- Edith Mason
- Nellie Melba
- Carmen Melis
- Tamaki Miura
- Jane Morgan
- Lucien Muratore
- Marguerite Namara
- Alice Nielsen
- Lillian Nordica
- Evelyn Parnell
- Antonio Pini-Corsi
- Giovanni Polese
- Evelyn Scotney
- Myrna Sharlow
- Marguerite Sylva
- Luisa Tetrazzini
- Maggie Teyte
- Luisa Villani
- Giovanni Zenatello
