= Boston Opera House (1909) =

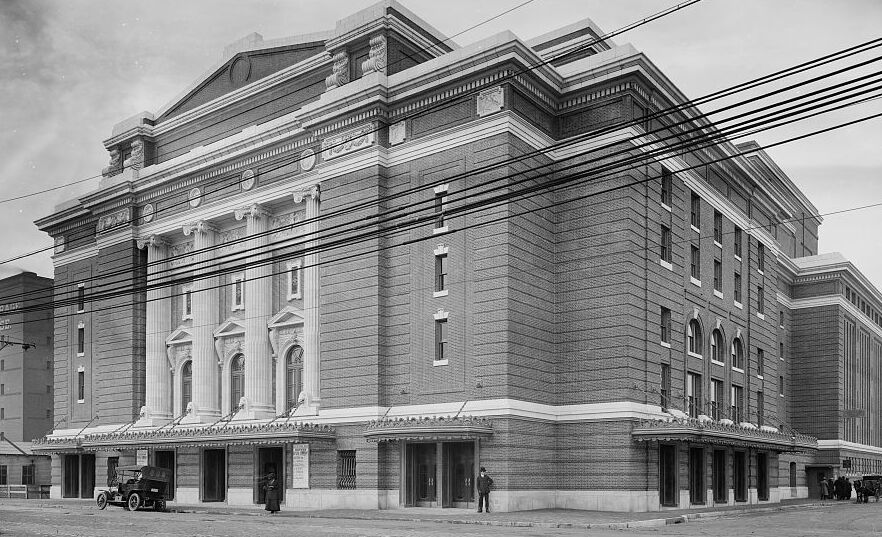
- The Boston Opera House, c. 1910
- Interactive map of the Boston Opera House area

General information
- Type: Opera house
- Location: Huntington Avenue, Boston, Massachusetts, United States
- Coordinates: 42°20′26″N 71°05′22″W
- Opened: November 8, 1909
- Demolished: 1958
- Owner: Boston Opera Company

Design and construction
- Architecture firm: Wheelwright and Haven

The Boston Opera House was an opera house located on Huntington Avenue in Boston, Massachusetts. It opened in 1909 (117 years ago) as the home of the Boston Opera Company and was demolished in 1958 (68 years ago) after years of disuse.

Speare Hall, a Northeastern University dormitory, now stands on the site at the corner of Opera Place and Huntington Avenue.

== History ==
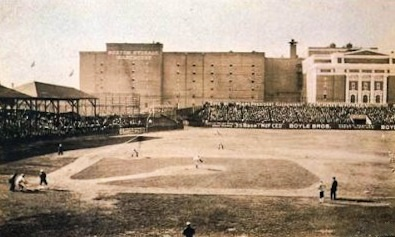
Huntington Avenue Grounds, home of the Red Sox from 1901 through 1911, with Opera House visible in upper right

=== Construction ===
Designed by the Boston architects Wheelwright and Haven, construction began on the Boston Opera House in 1901 but due to financial difficulties the completion of the opera house was delayed. Eventually Bostonian millionaire Eben Dyer Jordan stepped forward in 1908 to provide $700,000 in funds to finish the building and provide a home for the newly formed Boston Opera Company (BOC) under the leadership of impresario Henry Russell. Guido Nincheri provided interior decoration for the theatre which was located two blocks from Boston Symphony Hall, and one block from the New England Conservatory of Music.

=== Opening ===
The opera house officially opened on November 8, 1909, with a performance of La Gioconda by the BOC. The production starred Lillian Nordica in the title role, Florencio Constantino as Enzo, and Louise Homer as La Cieca. At its opening, the theatre was described as a "perfect jewel-box of an opera house". It served as the home of the BOC during the company's six years of operation. Russell served as the company's director for all its short duration and Arnaldo Conti was the conductor from 1909–1913. After the BOC went bankrupt in 1915 the venue was used by other local opera companies, as well as by the Metropolitan Opera for its regular visits.

=== Demise ===
During the Great Depression and World War II, the Opera House fell into disuse and disrepair.

In 1957, the Boston Redevelopment Authority, acting on behalf of the Northeastern University Trustees, declared it unsafe, and scheduled it for demolition. The local opera community demonstrated and petitioned the BRA to spare their only venue, but the order stood. The solidly built building was gutted in 1958, but proved difficult to demolish. Two demolition companies gave up in frustration, as the opera house resisted their efforts. Only after a new and larger wrecking derrick arrived, did the walls fall.

"It was the era of urban renewal," Boston impresario Walter Pierce was quoted as saying, "Anything old was shameful."

A brick rescued from the demolished theater by noted WGBH-FM announcer Ron Della Chiesa is preserved in the theater's archives at Northeastern University. The archived plans for the Opera House may be viewed and copied by requesting an appointment with Northeastern University's Facilities or Space Planning and Design Department.

== See also ==
- Boston Opera House (1980)
