= Giovanni Zenatello =

Italian opera singer (1876–1949)

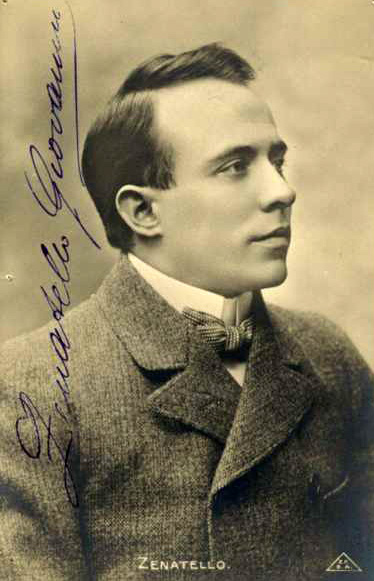
Giovanni Zenatello circa 1905

Giovanni Zenatello (22 February 1876 – 11 February 1949) was an Italian opera singer. Born in Verona, he enjoyed an international career as a dramatic tenor of the first rank. Otello became his most famous operatic role but his repertoire also included French roles. In 1904, he created the part of Pinkerton in Madama Butterfly.

== Career ==
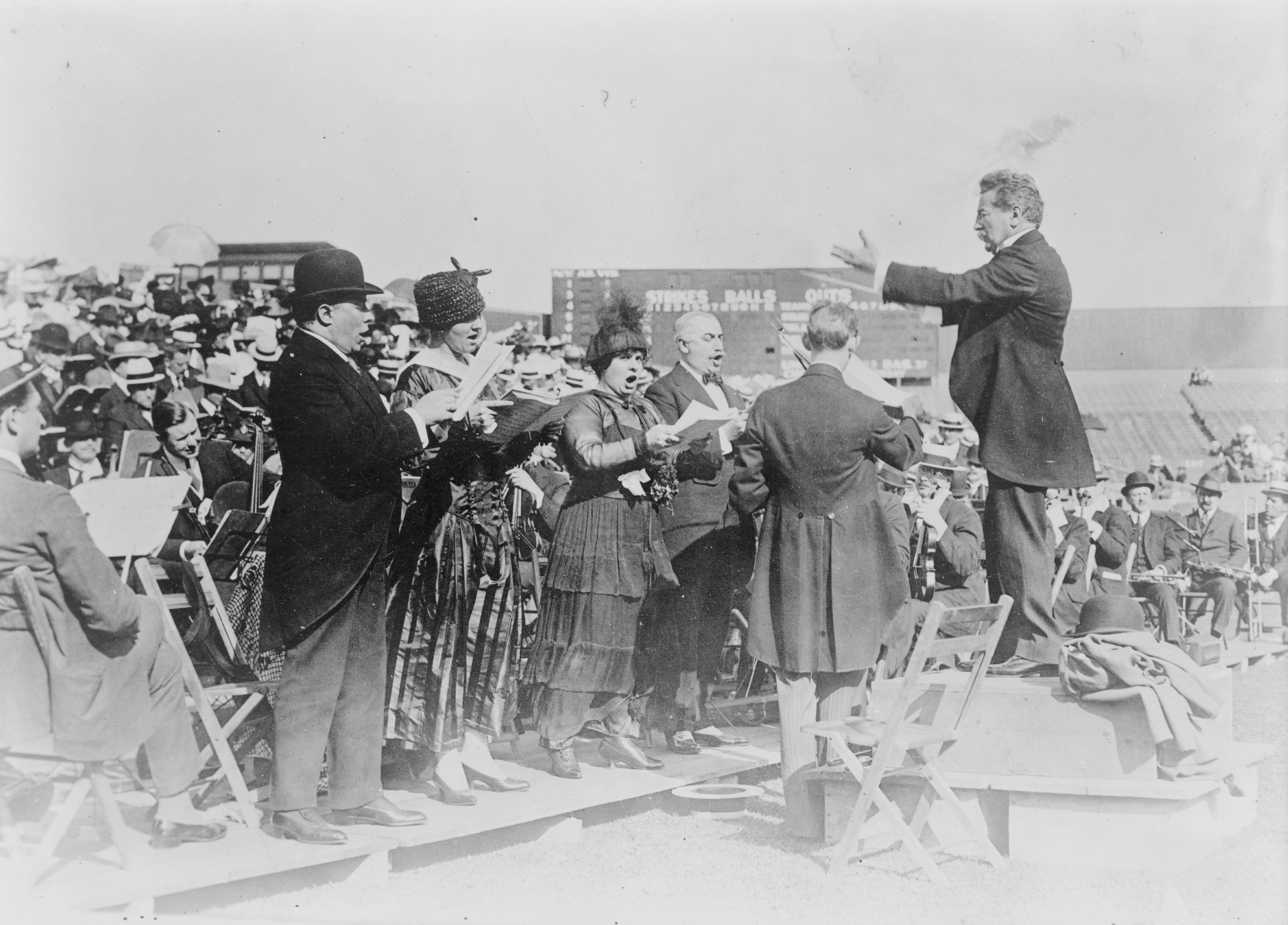
Zenatello (left) performing Giuseppe Verdi's Requiem at the Polo Grounds in New York City in 1916, along with Louise Homer (under the assumed name of 'Lucile Lawrence'), Maria Gay, and Léon Rothier; Louis Koemmenich conducting

Zenatello showed musical promise from a young age. His singing teacher in Verona originally trained him as a baritone but he never felt comfortable in this range and later switched to the higher tenor register. Nonetheless, it was as a baritone that he made his professional debut at Belluno in 1898. His tenor debut—as Canio—did not come until the following year, in Naples.

Zenatello's operatic career gathered momentum during the early years of the 20th century, and on 17 February 1904 he created the role of Pinkerton in the world première of Giacomo Puccini's Madama Butterfly at La Scala, Milan. La Scala was Italy's leading opera house, and he remained a member of its company of singers until 1907.

He also sang at the Royal Opera House, Covent Garden, London, in 1905/06 and 1908/09; at the Manhattan Opera House in 1907 to 1910; and with the New York Metropolitan Opera company, on tour, replacing Enrico Caruso, in 1909. He was a member of the Boston Opera Company from 1909 to 1914 and sang often, too, in South America and Mexico and in various cities of continental Europe.

Zenatello's voice had matured into that of a clarion-voiced dramatic tenor during his La Scala years, and he succeeded Francesco Tamagno (1850–1905) as the greatest Italian exponent of Giuseppe Verdi's Otello, a role which the Austrian dramatic tenor Leo Slezak sang to equal acclaim. Zenatello performed this extremely taxing role more than 300 times, beginning in 1908, and recorded highly acclaimed excerpts from the work on 78-rpm discs.

Zenatello returned to Covent Garden in 1926, singing Otello in a series of performances which were partly recorded live by His Master's Voice. After a final stage appearance (in New York City) in 1933, he retired from opera and taught singing and dabbled in the management of promising young singers. The coloratura soprano Lily Pons was a notable 'discovery' of Zenatello's in the twilight of his on-stage career. He took Pons under his wing and arranged for her an audition before the Met's general manager, which resulted in the young French-born singer making a successful New York debut in 1931. Later, however, they fell out.

Another great pupil of his was the Veronese tenor Nino Martini who made his Metropolitan Opera debut in Rigoletto in 1933, which enabled Martini to begin an acclaimed career at the Metropolitan (1933-1946), in other American venues, and in Hollywood as well. As to his private life, Zenatello lived with the Spanish mezzo-soprano Maria Gay from 1906 until her death in 1943. They were often described as husband and wife although they may never have actually married. He and Gay performed opposite each other on many occasions and settled down together in Manhattan in 1936.

In 1913, Zenatello had been instrumental in having the Verona Arena, built originally by the ancient Romans, restored and turned into a world-famous open-air venue for operatic performances. That same year the arena was used to mount a grand production of Aida, marking the centenary of Verdi's birth. In 1947, Zenatello arranged for a promising young soprano named Maria Callas and an American tenor and cantor Richard Tucker to appear at the arena's Summer Festival in Amilcare Ponchielli's opera La Gioconda. This appearance would give Callas and Tucker invaluable exposure in Italy and helped set Callas on the path to future international stardom.

Giovanni Zenatello died of natural causes in New York City in 1949, aged 73.

== Recordings ==
Zenatello left an important musical legacy in the form of a considerable number of commercial recordings of his voice, made both acoustically and, after 1925, with the aid of microphone technology. His first discs were made in Italy by The Gramophone Company in 1903, followed by a long series for Fonotipia Records. Later, he recorded for the Columbia, Edison and His Master's Voice labels. These recordings of operatic arias, duets and ensembles, as well as just one (unpublished) song title (Zenatello was never a song recitalist as was Caruso), have been reissued on CD in recent years, most notably by the English firms Pearl and Symposium Records and on the Austrian Preiser label. They reflect the wide range of his repertoire and the best of them confirm the impressive power, thrust and ardency of his singing as well as often suspect intonation. Zenatello left recorded memoirs from the roles he created (including arias and duets from Siberia, Madame Butterfly, and La Figlia di Jorio).

A radio interview with an elderly Zenatello, recorded in 1947, includes a creditable (if transposed downwards, due to the singer's age) piano accompanied performance of the closing scene "Niun mi tema" from Otello. This interview was reissued in the 1960s and can be heard on CD.

== Roles created ==
- 1903: Vassili in Siberia (Umberto Giordano)*
- 1903: Init in Oceàna (Antonio Smareglia)
- 1904: Pinkerton in Madama Butterfly (Giacomo Puccini)* – Zenatello created the role of Pinkerton twice; he appeared in the failed premiere and the more successful major revision.
- 1906: Aligi in La figlia di Iorio (Alberto Franchetti)*
- 1907: Lionetto de' Ricci ("Il Fortebrando") in Gloria (Francesco Cilea)

Key: * Zenatello made commercial recordings of excerpts of these operas (for the Fonotipia company for all, and also for G&T for Siberia.)
