= Eugenia Bronskaya =

Russian soprano

Evgenia (Eugenia) Bronskaya
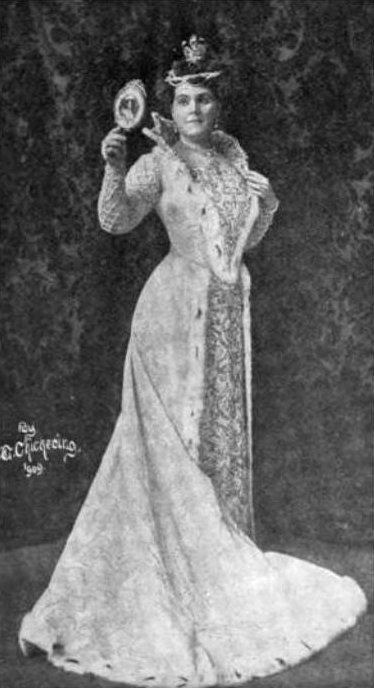
- Portrait of Evgenia Bronskaya from National Magazine, Volume 32, April 1910, page 68

Background information
- Born: Evgeneia Adolfovna Gakke (von Hacke); 20 January 1882; St.Petersburg, Russia
- Died: 12 October 1953 (aged 71) Leningrad, Russia
- Occupation: Opera singer
- Years active: 1900–1923
- Spouse: Georgi Makarov

Evgenia (Eugenia) Adolfovna Bronskaya (born von Hacke, or in Russian Gakke) (20 January (1 February) 1882 (she also claimed 1884 or 1888), St.Petersburg — 12 October 1953, Leningrad) was a coloratura soprano and later singing teacher. She was particularly known for her portrayals of Lucia, Gilda, and Violetta.

== Early life ==
She was born the daughter of A.K.von Hacke, an architect in the minor nobility; her mother was a former singer E. de Hacke. Her mother, a fine teacher, taught her in her class at a private music school in St. Petersburg between 1897 and 1900; the young singer also learned piano there with F.Czerny. Her first concert appearance was in the minor resort of Gunterburg on the Baltic coast some 150km west of St.Petersburg, on 10 August 1896, though her formal concert debut was in St.Petersburg on 19 December 1899, which was reported favourably in the Peterburgskaya Gazeta.

== Career ==
Bronskaya made her stage debut, using the name 'Bronskaya' for the first time, in Flotow's Marta on 17 October 1900. She performed several more operas with the baritone Maximilian Maksakov who invited her to sing leading roles with his Arcadia Theatre company that summer; she thus sang alongside other upcoming stars like Leonid Sobinov and Feodor Chaliapin.

She joined the Tiflis Opera for the autumn season 1901–1902, before returning to St. Petersburg for the summer 1902 season at the Aquarium Theatre, again singing roles opposite Sobinov and Medea Mei-Figner. She sang in Kyiv for the next two years (1902–1904), touring in Odessa and Tiflis, and then sang in Moscow in 1904–1906.

In summer 1906 she studied in Italy with the famous Teresa Arkel, though some sources place this in 1900 which seems less likely. Following another season in St.Petersburg, this led to Italian tours in the years from 1907 onwards, where she headlined opposite stars such as Titta Ruffo and Giuseppe Anselmi, singing in all the major opera houses. In particular she sang in the first performance of Eugene Onegin at the Teatro La Fenice, Venice, opposite her husband, the baritone Georgi Makarov. They also created roles in the local premiere of Massenet's La Navarraise.

In the autumn of 1909 she travelled to the United States; though she appeared as Bronskaya in Boston

she proved to be none other than Mme Makarov, the coloratura soprano who was singing in September at the Academy of Music in New York

She toured with the Boston Opera company in this and the following year, and became known as the 'Russian Tetrazzini'. She made a number of successful recordings for Columbia in the USA with other members of the company during this period. It was also at this time that a famous anecdote was created: she is said to have stepped into the role of Lucia at short notice, knowing nothing but the main set pieces, and therefore having to invent most of the recitative as she went along. The critic H.T.Parker said there was "hardly a jar to the illusion. It was gallantly done."

She continued to work in Italy, and in 1910 was invited to join the Mariinsky Theatre company in St.Petersburg. Her first performance there was on 2 September 1910, in the role of Lakmé. After the departure of Lydia Lipkowska in 1913, she became the company's leading coloratura soprano with a repertoire of some 36 roles. In 1915, she created there the role of the Swan Princess in Rimsky-Korsakov's Tale of Tsar Saltan.

She remained with the Mariinsky until 1923 when she retired; her last performance, as Micaela in Carmen, was on 18 May 1923. She then taught singing at the St Petersburg Conservatory (1923–1950), becoming Professor of Voice in 1926; she taught graduate students from 1935, and remained in Leningrad through the Second War, teaching also at the Music School (1943–1944) and in the Leningrad Theater of Musical Comedy (1945–?). In 1944 she received the Leningrad Defense Medal.

From 1917 and during her retirement she actively participated in concerts for workers and military personnel.

Bronskaya died in Leningrad in 1953.

== Assessment ==
Bronskaya had an outstandingly beautiful voice, smooth in all registers, and a 'silvery' timbre. Her voice had an extensive range. She maintained the style of the virtuoso school, as a critic in 'Theatre and Art' remarked:

The part of Violetta, despite its musical triviality, performed by Mrs. Bronskaya-Makarova, was of interest – as a revived, but once fashionable, virtuosic genre, where the flexibility of voice and technique is brought to the maximum ...

== Recordings ==
Bronskaya made a handful of recordings for Pathé Records in Moscow in 1905, which are now very rare; but most of her recordings were made in New York in 1910 for Columbia Records (about 28 records) and in St.Petersburg in 1912–1914 for the Gramophone Company (some 10 records). The recorded legacy broadly reflects her main repertoire. The American records mainly focus on the European coloratura repertoire; her Russian records add some representation of her Russian repertoire.
