= Arnaldo Conti =

Italian conductor (1855–1919)

Arnaldo Conti

Arnaldo Conti (Parma, 22 February 1855 – Milan, 24 March 1919) was an Italian conductor of opera.

He spent much of his life on tour in opera houses around the world, directing performances with singers such as Adelina Patti, Luisa Tetrazzini, Marcella Sembrich, Emma Calvé, Fernando De Lucia, Riccardo Stracciari, Antonio Scotti and Jean and Édouard de Reszke. He seems not to have sought publicity; he rarely ventured into concert hall, or the recording studio unlike his younger, fellow Parma-born conductors, Cleofonte Campanini and Arturo Toscanini.

He was at various times conductor at the Opéra-Italien (at the Théâtre-Italien), Paris; the Teatro Regio (Parma), Italy; the Teatro Real, Madrid; the Teatro Solís, Montevideo; the touring San Carlo Opera Company (originally from the Teatro di San Carlo, Naples) then in the US. From 1909 to 1913 he conducted the Boston Opera Company at the Boston Opera House.

== Family life ==
He married the soprano Erina Borlinetto.
