= Maria Gay =

Catalan opera singer

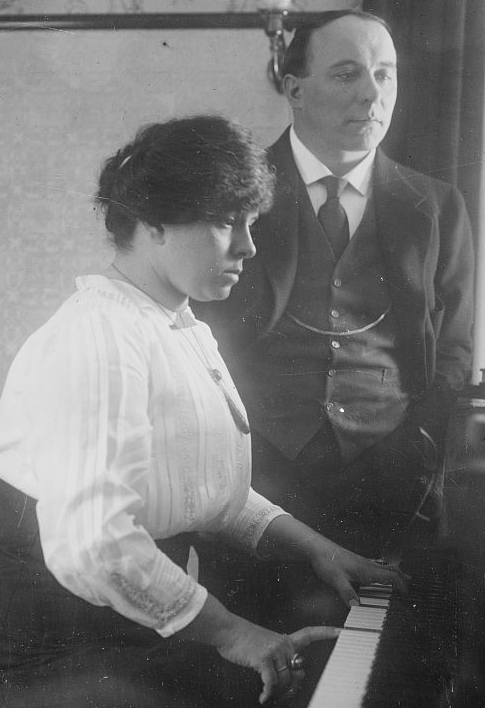
Maria Gay and Giovanni Zenatello

Maria Gay (12 June 1876 – 29 July 1943) was a Catalan opera singer, a mezzo-soprano born as Maria de Lourdes Lucia Antonia Pichot Gironés. She has sometimes been referred to as Maria Gay Zenatello.

== Biography ==
According to one story, young Maria was arrested for singing revolutionary or nationalist songs. She defiantly continued to sing them in prison, with a voice so fine she was offered a chance to study bel canto. She was a singing pupil of soprano Ada Adini.

In 1897, she married the Catalan composer Joan Gay i Planella, with whom she had two daughters and a son, all of whom died young: her daughters of illness as teenagers and her son in the war.

In 1902, she debuted in the title role of Carmen in Brussels. She was a hit in the role and became one of the best regarded interpreters of "Carmen" of her era. She reportedly shocked and mesmerized audiences, portraying the gypsy girl as an impudent, magnetic, but coarse and unrefined peasant, eating an orange and spitting out the seeds before singing the famous Habanera.

In 1906, she debuted at Milan's La Scala, where she met tenor Giovanni Zenatello. Gay and Zenatello would live together the rest of their lives, and were often described as husband and wife, although they may never actually have gotten married, and legally Maria Gay may still have been married to Joan Gay Planella until his death in 1926. In 1908, she made her debut in Carmen for the Met in New York City opposite Geraldine Farrar as Micaela. In 1910 she performed the same role with the Boston Opera Company as Carmen.

She made a series of gramophone records for the Columbia Phonograph Company.

Gay and Zenatello worked to find, help train, and promote promising young singers. Their most famous find was Lily Pons, who the couple managed until Pons and the couple had a falling-out.

Gay and Zenatello set up a home in Manhattan, New York City in 1936, where she lived the rest of her life. She died on 20 July 1943. Maria Gay was buried in Ferncliff Cemetery in Hartsdale, New York.
