= Francis Thornton (soldier) =

American soldier and plantation owner (1747–1808)

Lt. Francis Thornton
- Born: January 22, 1747; Gloucester County, Colony of Virginia, British America
- Died: November 18, 1808 (aged 61); Charlotte County, Virginia, US
- Other name: Frank Thornton
- Occupations: Planter, Soldier

Lt. Francis Thornton of Rolling Hill (January 22, 1747 – November 18, 1808) was a planter and soldier during the American Revolutionary War. Thornton served as cornet of Lee's Legion of Light Dragoons commanded by Major-General Henry "Light-Horse Harry" Lee. Thornton went on to serve as a lieutenant in the Charlotte County Militia in the later part of the Revolution. Thornton was the son of William Thornton a Burgess for Brunswick County, Virginia and a great-great-grandson of William Thornton who arrived in Virginia from England as late as 1646 settling in Gloucester County, Virginia. Thornton was commonly known as "Frank Thornton" as indicated in the historical record and often referred to as "Francis Thornton of Rolling Hill" to differentiate him from his cousins Francis Thornton of Fall Hill and Francis Thornton of Society Hill. Thornton was a distant cousin of Presidents James Madison and Zachary Taylor.

== Early life and education ==
Thornton was born in Gloucester County, Virginia to William Thornton a prominent Colonial Burgess and Judge and Jane Clack, the granddaughter of the Rev. James Clack. His parents were first cousins and benefited greatly not just the primogeniture status that settle a comfortable size estate upon William Thornton but also from an estate passed matrilineal from Peter Sterling, a seventeenth century surgeon with landholdings in Gloucester County, Virginia and Baltimore, Maryland. By 1753, Thornton's family removed to Brunswick County, Virginia where his father gained significant economic and political control. Thornton's formal education is not known, however inferred information from legal documents and the historical record indicate he received a formal education and was fully literate. Thornton married and set up his own household by 1769 obtaining land settled upon him in what is today Charlotte County, Virginia.

== American Revolution ==
Thornton was commissioned as cornet in Lee's Legion of Light Dragoons on April 21, 1778 serving until January 1, 1779. The majority of his period of service in the Continental ranks was training and foraging, his troop was involved in the retaliatory skirmish known as the "Battle of Edgar's Lane" on September 30, 1778 near Hastings-on-Hudson, New York. Thornton resigned his commission at the beginning of 1779, likely for needs of his family and plantation. In April 1780 Thornton took the Oath of Allegiance and mustered in as 2nd Lieutenant of the Charlotte County Militia. The Militia formed two companies which marched south to join Horatio Gates in the failed Battle of Camden in South Carolina. Thornton appears to not have been among those militiamen captured by the British in the aftermath of the campaign. Thornton's company joined General Greene's army and partook in the Battle of Guilford Courthouse. His company returned to Virginia following the battle and he was discharged of his services that year.

== Family ==
The name of Thornton's first wife is not known. No surviving primary sources record Thornton's first marriage and there has been some dispute as to who she was. Thornton's great-grandsons Cecil Miller Armistead and Henry Venable Armistead recorded that their great-grandmother was a "Miss Wyatt"in more than one source and in their applications for membership to the Sons of American Revolution. Thornton's great-granddaughter Lola Jane Carr Bates wrote a brief family history in 1913 in which she recorded his first wife as a "Miss Lacy" and his second as Lucy Ligon. Bates research has proved to have errors, the marriage recorded in her history between "Frank Thornton" and Lucy Ligon has shown in the historical record to have occurred in 1873 between Thornton's great-grandson also known as Frank Thornton and Lucy Daniel Ligon of Charlotte County, Virginia. What exists in the historical record provides evidence that the information provided by the Armistead brothers in the late 19th century is to be correct. Thornton was involved in a number of land transactions and legal actions with the Wyatt family and John Wyatt of Charlotte County, Virginia served as witness to his will and one of his executors. Additionally, legal transactions and notations by Thornton's grandchildren indicate that his wife was the granddaughter of Richard Wyatt and Sarah Overstreet. Thornton's second marriage was recorded October 15, 1801 to Anne Pettus.

Children of Francis Thornton:

- William Lacy Thornton, (born 10 Aug 1769 – died 30 Jan 1829). married Susannah Harvey of Charlotte County, Virginia
- Lucy Jane Thornton, (born 17 Aug 1773 – 22 Jan 1846). married Isham Richardson, removed to Hart County, Kentucky.
- John Wyatt Thornton, (born 14 Oct 1775 – died abt. 1842). an attorney in Charlotte County, Virginia. married (1) Elizabeth Pitts Vawter, married (2) Tabitha Agnes Paulett.
- Jane Clack Thornton, (born 14 May 1778 – died bef. 1830). married Alexander Brownlee, removed to Hart County, Kentucky.
- Ann Sterling Thornton, (born 17 Dec 1780 – died bef. 1860). married Benjamin Baldwin
- Sarah Overstreet Thornton, (born 22 Aug 1783 – died 24 Dec 1845). married (1) Paschall Jennings, married (2) John Hancock.
- Susannah Lacy "Susan" Thornton, (born 23 Dec 1786 – died bef. 1850). married John Tuggle. John and Susan Tuggle are the ancestors of Riccardo Martin, Bijie Martin and Charles F. G. Kuyk
- Dr. Richard Thornton, (born 23 Dec 1786 – died 1860). a prominent physician and planter in Halifax County Virginia. married (1) Sally Sterling Smith, married (2) Sarah 'Sallie' T. Lassiter. Thornton's home the Dr. Richard Thornton House was listed on the National Register of Historic Places in 2012.
- Dr. Presley Thornton, (born 1788 – died 13 Mar 1829). a physician in Halifax County Virginia. married Ellen Chase Whitman.
- Francis Wyatt Thornton, (born 28 Mar 1790 – died 1868). married Lavinia Davidson. removed to Buckingham County, Virginia
- Mary P. Thornton, (born 1796 – died abt. 1825), married John Nunnally, removed to Halifax County, Virginia. Mary Thornton's only child, Judith Nunnally Carter removed to Columbus, Texas and is the grandmother of former Dallas mayor J. Waddy Tate, her great granddaughter, Ivor O'Connor was the first wife of Harry Hays Morgan Jr.

== Later years ==
In the post Revolutionary period, Thornton was a prominent and successful planter in Charlotte County, Virginia. His farm complex was surveyed by the Virginia Department of Historic Resources in 1997. The main house burned in 2016 and does not survive. Thornton died November 18, 1808, his estate was disputed amongst his children and not settled until 1826.

== Ancestry ==
Thornton was a cousin of U.S. Presidents James Madison and Zachary Taylor through his great-grandfather William Thornton. Both presidents were matrilineal descendants of William Thornton. Thornton was a second cousin of North Carolina Chief Justice Thomas Ruffin through Capt. James Clack and his wife Mary Sterling.

Ancestors of Francis Thornton (soldier)

William Thornton
Francis Thornton
(possibly a daughter of William Presley)
William Thornton
Peter Sterling
Anne Sterling
Anne
Lt. Francis Thornton
Rev. James Clack
Capt. James Clack
Jane
Jane Clack
Peter Sterling
Mary Sterling
Anne
