= Rita Fornia =

American soprano

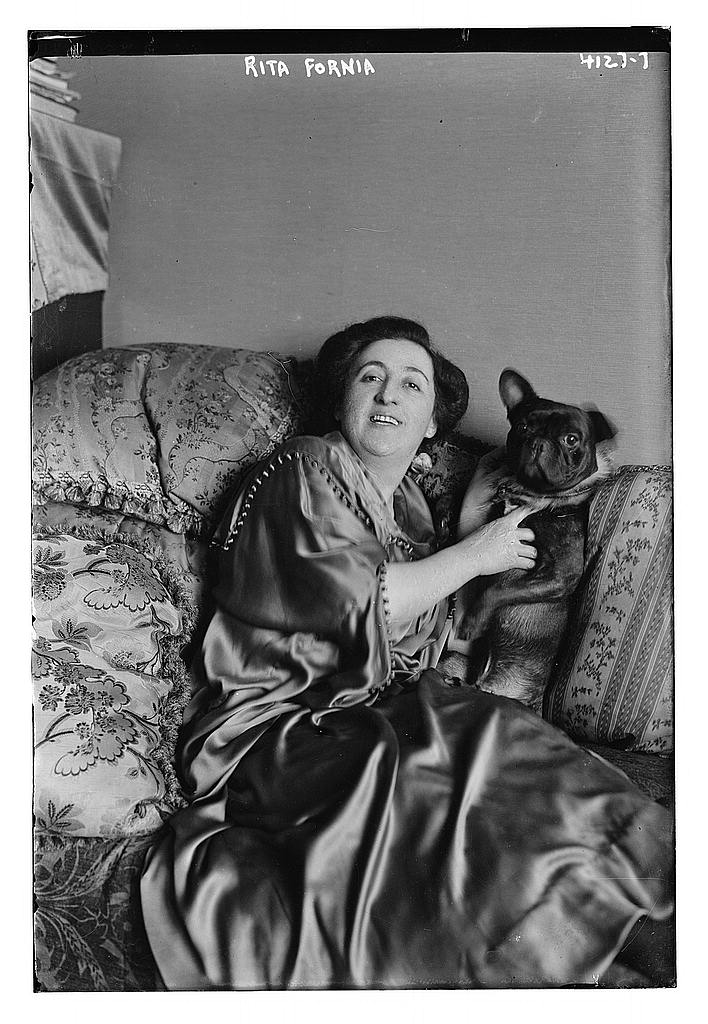
Rita Fornia in 1916 at her home

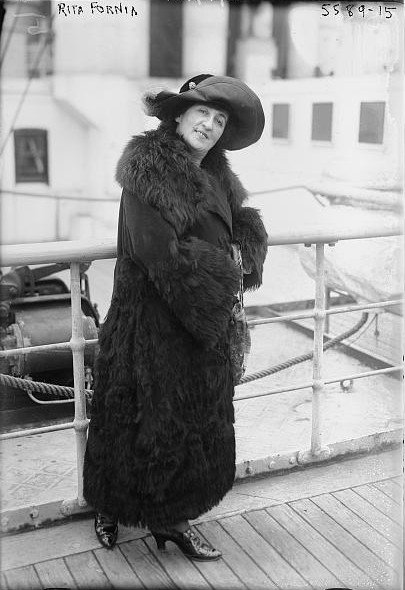
Rita Fornia photographed in 1915

Rita Fornia (17 July 1878 – 27 October 1922) was an American soprano, later mezzo-soprano. She began her career in Europe at the beginning of the 20th century singing coloratura soprano roles. Early on in her career her voice darkened and dropped slightly causing her to focus more within the mezzo-soprano repertoire while still singing some soprano roles. She joined the Metropolitan Opera company in 1907 where she performed regularly in mostly supporting roles until her retirement in 1922. She is best remembered today for portraying the role of the Abbess in the world premiere of Puccini's Suor Angelica in 1918.

== Career ==
Fornia was born in San Francisco, California as Regina Newman on 17 July 1878. Her parents were immigrants from Prussia and her father owned a successful business as a wholesale jeweller. At the age of 12, she attended Adelina Patti's 1890 concert in San Francisco which inspired her to become an opera singer. Her father eventually allowed her to move to New York City in 1898 to pursue her desire.

While in New York, Fornia studied with Emil Fischer and Sofia Scalchi in New York City and then, under Fischer's advice, moved to Berlin in 1899 to study with Selma Nicklass-Kempner. Kempner, later the teacher of Frieda Hempel, trained her as a coloratura soprano. She made her professional début with the Hamburg State Opera in 1901 as Eudoxie in Halévy's La Juive. Over the next two years she sang mostly coloratura soprano roles in Germany and France, largely with the Hamburg State Opera who offered her a contract. Her other roles in Hamburg included Rosina in The Barber of Seville and the Queen of the Night in The Magic Flute. From the Fall of 1902 through the summer of 1903 she studied with Jean de Reszke in Paris. Reszke was convinced the Fornia was actually a mezzo-soprano and trained her voice accordingly. Under Reszke's recommendation to Henry Savage, Fornia returned to America in August 1903 to join the Savage English Grand Opera Company where she sang both mezzo-soprano and soprano roles until 1906. Her first performance with the company was as Siébel in Charles Gounod's Faust at the Brooklyn Academy of Music on 21 September 1903. Her other roles with Savage's company included Musetta in Giacomo Puccini's La bohème, Nedda in Pagliacci, Santuzza in Cavalleria rusticana, both Brünnhilde and Sieglinde in The Valkyrie, both Elisabeth and Venus in Wagner's Tannhäuser, and both Leonora and Azucena in Verdi's Il trovatore.

In 1907 Heinrich Conried hired Fornia to join the roster at the Metropolitan Opera for the 1907–1908 season. Her first performance with the company was as the Geisha in Mascagni's Iris on December 6, 1907, where her name was billed as Rita Fornia for the first time. She notably sang with Geraldine Farrar and Enrico Caruso in a performance of Faust for the opening of the new Brooklyn Academy of Music in 1908. Also of interest during this season was her last minute replacement of an ailing Emma Eames as Leonora in Il trovatore in March 1908 which caused a sensation among New York audiences. The New York American reported the following about her performance:

To the amazement of those who had not heard the singer in important parts, Mme. La Fornia made a pronounced and brilliant hit. Though she had had no rehearsal, she sang admirably. In the dramatic passages she had power, and suggested passion. In her florid music, she had taste, charm, and remarkable facility. Her voice is fresh and of a delightful quality. She acts intelligently. And she is handsome. Why has the Metropolitan management kept a singer of Mme. La Fornia’s caliber in the background all these months?

On May 22, 1909, in Manhattan, New York City, Fornia married James P. Labey, a New York art dealer, with whom she enjoyed a happy marriage.

The success of this first season led Conried to offer Fornia a lengthy contract and she continued to perform with the company through 1922. She sang in more than 400 performances with the Metropolitan Opera, where she occasionally performed leading roles but more frequently was heard in a wide range of smaller supporting parts. Musicologist and biographer Mary Watkins Cushing said the following about Fornia's career with the company:

In the period of opera which included many of the greatest singers the Metropolitan has ever known, Madame Fornia did not stand out, although she was gifted with an excellent and useful voice, artistic stamina, and a kindly and accommodating disposition. Were she a member of the company today, she would doubtless be considered a top-flight singer. She was, during her time, an invaluable asset; the sort of hard-working, uninspired, but competent artist every company needs……She was a pleasant, fairly placid woman, of no great personal distinction either on or off the scene. She was, in short, not the material of which the so-called stars of the musical world are made, but she was beyond all doubt a first-rate example of what the Europeans call a routinière.

Most notably, Fornia created the parts of Enya in the original 1912 production of Horatio Parker's Mona, Giulia in the original 1915 production of Umberto Giordano's Madame Sans-Gêne and the Abbess in the original 1918 production of Puccini's Suor Angelica. Her other roles with the company included Amarante in La fille de Madame Angot, Barbarina in Le Nozze di Figaro, Donna Elvira in Don Giovanni, Eleanora in Le Donne Curiose, Eurydice in Monteverdi's Orfeo, Flowermaiden in Parsifal, Frasquita in Carmen, Geltrude in Il maestro di cappella, Gertrud in Hänsel und Gretel, Giulietta in Les Contes d'Hoffmann, Gutrune in Götterdämmerung, Helmwige in Die Walküre, the Innkeeper's Daughter in Königskinder, Leonora in Il Trovatore, Marianne in Der Rosenkavalier, Marzelline in Fidelio, Nedda in Pagliacci, Pepa in Tiefland, Poussette in Manon, the Priestess in Aida, Rosina in Il Barbiere di Siviglia, Santuzza in Cavalleria Rusticana, the Second Lady in Die Zauberflöte, the Shepherd in Tannhäuser, Siebel in Faust, Stéphano in Roméo et Juliette, and Wellgunde in Das Rheingold among others. Her last performance at the Met was in her most celebrated role, Suzuki in Madama Butterfly, on April 7, 1922.

According to her friend and colleague, renowned singer Geraldine Farrar, Fornia began experiencing health problems in 1915. Her retirement in 1922 seems likely to have been related to her health as she underwent an operation in New York not too long after her last stage appearance.

She died six months after her retirement, during a visit to her sister's home in Paris on October 27, 1922. The funeral service was held at the Anglican, or Episcopalian, Church of St George in la Rue Auguste-Vacquerie, Paris, on November 2. Her widower survived her by exactly 24 years before his death at the West Side Hospital, New York at the age of 74 on October 26, 1946.

== Recordings ==
Fornia was among the first generation of musicians to be recorded. Her few recordings were all made by the Victor Talking Machine Company. Among the recordings she left are trio from Madama Butterfly ("Lo so che alle sue pene") with Antonio Scotti and Riccardo Martin, Stéphano's aria ("Que fais-tu, blanche tourterelle") from Roméo et Juliette, Siebel's aria ("Faites-lui mes aveux") from Faust, and a number of French and German art songs. Marston Records has recently released a number of these recordings on CD.

== Sources ==
- J.B. Steane: "Rita Fornia", Grove Music Online ed. L. Macy (Accessed November 14, 2008), (subscription access)
- Rita Fornia biography from Operissimo.com (In German)
- Metropolitan Opera Archives
