= The Pipe of Desire =

1906 opera by Frederick Converse

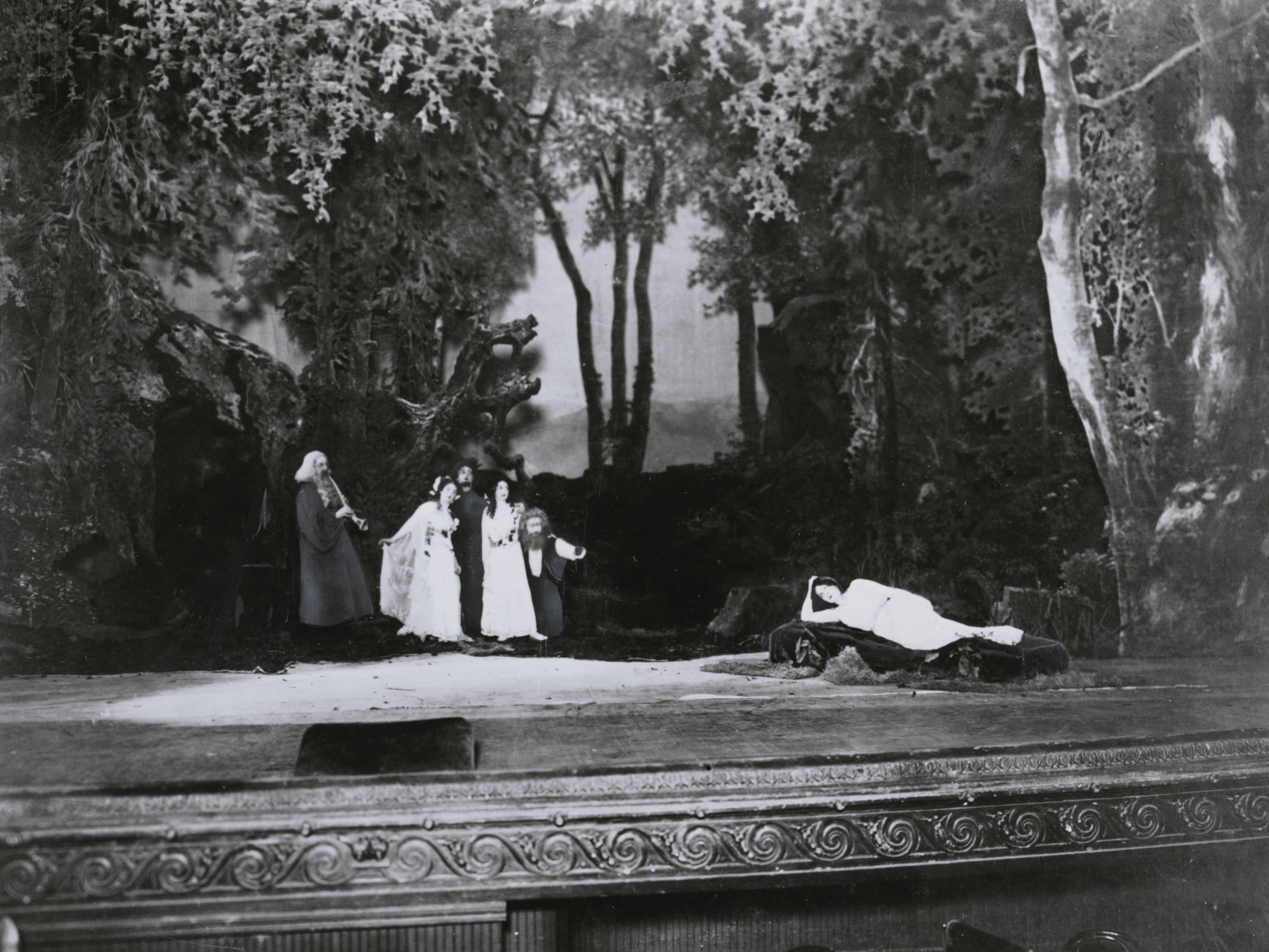
Scene from the Metropolitan Opera production, 1910

The Pipe of Desire is a one-act opera by Frederick Shepherd Converse to a libretto by George Edward Barton. Written in 1906, it is remembered today, if at all, as the first English-language opera, and the first opera by an American composer, presented by the Metropolitan Opera, where it was first shown on March 18, 1910.

== Performance history ==
The Pipe of Desire was given its premiere at Jordan Hall in Boston on January 31, 1906, with a further performance on February 2. The undertaking was largely an amateur affair, and it was said that there was some difficulty, between an inadequate stage apparatus and some troubles with the costuming, in achieving the creators' ultimate vision for the piece. George Dean sang the role of Iolan to the Naoia of Bertha Cushing Child; Stephen Townsend sang the Old One, with Alice Rice as the Sylph. Mabel Stanaway sang Undine, Richard Tobin the Salamander, and Ralph Osborne the Gnome. The chorus was drawn from the student body of the New England Conservatory of Music. The orchestra, led by Wallace Goodrich, was made up of musicians from the Boston Symphony Orchestra. Ignaz Gaugengigl designed the scenery and costumes.

The Boston Opera Company gave the professional premiere of the work on January 6, 1910, at the Boston Opera House; it was the company's first performance of any work in English. Riccardo Martin was the Iolan, to the Naoia of Fely Dereyne. Ramon Blanchart was the Old One, and Bernice Fisher was the Sylph. Undine was played by Jeska Swarts, the Salamander by C. Stroesco, and the Gnome by Rodolfo Fornari. Once more, Wallace Goodrich conducted. The composer received an ovation after the performance.

An edition of the score of The Pipe of Desire was published overseas, making it among the earliest American operas so honored.

=== Metropolitan Opera ===
When Giulio Gatti-Casazza became general manager of the Metropolitan Opera, among the goals which he set for himself was "to discover some good American operas which I could produce and maintain in the repertoire." To that end, he proposed to the board of directors that the company hold a contest, open only to American composers, the winner of which would receive a prize of $10,000 and a Metropolitan performance of his opera; this would ultimately be won by Horatio Parker and his opera Mona. Even before the contest could be put together, however, Gatti-Casazza received word that The Pipe of Desire had recently been given a semi-professional reading in Boston, and he hurried there to sign Converse to a contract with the New York company.

The Pipe of Desire was first performed at the Metropolitan on March 18, 1910, on a double bill with Pagliacci. The role of Naoia was taken by Louise Homer, while Riccardo Martin reprised his performance as Iolan; the Old One was performed by Clarence Whitehill, and the Sylph by Lenora Sparkes. Lillia Snelling sang the role of Undine, and Glenn Hall that of the Salamander, with Herbert Witherspoon as the Gnome. The conductor was Alfred Hertz. The opera was presented twice more during the season – once on a bill with Cavalleria rusticana and a ballet divertissement by Anna Pavlova and Mikhail Mordkin, and once on a program with two dance items, including another performance by Pavlova and Mordkin – but was dropped from the repertory thereafter.

== Plot ==
Adapted from and

Elves are seen in the forest, preparing for the beginning of spring. They hear the approach of the peasant Iolan, who is to be married to Naoia on the following day. Iolan has always been kind to the elves, and they argue among themselves as to whether or not they should present themselves to him to give him thanks. Such an act is contrary to the ancient laws; nevertheless, they decide to appear to Iolan, an act for which their King, the Old One, scolds them. Iolan, who has invited the elves to his wedding, does not believe that the Old One is their king, and cannot understand his hostility. In response, the King tells him of his magical pipe, a story which does not impress the peasant. The elves, however, demand that their leader play on the instrument, as the old laws so allow on the first day of spring.

The king begins to play, causing the elves to dance; Iolan remains unimpressed, so the Old One forces him, through the magic of the pipe, to dance as well. At this Iolan is furious and seizes the instrument; he is warned, however, against playing it, as it is the pipe which was given to Lilith by God, and was cursed by Him after the fall of Man. Nevertheless Iolan begins to play a tune, which leads him to experience a vision of his dearest wish; his farm will be fruitful, and he and Naoia will have children. He calls to her to come to him, but the Old One takes the instrument back, telling the young man that he has been shown, by its agency, his heart's desire, which has helped to rule the world. The king himself now plays upon the pipe, and Iolan receives another vision: Naoioa is ill, but obeying the command of the instrument, rises and runs through the forest to find her beloved. When she appears she is in a poor state, and Iolan regrets that his actions have led to her suffering. Naoia says that it was the wind that told her to come. The couple pledge themselves to each other for eternity, but Naoia is too ill and weak to continue, and collapses in the arms of her beloved. She sees visions of their future home, and of their old age; then, with a cry to the young peasant, she dies.

With the death of his sweetheart, Iolan curses God and throws away his new riches, but the king reminds him that he is to blame for Naoia's death, having caused it with his performance upon the pipe. Iolan prepares to attack the Old One, but chooses instead to forgive him, knowing that to be the course that Naoia would have taken. The change, and Iolan's purification, astonish the elves. Once more their king plays on the pipe, this time the song of autumn, and Iolan lies down and dies. The elves ask their king: what happens to those that die too young? "Nothing is wasted", he tells them, and the opera ends.

== Reception ==
Writing in her diary the day after The Pipe of Desire premiered, Converse's wife noted that critics "were all enthusiastic about the opera and almost none liked the text." Looking back upon the same performance two years later, Philip Hale praised the work highly; he expressed some reservations about the libretto, but said that "the music still haunts the memory", and expressed a desire to hear the piece again. Olin Downes, too, praised the work highly in advance of its Metropolitan Opera premiere, producing an extensive analysis of the score for The New Music Review. Regarding the performances in New York, critical reaction was largely negative. Writing for The New York Sun, William James Henderson described what he saw as the work's chief flaw:

But as a stage subject the story is not at all potent. The book certainly furnishes opportunity for picturesque groupings of nymphs and gnomes, for beautiful effects of light and shadow, for an exquisite woodland scene, admirably provided at the Metropolitan, and for moods not unsuited to the language of music.

But there is nothing in the employment of details to clamor for musical utterance. In fact the text is seldom poetic in thought or melodious in technic. Many of the lines are hostile to lyric song and many are awkward in themselves even when considered merely as pieces of English.

He stated further that Converse did not appear to have been inspired by the text, and that the piece "lacks throughout the distinctness of theatrical utterance".

Later reviewers have been no kinder to the opera. Irving Kolodin, in The Story of the Metropolitan Opera, 1883–1950: A Candid History, notes that the cast were almost all native speakers of English, but that their singing was unintelligible, a fact which he lays at the feet of the music and not the performers; he also quotes a review that describes the text as "hopeless". John Briggs, writing in a later history of the company, described the work as "an immediate and decisive failure from which Gatti derived little except the satisfaction of having done his duty". Ultimately Kolodin assesses The Pipe of Desire, alongside Le villi, La Wally, Germania, and Alessandro Stradella, as among the "dubious ventures" of Gatti-Casazza's tenure.

Converse received the Bispham Memorial Medal Award for The Pipe of Desire in 1926.
