= Albert Reiss =

German operatic tenor

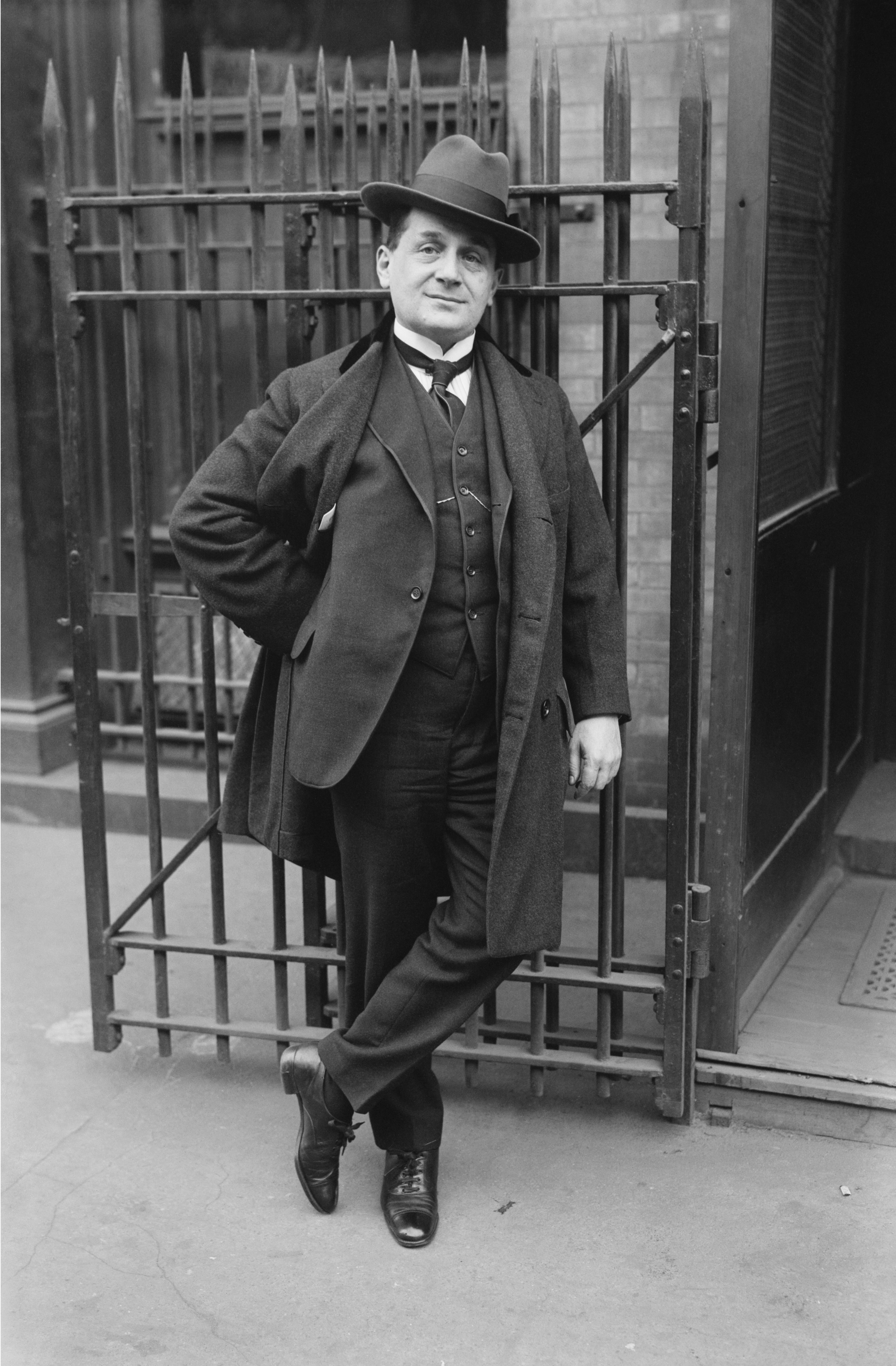
Reiss at the stage entrance of the Metropolitan Opera, c. 1910

Albert Reiss also Albert Reiß (22 February 1870 – 19 June 1940) was a German operatic tenor who had a prolific career in Europe and the United States. He spent much of his career performing at the Metropolitan Opera where he sang in more than 1,000 performances, including several premieres, between 1901 and 1919. Excelling in the tenor buffo repertoire, Reiss was particularly associated with the roles of David in Wagner's Die Meistersinger von Nürnberg and Mime in Der Ring des Nibelungen, two roles he sang in numerous houses internationally.

== Life ==
=== Early life and career ===
Reiss was born in Berlin and began his career as an actor. He appeared in several plays in Berlin and Strasbourg before deciding to pursue an operatic career under the encouragement of Bernhard Pollini and Ernestine Schumann-Heink. He proceeded to study singing with Wilhelm Vilmar and later Julius Lieben and Benno Stolzenberg. He made his professional operatic debut in 1897 as Peter Ivanov in Lortzing's Zar und Zimmermann at Königsberg. The following year he joined the opera house at Posen where he sang roles for only one season. In 1899 he began performing at the Wiesbaden Opera House where he performed roles until the fall of 1901 when he left to join the roster at the Metropolitan Opera.

=== Mid to late career ===
Reiss began his association with the Met touring throughout North America from October–December 1901. His first performance with the company was in Toronto on 12 October as Remendado in Bizet's Carmen. He made his first appearance at the company's house in New York City on December 23, 1901, as both the Shepherd and the Steersman in Wagner's Tristan und Isolde. This was the beginning of a long association with the Met for Reiss, who appeared with the company every year for the next eighteen years in mostly tenor buffo roles.

Most notably he sang in several world premiers with the company including: Nick in Puccini's La fanciulla del West, the Broom-maker in Humperdinck's Königskinder, Nial in Horatio Parker's Mona, the offstage male lover in Puccini's Il Tabarro, Richard II of England in Reginald de Koven's The Canterbury Pilgrims and Ragueneau in Walter Damrosch's Cyrano. His farewell performance on 14 April 1919 – again as Remendado – was his 1,070th performance with the company.

In addition to performances with the Met, Reiss returned periodically to Europe to appear in operas. From 1902 to 1907 he sang in several productions at the Bavarian State Opera. He also sang at the Hamburg State Opera (1904) and the Palais Garnier (1910). Reiss made his only other American appearances with the Chicago Grand Opera Company in 1911 and 1912. He appeared at the Royal Opera House in London at various times between 1902–1905 and 1924–1929, where he sang the roles of Valzacchi in Der Rosenkavalier, Mime in Der Ring des Nibelungen and David in Die Meistersinger von Nürnberg. After leaving the Met, he sang at the Volksoper Berlin (1923–25) and Berlin State Opera (1925–1930).

Upon retiring from the stage in 1930, Reiss resettled in Nice, France, where he lived until his death in 1940.
