= Louise Homer =

American operatic contralto (1871–1947)

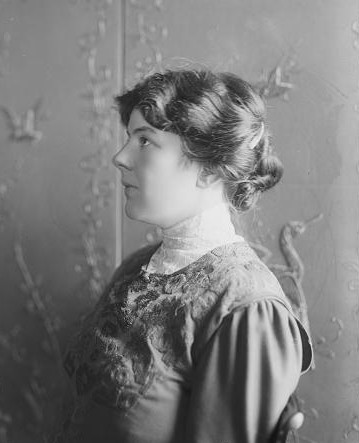
- Born: Louise Dilworth Beatty; April 30, 1871; Pittsburgh, Pennsylvania
- Died: May 6, 1947 (aged 76); Winter Park, Florida
- Known for: Metropolitan Opera
- Spouse: Sidney Homer (m. 1895; died 1947)
- Children: Anne Homer, Kathryn Homer, Sidney Homer Jr, Helen Homer, Louise Homer, Hester Homer,

Louise Beatty Homer (April 30, 1871 – May 6, 1947) was an American operatic dramatic contralto who had an active international career in concert halls and opera houses from 1895 until her retirement in 1932.

After a brief stint as a vaudeville entertainer in New England, she made her professional opera debut in France in 1898. She then became a member of the Metropolitan Opera from 1900 to 1919 and again from 1927 to 1929. She was also active as an opera singer in Boston, Chicago, and California. She recorded extensively for Victor Records and Columbia Records in the early decades of the 20th century. She was married to composer Sidney Homer for 52 years. The composer Samuel Barber was her nephew.

Homer sang a broad repertoire which encompassed works from the French, German, and Italian repertoires. She enjoyed particular success in the operas of Giuseppe Verdi and Richard Wagner. She often stated in interviews that her favorite role to perform was Amneris in Verdi's Aida. At the Met she sang in several United States premieres and created roles in two world premieres: the witch in Engelbert Humperdinck's Königskinder and the title role in Horatio Parker's Mona. Soprano Nellie Melba once hailed her as "the world's most beautiful voice". In 1923 and 1924 she was listed as one of the 12 greatest living women by the National League of Women Voters.

== Early life and career ==
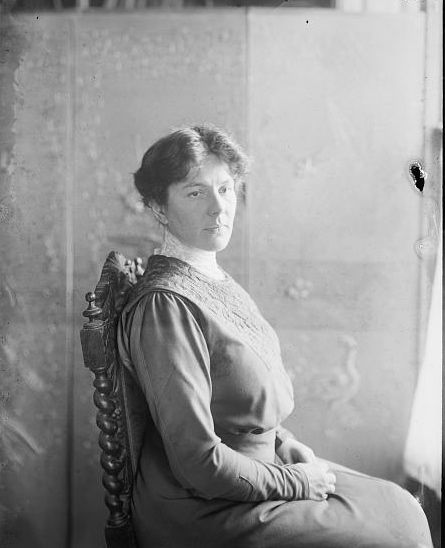
Louise Homer early in her career

Homer was born Louise Dilworth Beatty in Pittsburgh, Pennsylvania, on April 30, 1871. Her father, Reverend William Trimble Beatty, was a Presbyterian minister who founded Pennsylvania Female College (now Chatham University). Her father initially expressed concerns over his daughter's desired singing career for religious reasons, believing that such gifts were meant solely for worship within the church. However, Louise was eventually able to convince her father that she could employ her vocal gifts outside of the church without being in sin, at which point she was given permission to pursue a musical education. She began her vocal training in Philadelphia, but ultimately ended up in Boston.

In Boston Homer met composer Sidney Homer whom she married in 1895. They remained married until her death more than five decades later and had six children together, including authors Joy Homer and Anne Homer, as well as Louise Homer, a soprano. Just months before her marriage, Homer made her stage debut in January 1895 in a vaudeville production at Keith's Opera House in Providence, Rhode Island. The following February she appeared at the Bijou Opera House in Boston in the vaudeville show Our Uncle Dudley in a cast which also included Broadway star Marie Cahill and silent film actor and director Frank Currier. While further honing her craft, she spent the next few years performing periodically at functions organized by members of the elite society of Boston.

In 1898 Homer went to France to pursue studies in Paris with Fidèle König and Paul Lhérie. She made her professional operatic debut as Léonor in Donizetti's La favorite at Vichy in 1898. The following year she performed at the Royal Opera House in London before going to Brussels where she was engaged at the Théâtre Royal de la Monnaie for eight months.

== Homer at the Met ==
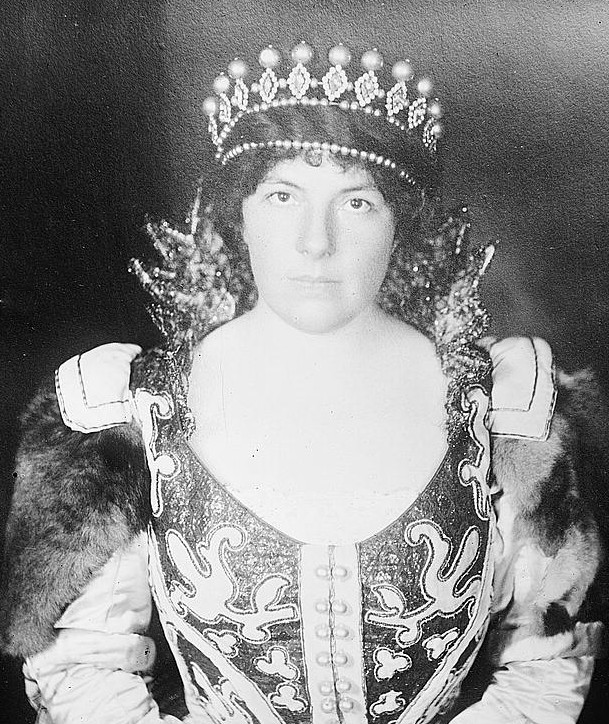
Louise Homer, on March 19, 1913, as Marina in Boris Godunov

Homer made her American opera debut at the Metropolitan Opera in New York City in 1900 singing Amneris in Verdi's Aida.

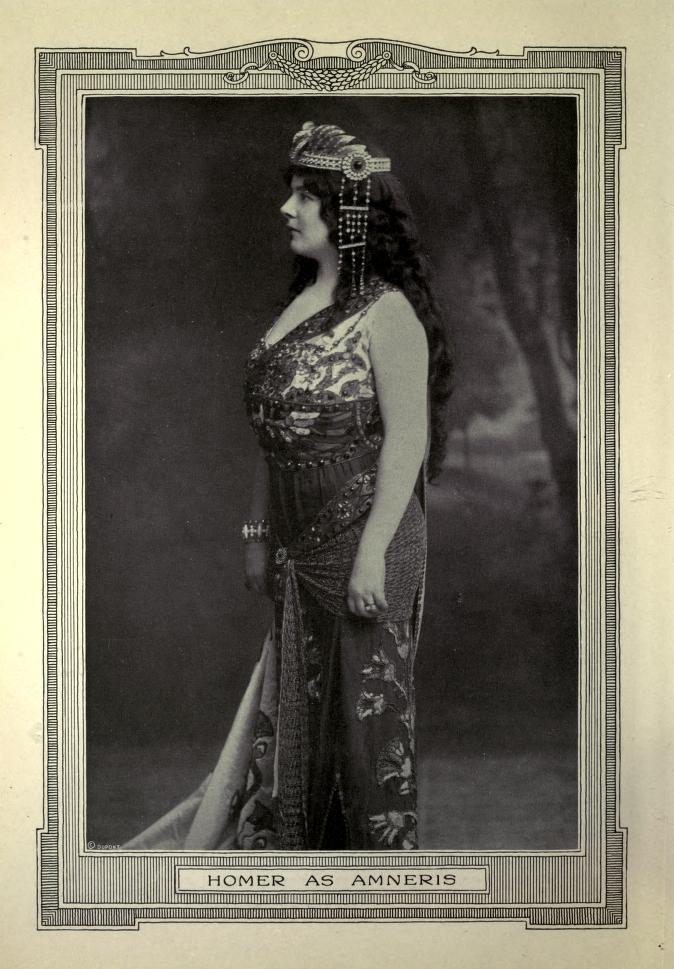
Louise Homer as Amneris in Aida

She sang at the Met for 19 consecutive seasons, often singing opposite such acclaimed singers as Enrico Caruso, Geraldine Farrar, and Ernestine Schumann-Heink. At the Met, she created roles in two world premieres: the witch in Engelbert Humperdinck's Königskinder (1910) and the title role in Horatio Parker's Mona (1912). She also sang in the American premieres of Ignacy Jan Paderewski's Manru (1902, Hedwig), Richard Wagner's Parsifal (1903, the Voice from Above), Christoph Willibald Gluck's Armide (1910, Hate), and Mussorgsky's Boris Godunov (1913, as Marina with Arturo Toscanini conducting). She also sang Suzuki in the Met premiere of Puccini's Madama Butterfly in the presence of the composer on February 11, 1907. She left the Met at the end of March 1919, but returned to the company in late 1927.

Homer sang a varied repertoire at the Met which encompassed parts from a variety of musical periods and languages. Some of the many roles she appeared in on the Met stage were Azucena in Il trovatore, Brangäne in Tristan und Isolde, Dalila in Samson and Delilah, Emilia in Otello, Erda in Siegfried, Fidès in Le prophète, both Flosshilde and Waltraute in Götterdämmerung, both Fricka and Schwertleite in Die Walküre, (Note: Homer sometimes sang the part of Schwertleite under the assumed names of Miss Remi of L. Lawrence. She appeared as Lucile Lawrence in an open-air performance of Verdi's Requiem at the Polo Grounds, New York conducted by Louis Koemmenich in 1916.) Laura in La Gioconda, Lola in Cavalleria rusticana, Maddalena in Rigoletto, Magdalene in Die Meistersinger von Nürnberg, Marguerite in La dame blanche, both Marta and Pantalis in Mefistofele, Mistress Quickly in Falstaff, Nancy in Martha, Naoia in Frederick Converse's The Pipe of Desire, Orfeo in Orfeo ed Euridice, Ortrud in Lohengrin, the Second Lady in The Magic Flute, Siebel in Faust, Urbain in Les Huguenots, Ulrica in Un ballo in maschera, Venus in Tannhäuser, and the Witch in Hansel and Gretel. She also sang in numerous concerts at the Met, including as a soloist in performances of Handel's Messiah, Rossini's Stabat Mater, and Verdi's Requiem. Her last performance with the company was as Amneris in November 1929. Homer retired from the stage in 1932.

== Other work ==
"Bella figlia dell'amore"

While performing at the Met, Homer was concurrently a member of the Boston Opera Company (BOC) from 1909 to 1915. She notably performed La Cieca in the BOC's inaugural production of La Gioconda on November 8, 1909 with Lillian Nordica in the title role; a production which also marked the grand opening of the Boston Opera House. She was later a member of the Chicago Civic Opera from 1922 to 1931. In 1926 she sang the role of Delilah in Camille Saint-Saëns's Samson and Delilah at the San Francisco Opera and also sang in several productions in Los Angeles during the 1920s.

Madame Louise Homer, together with her daughter Louise Homer Jnr, sang a repertoire of duets and recorded several hymns for Victor records, including O' Morning Land, Sabbat Mater, my Ain Countrie & more. Miss Louise Homer Jnr, a lyric soprano voice with unusual purity of tone made her solo debut in 1917 at the academy of music, Philadelphia and sang at a joint concert with her mother in 1921 in Carnegie Hall. Louise Homer's daughter Kay (Katherine, or Kat) had studied music in New York and was a fine pianist. In 1926, at the age of 19 years, Kay Homer toured with her mother Madame Louise Homer playing piano accompanyment at her mother's concerts and also handling the travel arrangements & consultation responsibilities for the same. Louise Homer Jnr would also perform together at some of these recitals.

Louise Homer recorded several Christian hymns in duet with Alma Gluck, among them "Rock of Ages," "Whispering Hope," "One Sweetly Solemn Thought," and "Jesus, Lover of My Soul."

== Death ==
Homer died of a heart ailment on May 6, 1947, at the age of 76 in Winter Park, Florida, after five weeks of ill health. She and her husband had moved to Winter Park eight years previously.

== Sources ==
- Cantabile Subito, "Homer, Louise"
- Metropolitan Opera Performance record: Homer, Louise (Mezzo Soprano), MetOpera Database
