= Corviglia Ski Club =

Snow sports club in Corviglia, Switzerland

The Corviglia Ski Club is a recreational snow sports club located in Corviglia, Switzerland. It was founded in 1930 by European aristocrats and is one of the oldest and most famous private members club in the world - exclusively for the rich and the famous.

== History ==
The Corviglia Ski Club was created on 1930. Founder members included:

- Coco Chanel
- Jacques Cartier
- Philippe de Rothschild

== Presidents ==
- Teofilo Guiscardo Rossi di Montelera until 1987
- Prince Constantin of Liechtenstein (1987–1991)
- Marco Alliata Nobili (1991–1995)
- Principe Augusto Ruffo di Calabria dei Principi di Scilla from 1995.

== Notable members ==
- Aga Khan IV, magnate
- Rainier III, Prince of Monaco
- Gianni Agnelli, Italian industrialist and politician
- Umberto Agnelli, Italian industrialist and politician
- Hans Heinrich Thyssen-Bornemisza, industrialist and art collector
- Aristotle Onassis, industrialist
- Freddy Heineken, Dutch businessman (beer magnate)
- Prince Alexander of Yugoslavia
- Norman Butler, polo player
- Frank Jay Gould, philanthropist
- Herbert von Karajan, Austrian conductor.
- Harry Hays Morgan Jr., American diplomat
- Emilio Pucci, Italian fashion designer and politician
- Philippe de Rothschild,
- Jacobo Fitz-James Stuart, 17th Duke of Alba
- Stavros Niarchos, Greek shipping tycoon
- John Spencer-Churchill, 11th Duke of Marlborough
- Alfonso, Duke of Anjou and Cádiz
- Prince Constantin of Liechtenstein
- Lord Norman Foster of Thames Bank OM
- Riccardo di Sangro e di Martina
