= Dr. Richard Thornton House =

Historic house in Virginia, United States

- U.S. National Register of Historic Places
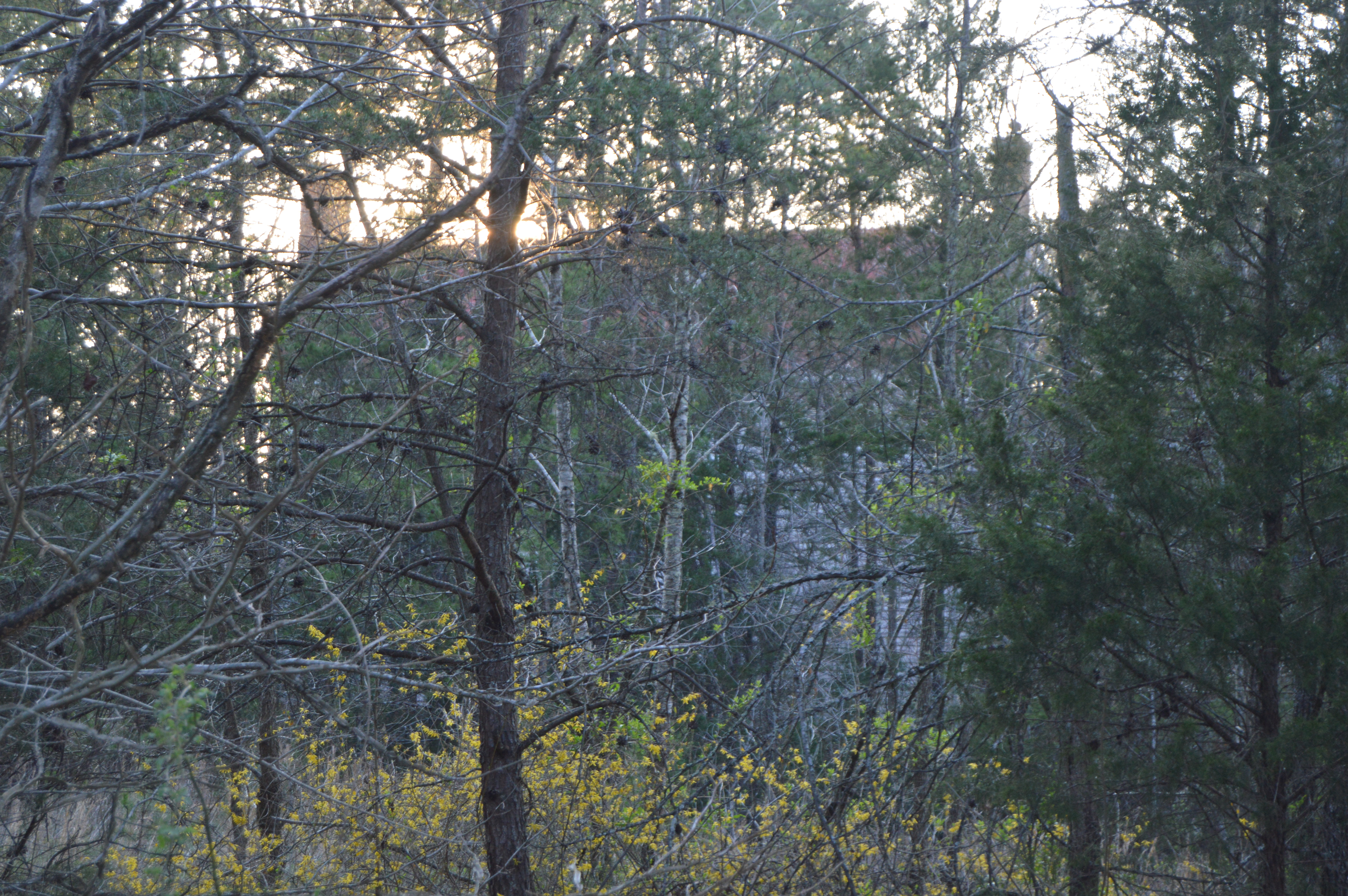
- Front of the house, seen through surrounding trees

- Location within Virginia
- Location: Golden Leaf and Tobacco Roads
- Nearest city: Nathalie, Virginia
- Coordinates: 36.9772°N 79.0328°W
- Area: 30 acres (12 ha)
- Built: 1818
- Architectural style: Federal
- NRHP reference No.: 12000987
- Added to NRHP: November 28, 2012

Dr. Richard Thornton House is a historic physician's residence and farm located in Halifax County, Virginia, United States. The residence was constructed in 1818 by Dr. Richard Thornton, a physician and grandson of William Thornton of Brunswick, a Colonial politician and wealthy land owner.

== History ==
The Dr. Richard Thornton House was constructed circa 1818 by a wealthy local physician, Richard Thornton. Thornton was born in 1786 to Lt. Francis Thornton of 'Rolling Hill' in Charlotte County, Virginia. By 1810, Thornton had established a medical practice and farm in Halifax County, Virginia. Thornton began construction of the current residence in 1818 with no known significant alterations made to the main house during his lifetime. The house is noted for a peculiar internal division believed to have been created to provide lodging for medical students. By Thornton's death in 1860, the property held nearly 40 slaves and produced the largest quantity of tobacco in the local area. The property was taken over by his nephew, Dr. John Lemuel Thornton, whose heirs sold the property to the Marshall family in 1889. The house remained in the Marshall family until 1983. In 1984, the house and land were sold to the Smith family, who hold the land today in a private corporation. The house has been abandoned since the Marshall sale and has recently been secured for protection from vandals.
