= Anne Homer =

American writer (1907–1995)

- Born: November 15, 1907; New Jersey, US
- Died: May 16, 1995 (aged 87); Morristown, New Jersey, US
- Education: Smith College
- Spouse: William Main Doerflinger
- Parent(s): Sidney Homer; Louise Dilworth Beatty

Anne Homer Doerflinger (November 15, 1907 – May 16, 1995) was an American writer who is best known for her short works of fiction. She published more than 100 short stories in magazines such as Good Housekeeping, The Ladies Home Journal, Mademoiselle, and The Saturday Evening Post, among others.

== Biography ==
Homer was born on October 15, 1907, in New Jersey, the daughter of Sidney and Louise Homer. In 1929, she graduated drom Smith College. She later penned a biography on her mother: Louise Homer and the Golden Age of Opera (1974, William Morrow and Company).

Homer's sister was author Joy Homer, who died from illness. Joy was married to editor William Main Doerflinger; together they had a daughter, Katherine. Anne took care of her sister and her family through the years illness, and following Joy's death, became William's second wife. Anne and William had four children of their own together.

Homer lived in Convent Station, New Jersey. Homer died on May 16, 1995, aged 87, from cancer, at Morristown Memorial Hospital, in Morristown, New Jersey.
