= Thomas Wood Stevens =

American artist, poet, writer and theatre director

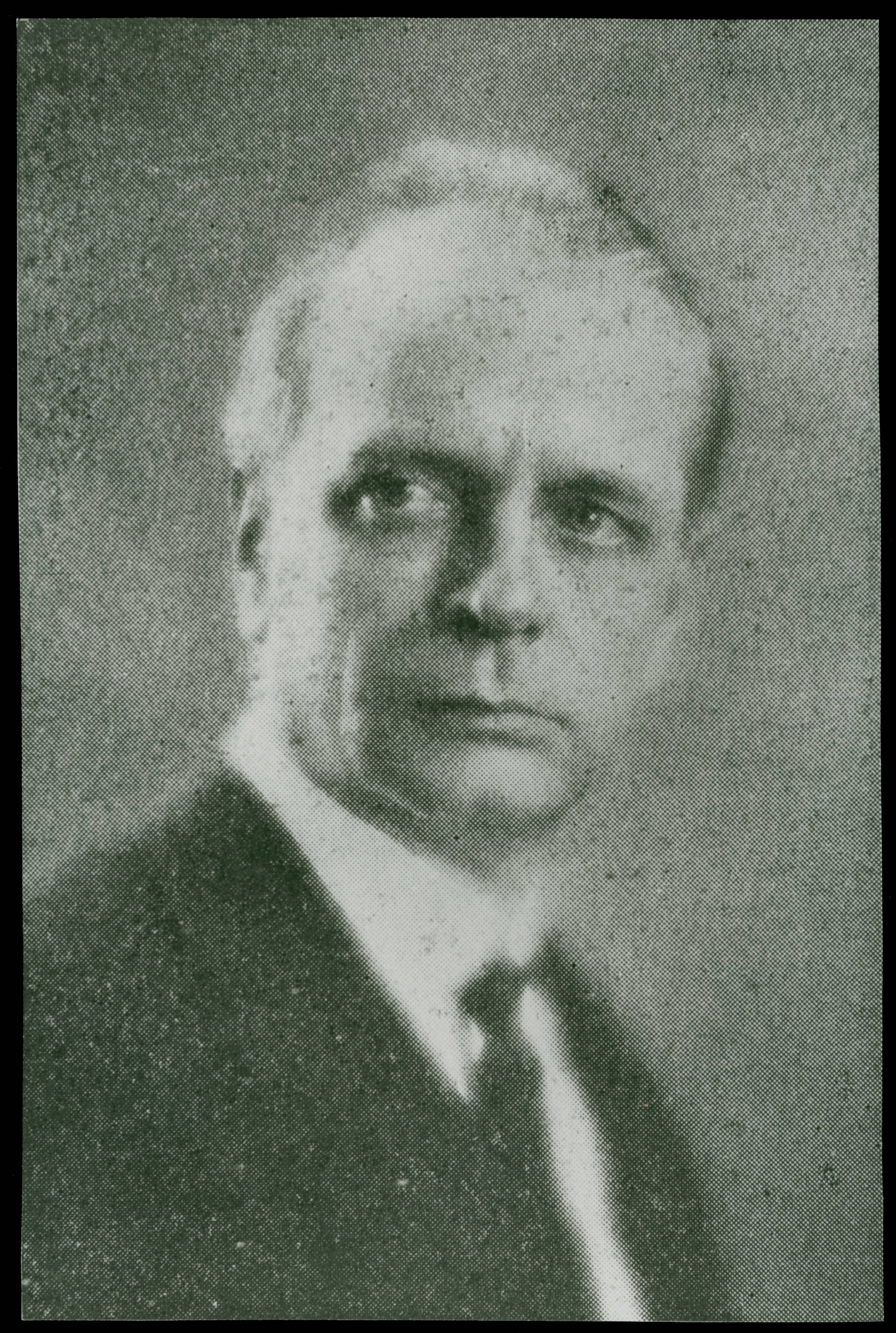
Thomas Wood Stevens

Thomas Wood Stevens (born Daysville, Illinois, January 26, 1880; died Tucson, Arizona, January 29, 1942) was an American artist, poet, writer, and theatre director. He is perhaps best known for creating the first American degree-granting college theatre department.

== Early life ==
Stevens' father William Gurney Stevens (1824–1899) was a merchant in Dixon, Illinois and then a farmer in rural Daysville. His mother was Charlotte (Wood) Stevens (1837–1899). His mother and later his sister Lonne (1862–1947) read classics and Shakespeare to him. In 1893 his family moved to Chicago and he attended the Armour Scientific Academy followed by the Armour Institute of Technology. He also took classes at the Art Institute of Chicago and became increasingly interested in art and literature. Facing financial pressures after the death of his parents in 1899, Stevens left the Armour Institute in 1900.

== Printing ==
Stevens had become interested in printing and was inspired by visits to the rare books collection of the Newberry Library. He purchased type and started Blue Sky Press, which published books and the Blue Sky magazine. Stevens published classics, works by fellow students, and works by authors in the Chicago literary scene and elsewhere, including Elia W. Peattie, Forrest Crissey, Payne Erskine, and Martha Foote Crow. For a time Stevens worked in the advertising department of the Santa Fe Railroad to support himself, but later was able to support himself with his press and book design work. Blue Sky Press was active until 1906.

== Art ==
Starting in 1901 Stevens was part of the "Little Room", the group of artists and writers who met at the studio of Ralph Elmer Clarkson. This group included figures such as Lorado Taft, Oliver Dennett Grover, Edith Wyatt, and Hamlin Garland. In 1902 he became the literary critic for The Inland Printer. From 1903 to 1913 Stevens taught classes such as lettering, illustration, and mural decoration at the Chicago Art Institute. In 1906 he travelled to England to study under artist and designer Frank Brangwyn; he later studied briefly with painter Joaquín Sorolla. Stevens began to exhibit etchings about 1907 and helped set up the Chicago Society of Etchers; he served as president for a time and wrote the first book published by the Society, The Etching of Cities (1913).

== Theatre ==
Around 1908 Stevens began to pursue theatre more seriously. His first serious play was The Chaplet of Pan, written with Wallace Rice around 1908; it was copyrighted in 1912. In 1909 Stevens wrote and produced The Pageant of the Italian Renaissance at the Chicago Art Institute; this led to his involvement in a series of pageants leading up to the massive Pageant of Saint Louis produced in St. Louis in 1914. He continued to write and produce pageants as long as they remained popular, including one for the Missouri Centennial in 1921, a series of pageants at Yorktown in 1931, and the Old Fort Niagara Pageant in 1934.

Stevens was invited by the Carnegie Institute of Technology in Pittsburgh to start a school of stagecraft there, but he persuaded them instead to broaden it to a school of theatre arts. When it was organized in 1913 with Stevens as department head it became the first degree-granting school of drama in the United States. Stevens developed the curriculum, hired the faculty, and directed many of the student productions. He remained the department head until 1925.

Drawing of the Sword, a patriotic pageant written and produced by Stevens in 1917 at the Carnegie Institute, was later combined with a Red Cross pageant by Joseph Lindon Smith and toured the nation raising money for the Red Cross, raising over $1 million. The combined work was presented in Huntington, New York outside New York City on October 5, 1917, with an all-star cast including Ethel Barrymore, Alice Fischer, Blanche Yurka, Gladys Hanson, William Faversham, and many others. The pageant was repeated on October 25 and 26 at the Metropolitan Opera House. It was filmed as the National Red Cross Pageant, a now-lost silent film directed by Christy Cabanne.

In 1925 Stevens went back to Chicago to head a new theatre program and company at the Art Institute, the Goodman Memorial Theatre. He resigned in 1930 after pressure from the institute to produce more popular works.

Stevens later headed the Speech and Drama department at Stanford University and founded the Globe Players, a theatre group which performed Shakespeare plays at the Old Globe Theatre in San Diego. The group was based on theatre companies which Stevens had created and directed in abridged versions of Shakespeare to be presented during expositions in Chicago (The 1933 Century of Progress), San Diego (the 1935-6 California Pacific International Exposition, Dallas (the 1936 Texas Centennial Exposition), and Cleveland (the 1936-7 Great Lakes Exposition).

In July 1941 Stevens became the head of the dramatic arts department at the University of Arizona.

== Writings ==
Stevens was a prolific writer, publishing fifty-one books and eleven adaptions of Shakespeare, in addition to countless articles, lectures, and other short pieces.

Stevens' Lettering (1916) went through several editions and was widely used. His The Theatre From Athens to Broadway (1932) was based on his course lectures in theatre history at the Carnegie Institute.

Stevens was also a poet; his 1938 narrative poem Westward Under Vega attracted critical attention.

== Family ==
Stevens married etcher Helen F. Bradshaw (1878–1954) in 1904. They had a son, Alden Stevens, and a daughter, Phoebe.

== Legacy ==
Several of Stevens' etchings can be found at the Smithsonian Institution.

In addition to providing a model for drama departments nationwide, Stevens influenced many students who went on to careers in theatre and film. These included actor Carl Benton Reid, costumer and academic Lucy Barton, and actress Irene Tedrow.

A photo of Thomas Wood Stevens and his wife Helen by Elizabeth Buehrmann is in the collection of the New York Public Library.
