= William Main Doerflinger =

American writer (1910–2000)

William Main Doerflinger (July 30, 1910–December 23, 2000) was an American writer. He was also a folk song collector with a particular interest in sea shanties.

== Biography ==
Growing up, Doerflinger spent his school days on Staten Island and holidays on Long Island Sound where he acquired an interest in the sea. He studied languages at Princeton University and in his leisure time pursued the twin activities of stage magic and folk song collecting. After his third year at Princeton he visited Nova Scotia where he performed magic shows and collected over 60 songs that formed the basis of his 1931 Princeton thesis "Shantymen and Shantyboys", later the title of his major published folksong collection. After leaving Princeton he initially gained employment as a social worker, undertook graduate studies at Harvard University, contributed book reviews to the Saturday Review, and eventually found work in publishing, where he spent the remainder of his career, interrupted for a period during the Second World War when he worked in North Africa and Italy with the Office of War Information in the area of in psychological warfare. During his career as an editor for E. P. Dutton and Macmillan Inc. he assisted a wide range of authors including Edmund Hillary, Françoise Sagan, and Woody Guthrie whose autobiography Bound for Glory was edited/"organized" by Doerflinger's first wife, Joy Homer, and published in 1943. After his first wife's death in 1946, at age 31, he eventually remarried to her sister, the writer Anne Homer, the couple going on to have a further four children, among them the historian Thomas Main "Tom" Doerflinger (1952–2015), in addition to a daughter from his first marriage. Other than his collecting trips in Nova Scotia, New Brunswick and New England, he collected a number of his songs from residents at Sailors' Snug Harbor on Staten Island, New York, which was set up as a retirement home for destitute sailors.

Doerflinger on December 23, 2000, aged 90, in New Jersey. He is commemorated in The William Main Doerflinger Memorial Sea Shanty Sessions at the Noble Maritime Collection at Snug Harbor and a plaque at Staten Island commemorating his contribution to the canon of sea and lumber shanties.

== Published works and legacy ==
Doerflinger authored three books: The Middle Passage (1939, with Roland Barker), a historical novel about the Guinea Coast slave trade; Shantymen and Shantyboys (1951), republished with additions in 1972 as Songs of the Sailorman and Lumberman, documenting his major musical activity collecting songs from old sailors and lumberjacks between 1930 and 1950 (he recognised from early on that many of the men of coastal New England and Atlantic Canada spent only their summers at sea, and in the winter worked in the forest as lumberjacks, also known as shanty boys), and The Magic Catalogue: A Guide to the Wonderful World of Magic (1977).

Doerflinger published collection of over 150 maritime and lumberjack songs is acknowledged as a source for the seminal Shanties from the Seven Seas by Stan Hugill and includes the later well known song "The Leaving of Liverpool", which he collected twice from different singers in New York City, as well as others such as "(Bound for) South Australia" and "Poor Paddy Works on the Railway" which became popular in the folk revival of the 1950s-1960s. A subset of his field recordings from 1942, from a retired seaman "Captain" Patrick Tayluer in particular, were assisted by loan of equipment from the Library of Congress and are deposited there (for some additional information on these recordings see the Wikipedia Leaving of Liverpool page).
