= Sidney Homer =

American composer (1864–1950)

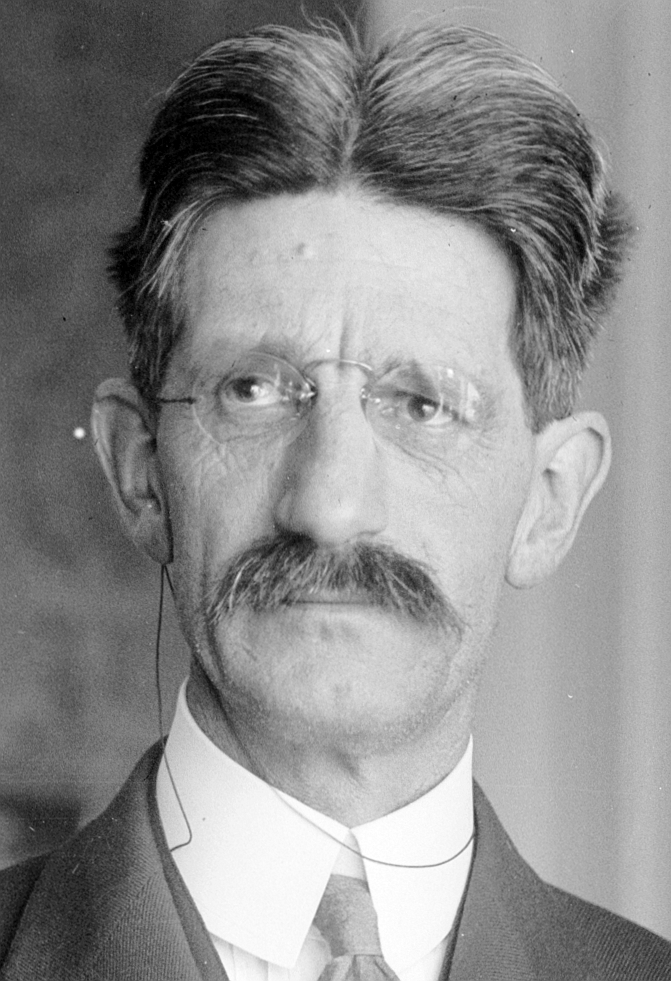
- Born: December 9, 1864; Boston, Massachusetts, US
- Died: July 10, 1953 (aged 88); Winter Park, Florida, US
- Education: Phillips Academy
- Spouse: Louise Dilworth Beatty (m. 1895; died 1947)
- Children: Anne Homer

Sidney Homer Sr. (December 9, 1864 – July 10, 1953) was a classical composer, primarily of songs.

== Biography ==
Homer was born on December 9, 1864 (some sources use 1865), in Boston. He attended the 1884 class of Phillips Academy in Andover, Massachusetts, but did not attend college, although he studied composition with George Whitefield Chadwick and with Josef Rheinberger in Munich. He married contralto Louise Dilworth Beatty in 1895.

Sidney and Louise had six children, including twin daughters Anne Homer and Kathryn Homer, son Sidney Homer, Jr. (economist and author), and daughter Louise Homer.

Homer died on July 10, 1953, aged 88, in Winter Park, Florida.

== Legacy ==
Homer's influence included his mentoring and supporting his nephew, the composer Samuel Barber. Scholarship on Homer was a particular focus of musicologist Harry Colin Thorpe.

Homer composed many of his songs with the voice of his famous wife in mind. Among his most famous songs are "A Banjo Song" (Weeden), "Requiem" (Stevenson), "Casey at the Bat" (Thayer), and "The House that Jack Built" ("Mother Goose").

Homer's memoir, My Wife and I, was published by Macmillan in 1939 and reprinted by Da Capo Press in 1978.
