= Daysville, Illinois =

Daysville
- Unincorporated community
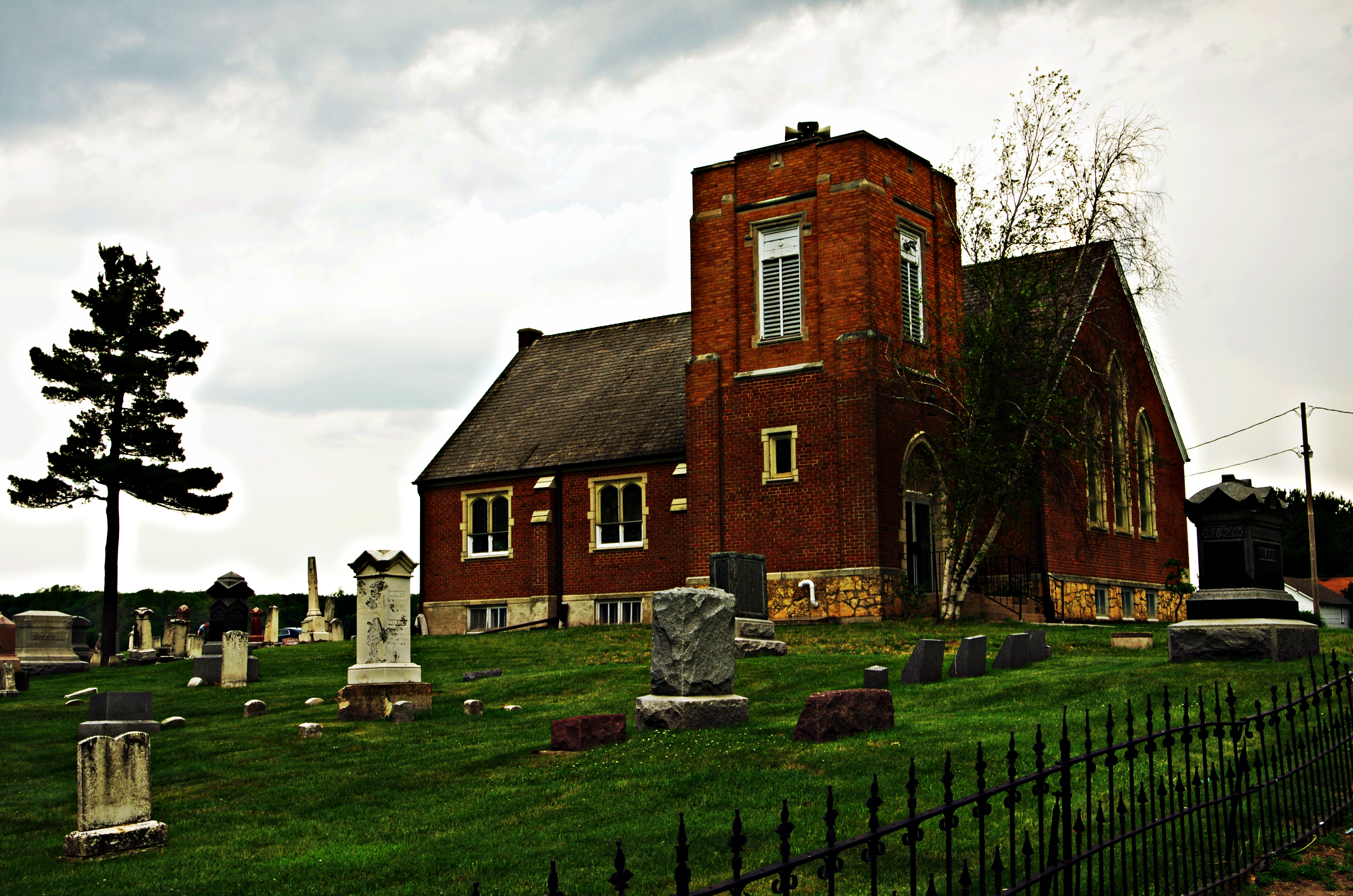
- Lighthouse United Methodist Church Cemetery

- Location within Ogle County Daysville (Illinois)
- Coordinates: 41°59′04″N 89°19′06″W
- Country: United States
- State: Illinois
- County: Ogle
- Township: Oregon-Nashua
- Elevation: 692 ft (211 m)
- Time zone: UTC-6 (CST)
  - Summer (DST): UTC-5 (CDT)
- ZIP code: 61061 (Oregon)
- Area code: 815
- GNIS feature ID: 407004

Daysville is an unincorporated community in Ogle County, Illinois, United States. It is located along the Rock River, southeast of Oregon.

== History ==
A post office was in operation at Daysville from 1839 to 1900. The community bears the name of Colonel Jehiel Day, a local pioneer.

Thomas Wood Stevens (1880-1942), American artist, playwright, and theatre academic, was born in Daysville.
