= Poor Paddy Works on the Railway =

Folk song

Song
- Published: 1864
- Genre: Folk

Audio sample
- file; help

"Poor Paddy Works on the Railway" is a popular Irish folk and American folk song (Roud 208). Historically, it was often sung as a sea shanty. The song portrays an Irish worker working on a railroad.

There are numerous titles for the song, including "Pat Works on the Railway" and "Paddy on the Railway" and "Fillimiooriay". "Paddy Works on the Erie" is another version of the song.

== History ==
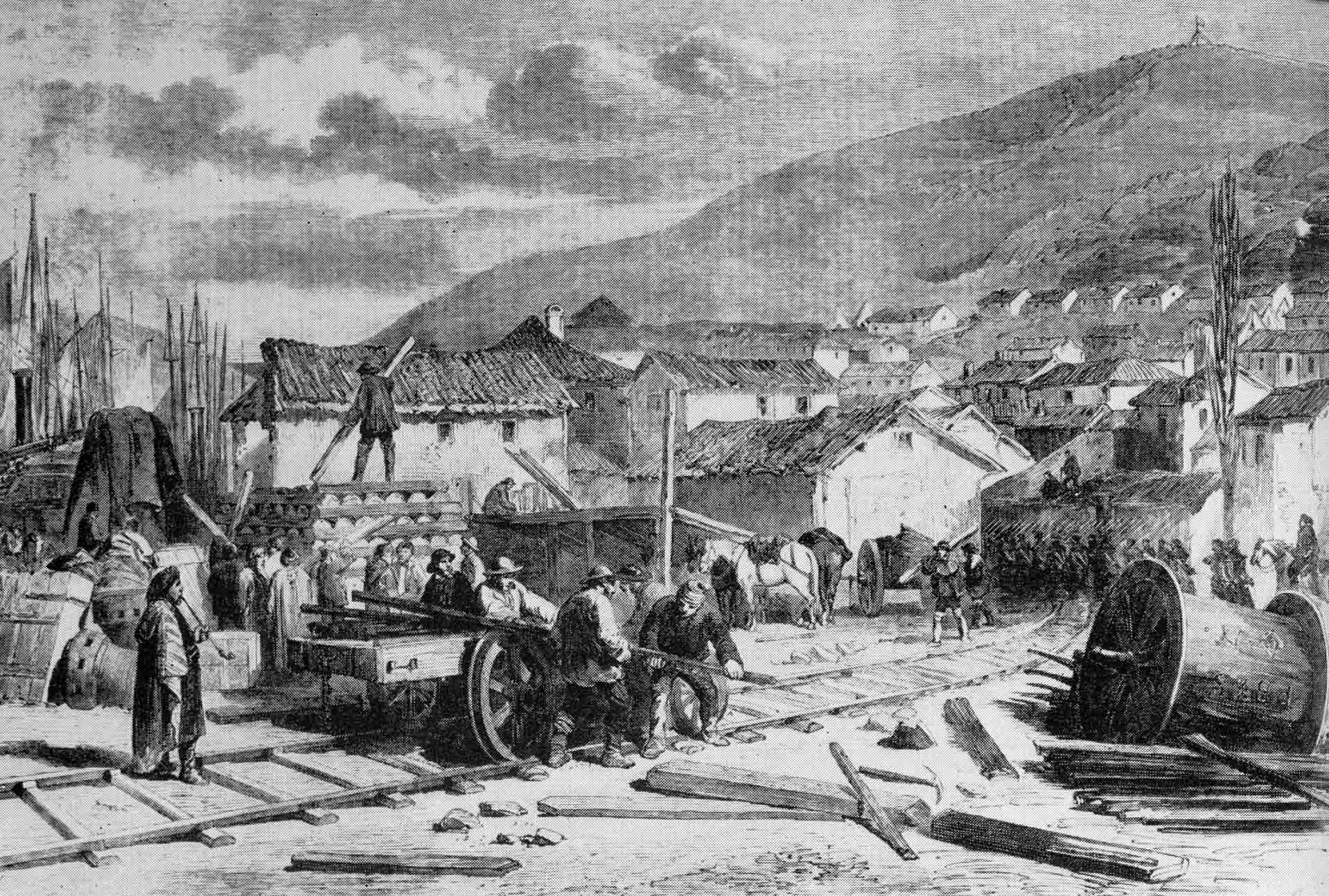
Navvies working on the railway in 1854

In The American Songbag, the writer Carl Sandburg claims that the song has been published in sheet music since the early 1850s. The earliest confirmed date of publication is from 1864 from a manuscript magazine. Ernest Bourne recorded the first version, released in 1941, by Alan Lomax for the Library of Congress in 1938 under the title "A-working on the Railway".

=== As a chanty ===
"Paddy on the Railway" is attested as a chanty in the earliest known published work to use the word chanty, G. E. Clark's Seven Years of a Sailor’s Life (1867). Clark recounted experiences fishing on the Grand Banks of Newfoundland, in a vessel out of Provincetown, Massachusetts, ca.1865–1866. At one point, the crew is getting up the anchor in a storm, by means of a pump-style windlass. One of the chanties the men sing while performing this task is mentioned by title, "Paddy on the Railway."

The song was next mentioned as a chanty in R. C. Adams' On Board the Rocket (1879), in which the sea captain tells of experiences in American vessels out of Boston in the 1860s. Adams includes an exposition on sailors' chanties, including their melodies and sample lyrics. In this discussion he quotes "Paddy, Come Work on the Railway":

In eighteen hundred and sixty-three,
I came across the stormy sea.
My dung'ree breeches I put on

Chorus: To work upon the railway, the railway,
To work up-on the railway.
Oh, poor Paddy come work on the railway.

Although these are among the earliest published references, there is other evidence to suggest that the chanty was sung as early as the 1850s. A reminiscence from the 1920s, for example, claims its use at the windlass of the following verse, aboard a packet ship out of Liverpool in 1857:

In 1847 Paddy Murphy went to Heaven
To work on the railway, the railway, the railway,
Oh, poor Paddy works upon the railway.

Several versions of this chanty were audio-recorded from the singing of veteran sailors in the 1920s–40s by folklorists like R. W. Gordon, J. M. Carpenter, and William Main Doerflinger. Captain Mark Page, whose sea experience spanned 1849–1879, sang it for Carpenter in the late 1920s.

== Background ==
During the mid-19th century, Irish immigrants worked to build railways in the United Kingdom and the United States. The song reflects the work that thousands of Irish section crews did as track layers, gaugers, spikers, and bolters. The song begins in 1841, during the time of the Irish diaspora.

== Melody ==
For a number of versions, the melody of the first lines of each stanza resembles the song "Johnny I Hardly Knew Ye" and "When Johnny Comes Marching Home". Oftentimes, the song becomes faster progressively.

== Appearances ==
This song has been performed by numerous musicians and singers, including Ewan MacColl, The Weavers, Luke Kelly with The Dubliners, The Wolfe Tones, The Tossers, The Kelly Family, Shane MacGowan with The Pogues and Ferocious Dog, and The Cottars.

In the Shining Time Station episode "Impractical Jokes," two versions of this song were sung. One was sung by Tom Callinan, Matt, and Tanya, and the other was sung by Tex and Rex.

== See also ==
- List of train songs
- Folk music of Ireland
- VLTJ in Popular culture
