= The Pageant and Masque of Saint Louis =

1914 historical pageant in St. Louis, Missouri, USA

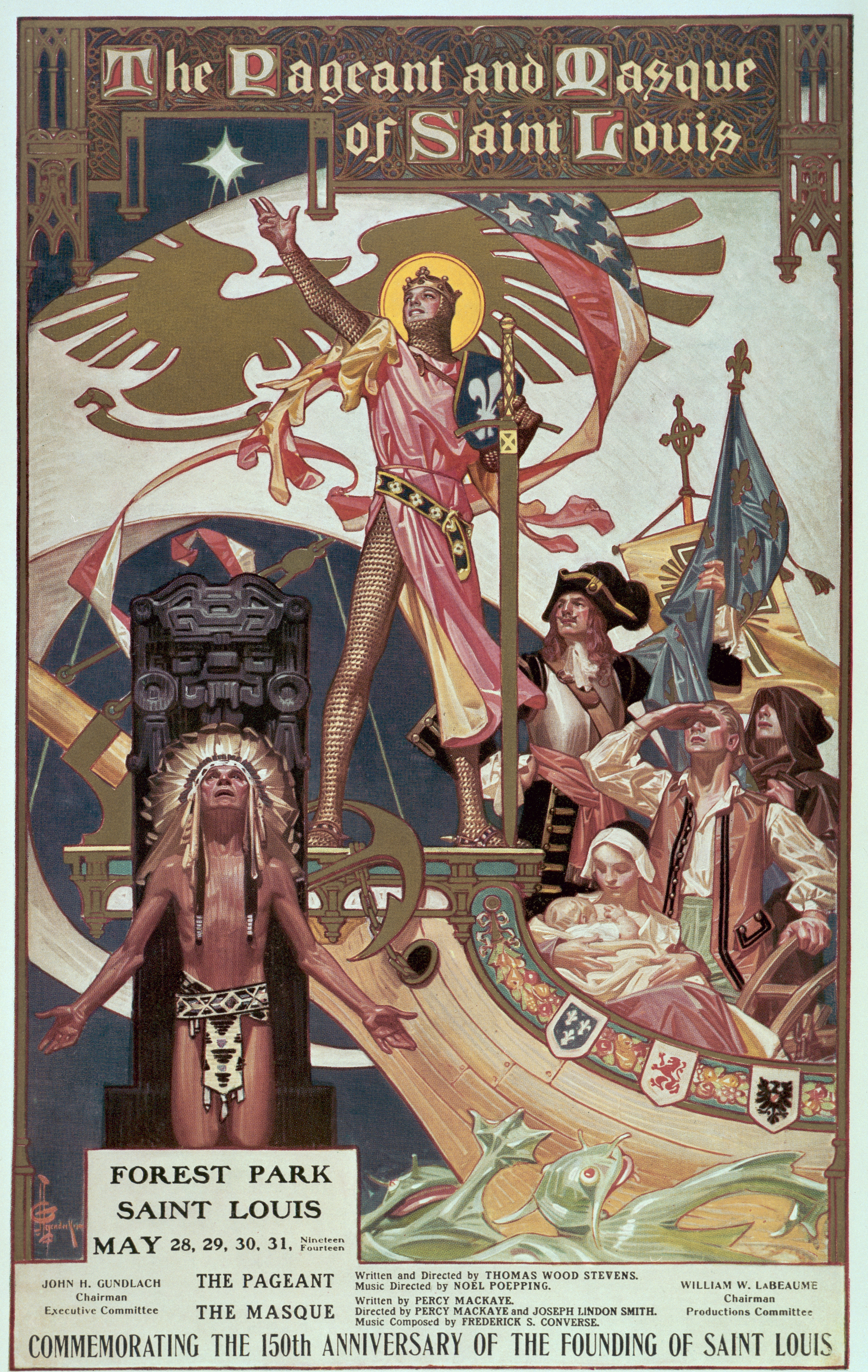
Poster by artist Joseph C. Leyendecker. The original painting is on display in the Rare Books & Manuscripts Room at St. Louis Public Library's Central Library.

The Pageant and Masque of Saint Louis was a historical pageant presented May 28 – June 1, 1914, in Forest Park, St. Louis, Missouri. Commemorating the 150th anniversary of the founding of the city, it was one of the largest theatrical events ever presented. Five hours in length, the city-wide event included a pageant surveying 300 years of local history, from the Mound Builders through the Civil War. An allegorical civic masque by playwright Percy MacKaye followed.

== Production ==
In the spring of 1914, the city of St. Louis celebrated its 150th anniversary by staging The Pageant and Masque of St. Louis. With a cast of 7,500 local volunteers and an audience of 75,000 on opening night, it was one of the largest theatrical events ever presented. From May 28 to June 1 (plus one rain-out), the two-part spectacle was performed on the slope of Art Hill in Forest Park. City leaders and Progressive era civic boosters planned the event with the purpose of uniting citizens towards a prosperous future by sharing its rich history. Following the success of The Pageant and Masque of Saint Louis, the Municipal Opera was established nearby, five years later.

Charlotte Rumbold, the secretary of the Public Recreation Commission of the St. Louis Park Dept., first suggested a city-wide event to coincide with the 150th anniversary of the founding of the city. She was among the many civic leaders who felt St. Louis was in decline because of poor political, social, and economic conditions. It was the era of political machines, monopolistic corporations, and a flood of unskilled European immigrants. Local businessmen John H. Gunlach, Luther Ely Smith, William W. La Beaume, and Charles A. Stix played major roles as Pageant Committee members.

An enormous semicircular stage was constructed for the show. Built on pilings in the Grand Basin, the stage was over 500 ft. wide and 200 ft. deep. A 40-foot-high wall at the rear of the stage served as a sounding board. A pit large enough to accommodate the 100-piece orchestra and 1000-voice chorus was built at the center-rear of the stage against the backdrop.

The Pageant, performed at 5:30 pm, surveyed three centuries of local history, from the Mound Builders through the Civil War. The Masque, an allegorical tale, began at 8:30 pm. Together, the two productions lasted approximately five hours.

Thomas Wood Stevens, a nationally recognized master of modern American pageantry, wrote and directed the Pageant portion of the event. Beginning in 1909 Stevens wrote and/or directed over 50 pageants and masques in 20 states and in Europe.

Artist/director Joseph Lindon Smith and Percy MacKaye, a playwright and poet, collaborated on the "masque" segment of the program, fashioning a symbolic sweep through St. Louis history told in pantomime and dance. Some of Smith's vivid sketches for costumes survive. He designed scenery as well, including a temple based on architecture he had seen and painted at Chichen Itza. Smith was best known for his paintings of Egyptian antiquities. Frederick M. Converse composed the music for Saint Louis: A Civic Masque.
