= Riccardo Martin =

American opera singer

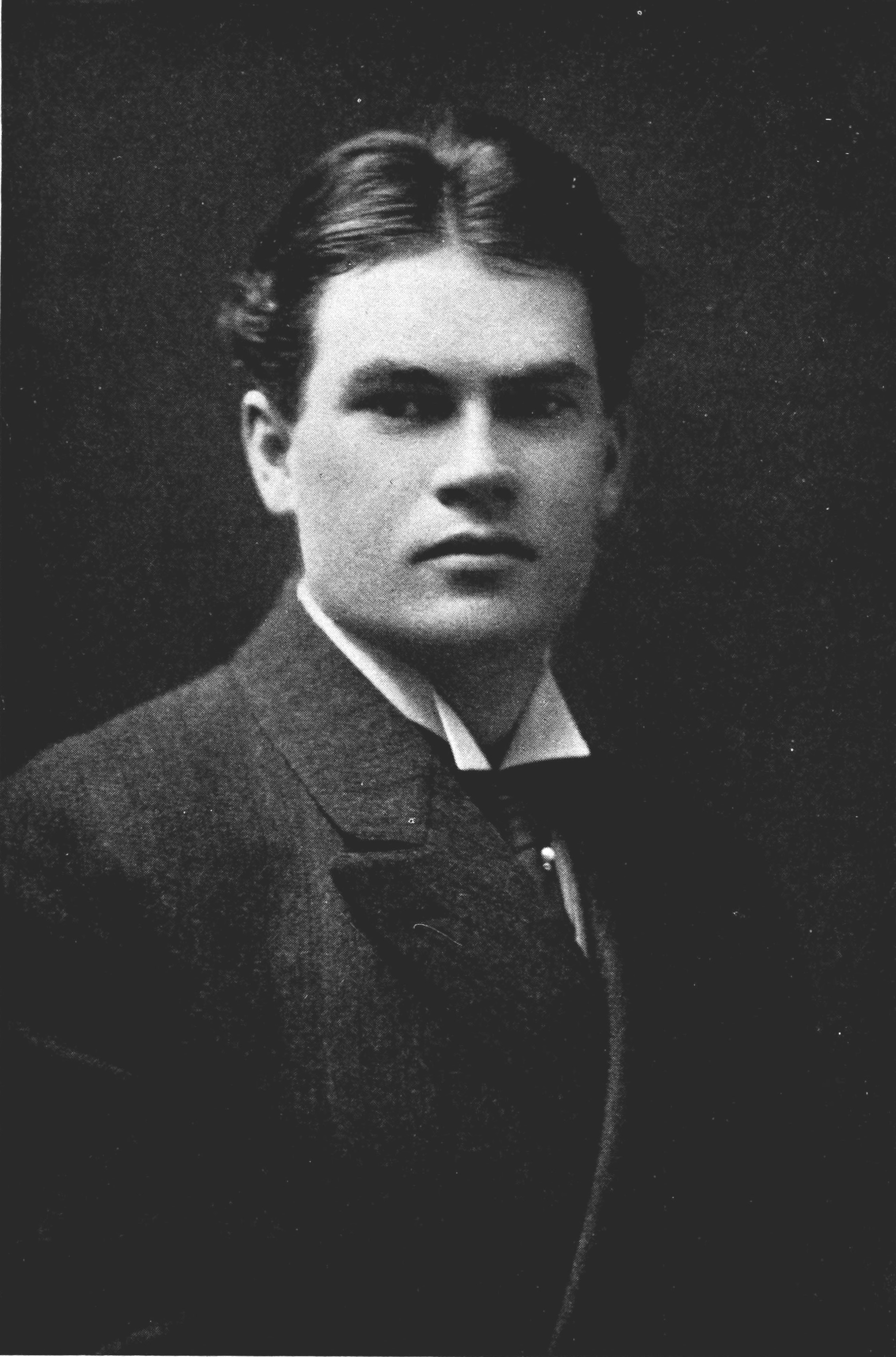
Riccardo Martin

Riccardo Martin (November 18, 1874 – August 11, 1952) was an American tenor.

Born Hugh Whitfield Martin in Hopkinsville, Kentucky, Martin began his career at Columbia University studying music composition under Edward MacDowell. It was while studying at Columbia that Martin's vocal talents were discovered. In 1901 he was granted an endowment by industrialist Henry Flagler to study to further his vocal studies in Paris with Giovanni Sbriglia, Jean de Reszke and Léon Escalaïs. Martin later completed his studies with Vincenzo Lombardi in Florence and Beniamino Carelli in Naples. He debuted as Faust in Nantes in 1904. Two years later he made his American debut in New Orleans, singing with the visiting San Carlo Opera. Martin bowed at the Metropolitan Opera on November 20, 1907, in Mefistofele; the performance also marked the American debut of Fyodor Chaliapin.

Martin remained with the Metropolitan through the 1914–15 season, appearing in numerous leading tenor roles; he was among the first American-born leading men the company employed. He returned for the 1917–18 season. During his tenure at the Met, he created the lead tenor roles in three American operas: Walter Damrosch's Cyrano, Horatio Parker's Mona, and Frederick Shepherd Converse's The Pipe of Desire. After leaving the company he appeared with numerous companies throughout America and Europe, and spent three seasons with the Chicago Civic Opera. Martin died in New York City in 1952.

Martin is known to have married at least three times according to newspaper accounts and vital records. He first married in 1899, to Elfrida Hildegarde Klamroth, a fellow opera singer more widely known by the stage name Ruano Bogislav. They had one child, Beth Martin, commonly and professionally known as Bijie Martin. The couple divorced before 1920, largely due to career differences. Martin's 1923 marriage to aspiring actress Jane Grey also ended in divorce. His last known marriage was in 1932, to Allis Beaumont, who has recently become famous as Allis Beaumont Reid in the documentary "Must Read After My Death" (2007).
