= Charles F. G. Kuyk =

United States Air Force officer (1926–2025)

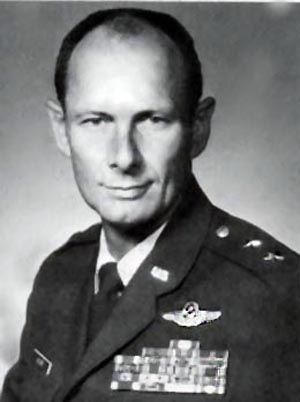
- Born: July 28, 1926; New York City, U.S.
- Died: December 20, 2025 (aged 99); Gig Harbor, Washington, U.S.
- Military career
- Allegiance: United States
- Branch: United States Air Force
- Service years: 1951–1980
- Rank: Major General
- Commands: Twenty-Second Air Force

Charles Frederick Goodwyn Kuyk Jr. (July 28, 1926 – December 20, 2025) was a major-general of the United States Air Force. He was also the named party in the Supreme Court Case Poe v. Kuyk.

== Education ==
Kuyk attended the U.S. Military Academy at West Point, New York, graduating with a commission of second lieutenant and a bachelor of science degree in military science. Kuyk attained his post-graduate degree from The George Washington University, Washington, D.C., with a master's in international relations. He was also a graduate of the Command and Staff School of the Naval War College and the Air War College.

== Military career ==
Kuyk enlisted in the U.S. Marine Corps in July 1944 prior to attending West Point. He received his pilot wings in 1951 and was assigned to the 19th Bombardment Group on Okinawa during the Korean War in which he flew 32 combat missions.

Beginning in 1952, Kuyk served with the Strategic Air Command's 93rd Bombardment Wing. In 1954 he was assigned to the 310th Bombardment Wing, where he served as aircraft commander, instructor pilot and assistant operations officer. In 1958 General Kuyk entered the U.S. Air Force Test Pilot School and Kuyk served as an experimental test pilot from 1959 to 1963. From October 1967 to November 1968 he flew 168 combat missions with the 42nd Tactical Electronic Warfare Squadron at Takhli, Thailand. From 1968 to 1971, General Kuyk served on the Air Staff in the Office of the Deputy Chief of Staff, Research and Development. In June 1973 he took command of the 436th Military Airlift Wing.

In 1975 he was appointed deputy director for strategic forces and in 1977 director of Operational Requirements, Office of the Deputy Chief of Staff, Research and Development, Headquarters U.S. Air Force. Kuyk took command of the Twenty-Second Air Force in July 1979.

Kuyk was promoted to major general in 1977 and retired from the Air Force in 1980.

== Poe v. Kuyk ==
Lewis W. Poe, Petitioner, v. Charles F. G. Kuyk, Jr., et al.

The focus of the case is on whether an unhappy plaintiff from one court may attempt to proceed with his/her case using a different theory in a second court. The argument is if the prior determination of one district court regarding the 'availability of nationwide service of process' as directed by 28 U.S.C. § 1391(e) is binding upon another court when the defendants are the same but the capacity in which they are sued differs.

== Personal life and death ==
Charles F. G. Kuyk was the son of Charles Frederick Goodwyn Kuyk and Vivian Mae Derrick. He was, through his father, a descendant of Peterson Goodwyn, William Thornton (Virginia burgess) and William Thornton (immigrant).

Kuyk died in Gig Harbor, Washington, on December 20, 2025, at the age of 99.

== Decorations and awards ==
- Distinguished Service Medal with oak leaf cluster
- Legion of Merit with oak leaf cluster
- Distinguished Flying Cross
- Bronze Star Medal
- Meritorious Service Medal
- Air Medal with 10 oak leaf clusters
- Air Force Commendation Medal with two oak leaf clusters
- Air Force Outstanding Unit Award ribbon with two oak leaf clusters and "V" device.
