= William Thornton (Virginia burgess) =

American planter and politician (1717–1790)

- Born: December 20, 1717; Gloucester County, Colony of Virginia, British America
- Died: 1790 (aged 72–73); Brunswick County, Virginia, United States
- Occupations: Planter, Politician

William Thornton (December 20, 1717 – 1790) was a British American planter and public official in Colonial Virginia. Thornton served as member of the House of Burgesses for Brunswick County from 1756 to 1768 and as justice of the county and of the quorum as early as 1760 and as late as 1774/5. Thornton was the great-grandson of William Thornton who arrived in Virginia from England as late as 1646 settling in Gloucester County, Virginia. He was through his paternal line a cousin of fellow burgesses, Francis Thornton of Spotsylvania, Presley Thornton of Northumberland, George Thornton of Spotsylvania, William Thornton of King George and William Thornton of Richmond County, Virginia.

== Early life and education ==
William Thornton was born in Gloucester County, Virginia, to Francis Thornton (1692–1737). His father was a wealthy planter of Petsworth Parish, where the Thornton family had been established since the 1640s. Thornton's father would go on to inherit the lands of his grandfather and would serve as a vestryman of Petsworth Parish. As part of the planting elite he was afforded an education far above that of most colonial Americans. Though it is not precisely known where he received his education it is likely he attended the College of William & Mary, as currently no records indicate he was sent to England as a number of sons of Virginia planters were. He married his first cousin Jane Clack on June 25, 1736, at Ware Parish. The church had been built by her paternal grandfather, an Oxford educated Anglican minister during his tenure.

== Career ==
In 1752, William Thornton removed to Brunswick County, Virginia. At the time the country was in the frontier reaches of the Colony. Thornton quickly rose to be one of the foremost citizens of his county through his large land grant and familial connection. His prominence gained him political prowess ultimately leading to his election to the House of Burgesses in 1756. By 1760 he was able to expand his power in Brunswick County by attaining the position of Justice. Thornton appears to have over-reached in the powers of his office, in 1764, the citizens of Brunswick County sent a petition to the Acting Colonial Governor, Francis Fauquier complaining of the conduct and character of the justices of the county court. The petition specifically alleges that Thornton and his brother-in-law John Clack appeared on the bench in cases they had a personal interest in and refused to hear evidence in cases which resulted in innocent people having to pay costs. If the petition had any effect it appears not to have taken so until 1768, when Thornton finally left the office of Burgess. Little is known of his later years, he appears to have focused on planting and retired from the political realm of Williamsburg before the Revolution.

== Family ==
William Thornton and Jane Clack were the parents of thirteen children. Four of his sons, Francis, William, Sterling and Reuben are known to have served during the American Revolution receiving the ranks of officers. Many of his descends held vast tracts of land and prominent social and political positions in the Southside of Virginia.

Children of William Thornton and Jane Clack are:

- Francis Thornton, (born June 25, 1738, in Gloucester County, Virginia; died 1745 in Gloucester County, Virginia).
- James Thornton, (born July 11, 1743, in Gloucester County). He married Elizabeth Jones March 2, 1762, in Granville County, North Carolina.
- John Thornton, (born September 13, 1744, in Gloucester County, Virginia; died 1822).
- Elizabeth Thornton, (born March 23, 1744/45, in Gloucester County, Virginia; died September 27, 1746, in Gloucester County, Virginia).
- Francis Thornton, (born October 22, 1747, in Gloucester County, Virginia; died November 18, 1808, in Charlotte County, Virginia). He married (1) a purported Miss Wyatt 1768. He married (2) Anne Pettus, October 15, 1801, in Charlotte County, Virginia. Through his daughter Susan Lacy Thornton (wife of John Tuggle) he is the great-great grandfather of tenor Riccardo Martin 3rd great grandfather of Bijie Martin and the 4th great grandfather of Charles F. G. Kuyk. Through his daughter Mary Nunnally he is the great grandfather of J. Waddy Tate
- William Thornton, (born April 14, 1751, in Gloucester County, Virginia; died July 7, 1815). He married Sarah Goodrich February 16, 1774, in Brunswick County, Virginia.
- Sterling Clack Thornton, (born August 12, 1753, in Gloucester County, Virginia; died August 2, 1831, in Lynchburg, Virginia). He married (1) Sallie Moseley. He married (2) Mary Jones March 17, 1777, in Petersburg, Virginia; born 1750 in Amelia County, Virginia; died 1815 in Lynchburg, Virginia (prominent racehorse owner). His grandson was U. S. diplomat John A. Bridgland.
- Reuben Thornton, (born March 28, 1756, in Brunswick County, Virginia). He married Prudence Jones.(drowned in the Staunton River)
- Ann Sterling Thornton, (born March 27, 1758, in Brunswick County, Virginia). She married ? Osborne, November 26, 1792.
- Mary Thornton, (born July 21, 1760, in Brunswick County, Virginia). She married Thomas Faircloth, November 28, 1792.
- Jane Thornton, (born January 9, 1763, in Brunswick County, Virginia). She married Richard Clough, February 10, 1790.
- Peter Presley Thornton, (born November 12, 1765, in Brunswick County, Virginia; died August 6, 1856, in Amherst County, Virginia). He married Mary McCulloch, March 9, 1792, in Amherst County, Virginia; (born February 25, 1771, in Amherst County, Virginia; died September 19, 1851, in Amherst County, Virginia).
