= Mona (opera) =

1912 opera by Horatio Parker and Brian Hooker

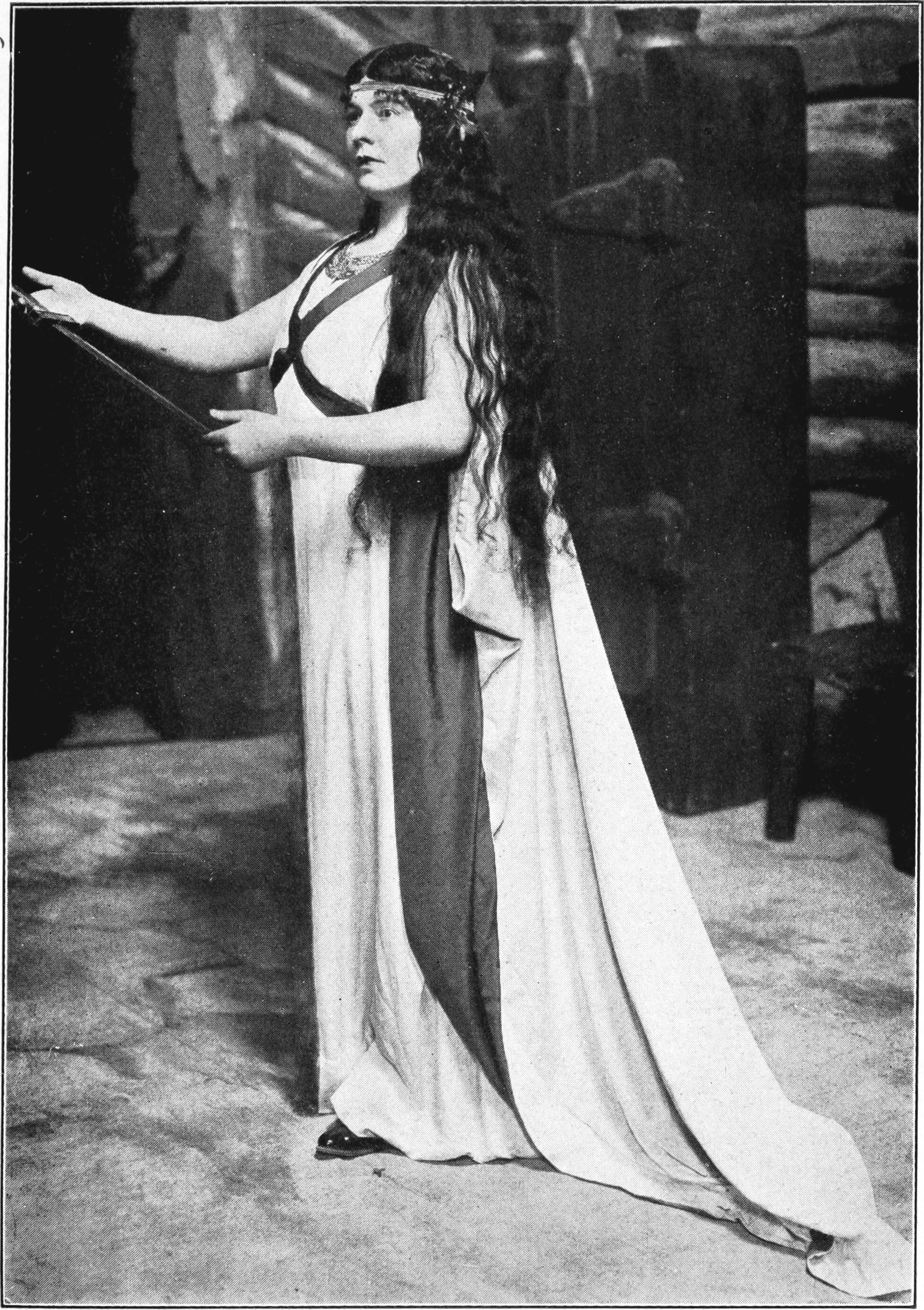
Louise Homer in Mona

Mona is an opera in three acts by composer Horatio Parker with an English libretto by Brian Hooker. The opera premiered at the Metropolitan Opera on 14 March 1912 after the work won the Met's composition competition in 1911.

== Roles ==
Role	Voice type	Premiere Cast, 14 March 1912 (Conductor: Alfred Hertz)
Mona	contralto	Louise Homer
Quintus	tenor	Riccardo Martin
Enya	mezzo-soprano	Rita Fornia
Arth	bass	Herbert Witherspoon
Gloom	baritone	William Hinshaw
Nial	tenor	Albert Reiss
Caradoc	tenor	Lambert Murphy
Governor	bass	Putnam Griswold
Old Man	bass	Basil Ruysdael

== Sources ==
- usopera.com
