= Bijie Martin =

American fashion director, writer and actress

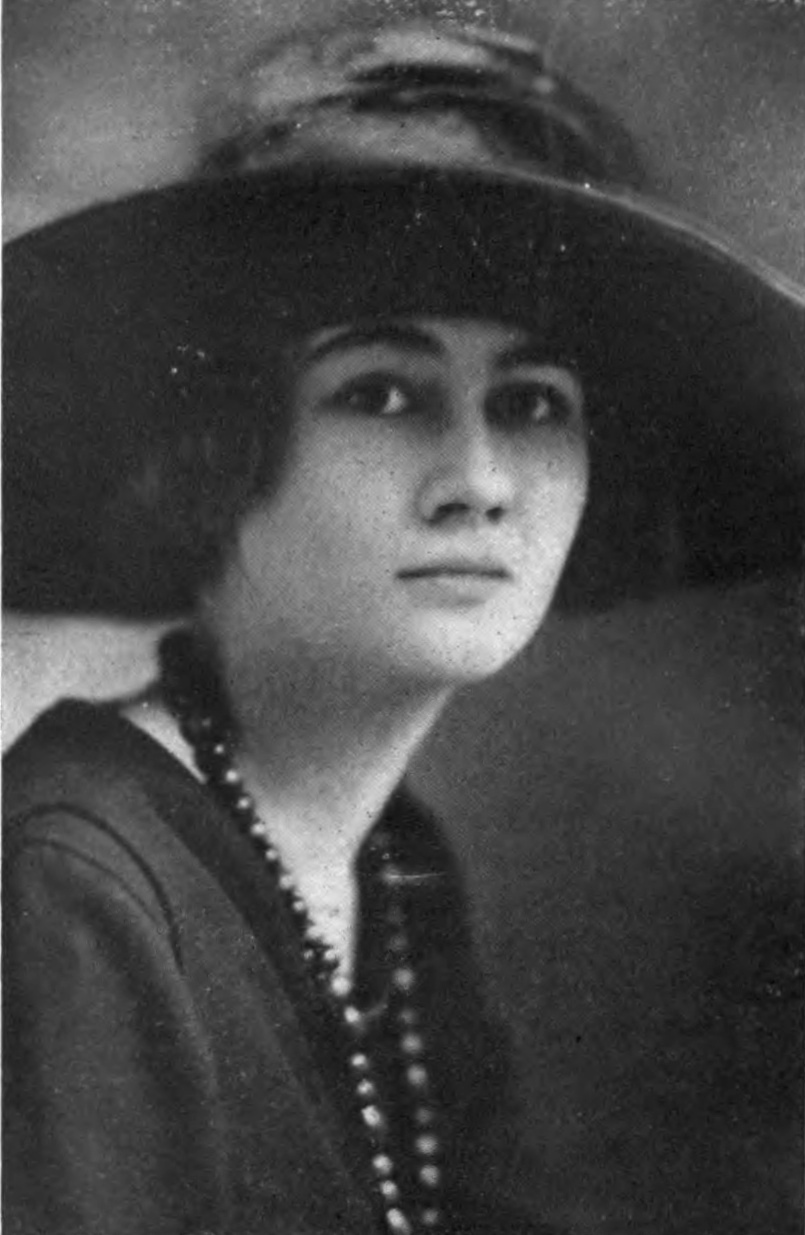
Bijie Martin, 1918

Beth "Bijie" Martin (October 13, 1900 – January 30, 1968) was an American fashion director, writer and actress.

Born in New York City, she was the daughter of American Opera singers Riccardo Martin and Ruano Bogislav. From the time Martin was a small child she was dubbed 'Bijie' by her theatrical parents who moved between homes in New York, Paris and Italy. She early on developed an interest in theatre, but unlike her vocally talented parents opted to find a path on dramatic stage. Her brief though critically praised theatrical career in the early 1920s led to a close friendship with actress Tallulah Bankhead whom she met in London. Both woman shared an affinity for fashion and bohemian living with a devotion and flare for their Southern backgrounds (Martin's father a Kentuckian born to a prominent Virginia family whom descended from William Thornton, William Thornton, and Christopher Branch. Martin's theatre opportunities began to wane by 1928 and she opted to leave the stage to reside in Paris with her mother.

In 1928, Martin married Rudolph de Wardener. De Wardener was the American born son of Austro-Hungarian aristocrat Baron Rudolph de Wardener, who had arrived in the United States to fight for the Union Army during the Civil War. Wardener was a broker living in Paris at the time of the marriage and Martin remained in Paris until the outbreak of the Second World War. The marriage eventually fell apart and the two divorced though Martin retained her husband's name for the rest of her life. Early on Martin developed a fashion career and while in Paris found a position in the fashion house of couturier Main Rousseau Bocher better known as Mainbocher. Martin remained as "Directrice" of the company for nearly thirty years overseeing the development of fashion lines and maintaining strong connections with high-profile customers including the Duchess of Windsor. Martin followed the company to New York where she remained until her retirement. During her New York period she regularly contributed to fashion magazines and other periodicals on fashion theory and developing women's fashion trends. She died at the age of 68 at Norwalk, Connecticut.
