= Harry Hays Morgan Jr. =

American actor and Diplomat

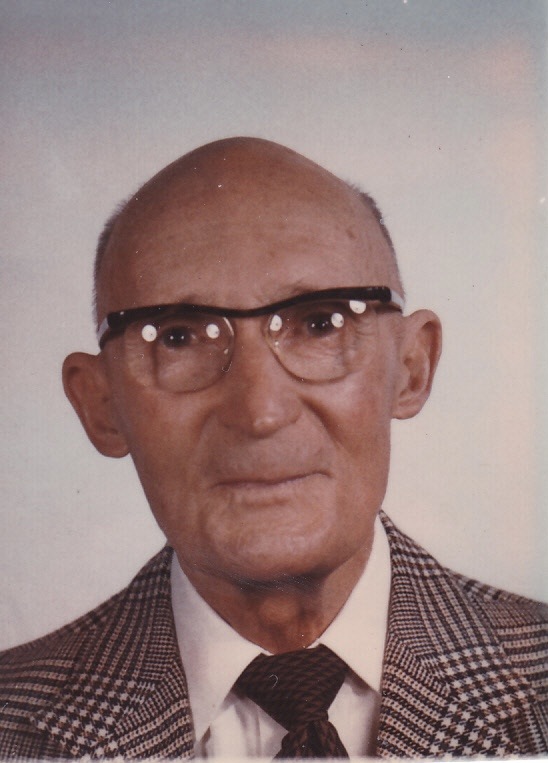
- Born: April 25, 1898; Horgen, Switzerland
- Died: July 8, 1983 (aged 85); Barcelona, Spain
- Occupations: Diplomat, actor, society figure
- Spouse(s): Ivor Elizabeth O'Connor (m. 1923–1927; divorced); Edith Churchill Gordon (m. 1932–1948; her death); Sybil Robertina (Robin) Willys Boyce, married May 14, 1954
- Children: 1
- Relatives: Thelma Furness, Viscountess Furness (sister); Gloria Morgan Vanderbilt (sister); Hugh Judson Kilpatrick (maternal grandfather)

Harry Hays Morgan Jr. (April 25, 1898 – July 8, 1983) was an American diplomat, society figure and actor. He is most notable as the brother of Gloria Morgan Vanderbilt and uncle of Gloria Vanderbilt.

== Early life ==
Morgan was born April 25, 1898, in Horgen, Switzerland, to Henry Hays Morgan Sr., an American diplomat who served as U.S. consul general at Buenos Aires, Argentina; Berlin, Germany; Amsterdam, Netherlands; Havana, Cuba; and Brussels, Belgium, and his Peruvian-born wife, Laura Delphine Kilpatrick. Morgan's father was the son of Louisiana planters, his mother was the daughter of U.S. Civil War General and diplomat Hugh Judson Kilpatrick. Morgan was raised primarily in Europe, one of four children including sisters Consuelo Morgan Thaw, Gloria Morgan Vanderbilt and Thelma Furness, Viscountess Furness and two half-sisters from his father's first marriage who remained in the United States. He graduated from Columbia University in 1919. Educated in Europe, at age 19 he enlisted as a private in Squadron A of the New York National Guard on July 2, 1917. After this unit was federalized in connection with World War I, he was transferred to the United States Army, where he served as private, and later Sergeant of the Headquarters Detachment G-2 Office, of the 79th Division of the United States. Morgan and his wife, Edith Churchill Gordon and daughter, departed Europe via Lisbon on January 31, 1941, arriving in New York February 10, 1941, shortly after the family resided in Beverly Hills, California. He served overseas July 8, 1918 until May 17, 1919, where he was discharged and resumed his diplomatic duties.

Morgan was President of the St. Moritz Tobogganing Club (known as the "Cresta Run" from 1933 to 1939. On February 7, 1938, Morgan cemented his status in tobogganing history by breaking the Cresta Run record while also winning the Morgan Cup. Two days later, he secured victory in the Cresta Run Grand National. The Morgan Cup: Named in his honor, the Morgan Cup is one of the premier classic races held during the high season. True to tradition, the trophy holds 29-1/2 bottles of Champagne, which the winner is expected to fill Harry Hays Morgan, Jr. married Sybil Robertina Boyce-Willis in Montana (Valais), Switzerland, May 14, 1954.

== Military service ==
Enlisted 2 Jul 1917 New York City. Mustered in 22 Jul 1917 as a captain, Troop D, __ Regt. Served overseas, Jul 1918-Jul 1919. Discharged 17 May 1919 as a private, "on demobilization."

== Diplomatic career ==
He followed in his father's footsteps entering the diplomatic corps as U.S. Vice Consul at Glasgow, Scotland and later Brussels, Belgium and Vienna, Austria.

== Film career ==
Morgan began a foray into acting in 1943, first appearing in an uncredited role in Let's Face It. Morgan would go on to appear in 27 films between 1943 and 1948 including Ivy, The Snake Pit and Uncertain Glory. His family then resided in Beverly Hills, California, where Morgan (not to be confused by the more famous actor, Harry Morgan) appeared in numerous films.

== Personal life ==
Morgan was married three times.

First: In 1923 in New York to Ivor Elizabeth O'Connor, the Parisian-born daughter of Dallas Banking magnate James C. O'Connor and Ivor Branch Tate, a sister of former Dallas mayor J. Waddy Tate and descendants of William Thornton. O'Connor was formerly married to Rembert D. Trezevant. O'Connor and Morgan divorced at Paris in 1927. Despite having divorced Morgan in 1927, she testified in 1936 on behalf of her former sister-in-law, Gloria Morgan Vanderbilt during the custody trial of Gloria Vanderbilt. O'Connor died in Antibes, France, in 1937 at age 36. O'Connor left a large estate which included stock, cash and real estate primarily in Dallas, where her land holdings included the property which eventually became Neiman Marcus and an interest in The First National Bank of Dallas. Much of her property was divested into 'Ivor O'Connor Morgan Trust' which provides benefit to children medicine at Dallas area hospitals and for the care of dogs.

Second: In 1932 in Baltimore to Edith Churchill Gordon, the Philadelphia-born daughter of James Lindsay Gordon, a Virginia-born prominent New York attorney and Emily Adele Schlichter. He and his wife, Edith Churchill Gordon and daughter, departed Europe via Lisbon on January 31, 1941, arriving in New York February 10, 1941, shortly after the family resided in Beverly Hills, California. Gordon's maternal grandfather was Isaac Schlichter, president of Schlichter Jute Cordage Company and Frankford Hospital; her paternal great-grandfather was William F. Gordon a prominent nineteenth century Virginian politician. Gordon was previously married to Paul Mitchell Arnold. Gordon and Morgan had one child together, Thelma Gloria Consuelo Morgan (born December 17, 1933, in Paris, France). She died at age 48 in 1948 in Los Angeles after a two-year illness. Thelma Gloria Consuelo Morgan married Ian McKenzie Pringle on May 14, 1953 and had two children, a son, Charles McKenzie Pringle and a daughter, Susan McKenzie Pringle Eckel. Consuelo Pringle (née Thelma Gloria Consuelo Morgan) divorced Ian Pringle in 1962; Ian McKenzie Pringle later died at the age of 54, murdered at his home in Ocho Rios, Jamaica, West Indies on February 7, 1987. Consuelo Morgan later married Jackson (Jack) W. Moore in New York City, NY on June 11, 1965. Consuelo Moore and Jack Moore had one son, Jackson Wyatt Moore, Jr. Jack W. Moore (1915–1984) died at the age of 69 in 1984; his wife Consuelo Morgan Moore (1933–2014) died at the age of 80 in 2014; both are interred in Court 1, Section BB, Column 37, Niche 1, at the Columbarium at Arlington National Cemetery.

Third: Harry Hays Morgan, Jr. married Sybil Robertina (Robin) Boyce-Willis in Montana (Valais), Switzerland, May 14, 1954.Sybil Robertina (Robin) Willys Boyce (October 11, 1906 in London, England - October 13, 1994 in Miami-Dade County, Florida). Morgan and Boyce remained married to Morgan's death.

Morgan first retired to Majorca, Spain, and later Barcelona, Spain, where he died on July 8, 1983 in Barcelona, Catalonia, Spain.

== Filmography ==
Year	Title	Role	Notes
1943	Let's Face It	Waiter / Nazi Officer	Uncredited
1944	Standing Room Only	Guest at Ritchie Home	Uncredited
1944	Uncertain Glory	German Officer with Major	Uncredited
1944	Address Unknown	Waiter	Uncredited
1944	The Hitler Gang	Gen. Von Schleicher	Uncredited
1945	Bring On the Girls	Waiter	Uncredited
1945	The Horn Blows at Midnight	Headwaiter	Uncredited
1945	Paris Underground	Gestapo Officer	Uncredited
1945	Hold That Blonde	Dinner Guest	Uncredited
1945	My Name Is Julia Ross	Robinson	Uncredited
1945	The Stork Club	Diner at Stork Club	Uncredited
1946	Do You Love Me	Prof. Allen	Uncredited
1946	Avalanche	Duncan	
1946	Never Say Goodbye	Headwaiter	Uncredited
1946	Abie's Irish Rose	Hotel Clerk	
1947	Ivy	Lord Ventner	Uncredited
1947	Nightmare Alley	Headwaiter	Uncredited
1947	Forever Amber	Courtier	Uncredited
1947	It Had to Be You	Benson	Uncredited
1947	A Double Life	Guest	Uncredited
1948	Women in the Night	Gen. Hundman	
1948	Silver River	McComb's Tailor	Uncredited
1948	Lulu Belle	Maitre d'	Uncredited
1948	The Gallant Blade	Chamberlain	Uncredited
1948	The Snake Pit	Doctor	Uncredited
1948	Joan of Arc	Guard	Uncredited
1948	Adventures of Don Juan	Head Usher	Uncredited, (final film role)
