= Frederick Converse =

American composer

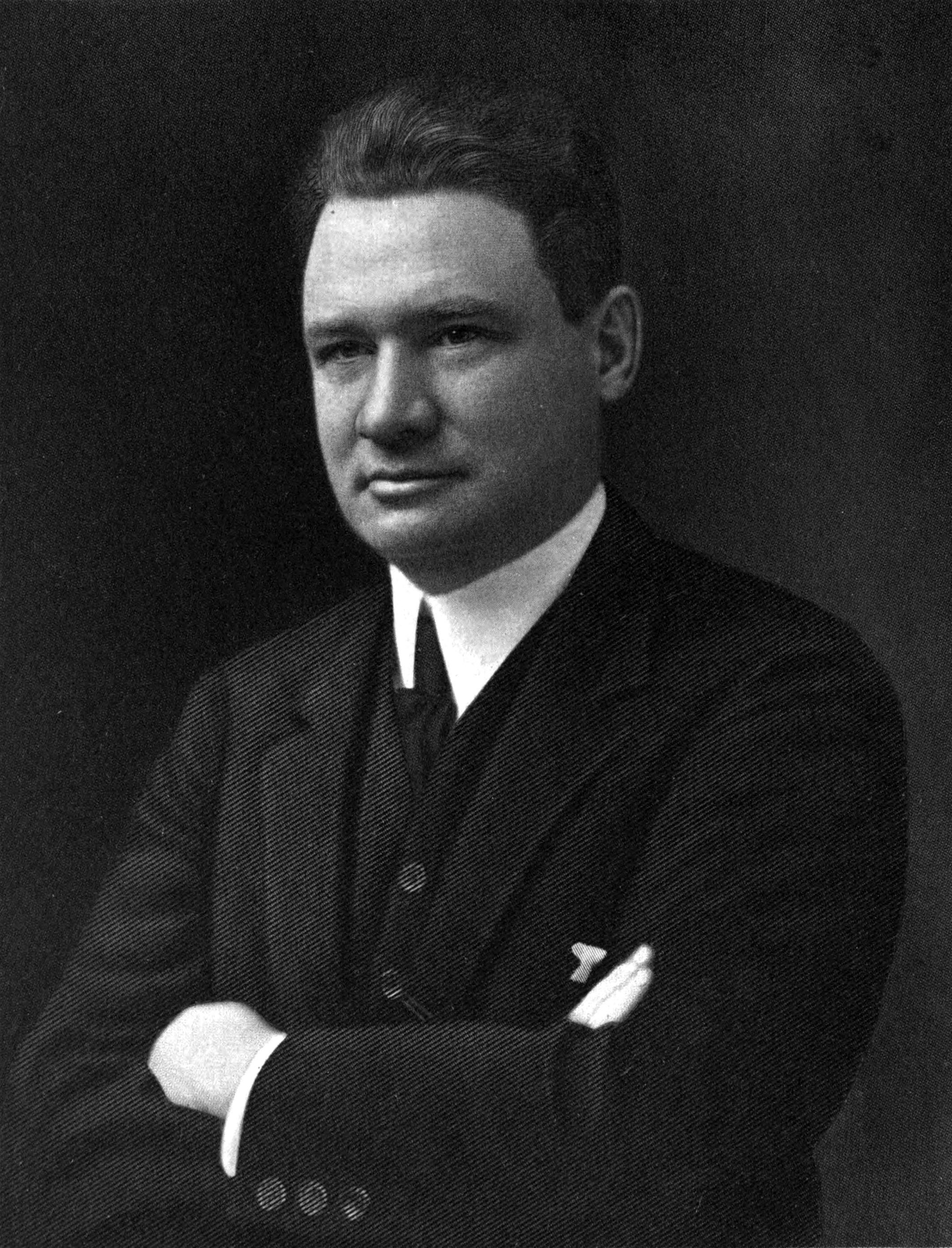

Signature
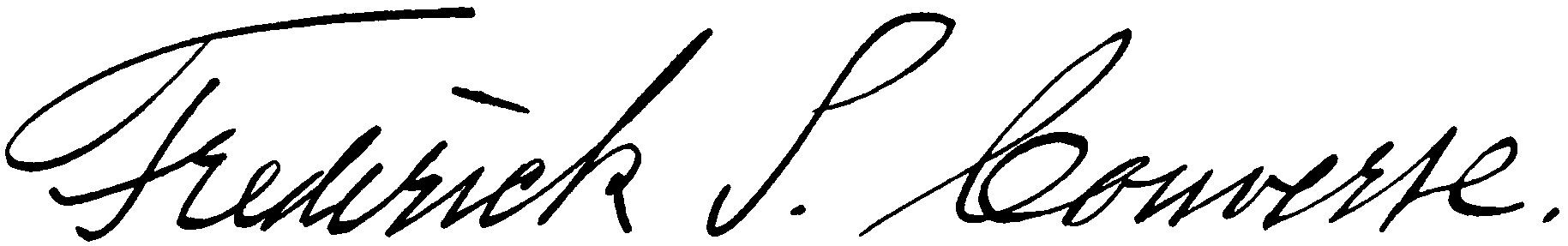

Frederick Shepherd Converse (January 5, 1871 – June 8, 1940), was an American composer of classical music, whose works include four operas and five symphonies.

== Life and career ==
Converse was born in Newton, Massachusetts, the son of Edmund Winchester and Charlotte Augusta (Shepherd) Converse. His father was a successful merchant, and president of the National Tube Works and the Conanicut Mills. Frederick Converse's higher education was at Harvard College, where he came under the influence of the composer John K. Paine. Converse had already received instruction in piano playing, and the study of musical theory was a most important part of his college course. Upon his graduation in 1893, his violin sonata (op. 1) was performed and won him highest honors in music.

After six months of business life, for which his father had intended him, he returned to the study of composing, Carl Baermann being his teacher in piano, and George W. Chadwick in composition. He then spent two years at the Royal Academy of Music in Munich, where he studied with Joseph Rheinberger, completing the course in 1898. His Symphony in D minor had its first performance on the occasion of his graduation.

During 1899–1902, Converse taught harmony at the New England Conservatory of Music in Boston. He then joined the faculty of Harvard University as instructor in music, and was appointed assistant professor in 1905. Two years later he resigned, and afterwards devoted himself exclusively to composition.

Among Converse's notable students were Alan Hovhaness, Florence Price (1888–1953), and Hisato Ohzawa (1907-1953). See: List of music students by teacher: C to F#Frederick Converse. He died in Westwood, Massachusetts.

== Family ==
He married, 6 June 1894, Emma Tudor, daughter of Frederic Tudor of Brookline, Massachusetts. They had seven children,.

- Louise Emma Converse (1895–1974). Married Junius Spencer Morgan III.
- Charlotte Augusta Converse (1896–1979). Married Samuel Endicott Peabody (1894-1959), a grandson of Samuel Endicott Peabody. Married Donald Merriam McElwain.
- Marie Tudor Converse (1897-1986)
- Virginia Converse (1900–1995). Married Paul Codman Cabot.
- Frederick Shepherd Converse Jr. (1903–1910), died young
- Elizabeth Converse (1904-1987). Married Dr. Sumner Meade Roberts in 1927.
- Edmund Winchester Converse II (1915–1920), died young

== Compositions ==
Even though he was firmly committed to composing in the late Romantic idiom of his European contemporaries, his works often dealt with American subjects. The lush orchestral scoring of his program music has been compared to the early style of Richard Strauss. In 1910, Converse's opera The Pipe of Desire became the first American work ever to be performed at the Metropolitan Opera in New York. Today, Converse is best known for his symphonic poem The Mystic Trumpeter (1904), based on the poem of the same name from Walt Whitman's iconic anthology, Leaves of Grass.

=== With opus number ===
- Sonata for violin and piano, Op. 1 (pub. 1900)
- Suite for piano Op. 2
- String quartet No. 1, Op. 3
- Waltzes for piano 4-hands Op. 4
- Valzer poetici, Op.5, for piano 4-hands (1896)
- Youth, Op. 6, concert overture for orchestra
- Symphony in D minor, Op. 7 (not counted by Converse with his later symphonies)
- Festival of Pan, Op. 9 (first performed by the Boston Symphony Orch., 1899, and by the Queen's Hall Orch. in London, England, 1905.)
- Endymion's Narrative, Op. 10
- Night and Day, Op. 11, two poems for piano and orchestra, suggested by verses by Whitman
- La Belle Dame sans Merci, Op. 12, ballad for baritone and orchestra (words by Keats)
- Violin concerto, Op. 13
- Euphrosyne, concert overture for orchestra, Op. 16
- String Quartet No. 2, Op. 18 (1905), dedicated to the Kneisel Quartet
- The Mystic Trumpeter, Op. 19, orchestral fantasy after Whitman (1904)
- Iolan or The Pipe of Desire, Op. 21, romantic opera in one act, text by George Edward Barton. It has a legendary subject, of Celtic origin, based upon the mingling of the old pagan nature worship and the incoming Christian morality. The story rests upon the principle that man may force the way of his desires against the divine order but that he pays the penalty. The work is an avowed fantasy. First produced January 31, 1906, Jordan Hall, Boston, Massachusetts in 1906, and in 1909 was the first opera by an American composer to be presented at the 'old' Metropolitan Opera House. Winner of the Bispham Memorial Medal Award.
- Laudate Domine, Op. 22, motet for male chorus, organ, and brasses
- Jeanne d'Arc Op. 23, overture, entr'actes and incidental music to Percy MacKaye's play
- Job, Op. 24, a dramatic poem for solo voices, chorus and orchestra
- Serenade, Op. 25, for soprano solo, male chorus, and small orchestra
- Hagar in der Wüste, Op. 26, dramatic narrative for contralto and orchestra
- The Sacrifice, Op. 27, opera in three acts (1910), book by Converse, lyrics by John Albert Macy after Los Gringos, or an Interior View of Mexico and California, with Wanderings in Peru, Chile, and Polynesia by Lieutenant Henry Augustus Wise, writing as "Harry Gringo". The scene is laid in California at the time of the Mexican War, and the characters, some of whom are Americans, enact a modern tragedy.
- Three songs for medium voice, Op. 28
- Melody for violin and piano, Op. 29
- Ormazd, Op. 30, symphonic poem for full orchestra

Converse largely ceased numbering his works after Op. 30 except for the arrangement for band of Laudate Domine (Op. 32), My wish (Op. 61), Haul Away, Joe!, Op. 91, and Symphony Nr. 6. op. 107.

=== Without opus number ===
- Symphony in C minor (written 1919, premiered February 1920 by the Boston Symphony)
- Festival Scenes
- Symphony in E minor (fp 1923)
- Symphony in F major (written 1934)
- Symphony #6 in F minor (completed March 1940, premiered after his death by the Indianapolis Symphony in November 1940)

———

- Sonata for cello & piano
- Silent Noon, reverie for cello and piano (1906)
- Beauty and the Beast, or Sinbad the Sailor, His Adventures with Beauty and the Peacock Lady in the Castle of the Forty Thieves, opera, libretto by Percy MacKaye (1913) (unperformed)
- The Immigrants, opera, libretto by Percy MacKaye (composed 1914) (Planned for the Boston Opera Company's 1914-15 season but unperformed because of the collapse of the company)
- Song of the World Adventurers, words by Percy MacKaye, chorus for mixed voices (part of the Music for the Masque of St. Louis) (pub. 1914)
- The Peace Pipe, cantata for baritone solo, chorus and orchestra, words from Hiawatha by Henry Wadsworth Longfellow (1915)
- Flivver Ten Million (A Joyous Epic Inspired by the Familiar Legend "The Ten Millionth Ford is Now Serving Its Owner"), tone poem for orchestra (1927), which calls for car horns in the score.
- American Sketches, for orchestra (Manhattan, The Father of Waters, Chicken Reel, Bright Angel Trail)
- Elegia Poem
- Tone poem Prophecy, biblical symphony commissioned by Serge Koussevitsky, written for the Boston Symphony Orchestra and Russian soprano Beata Malkin and dedicated to her (1932).
- Piano Sonata No. 1 (1937)
- Rhapsody for clarinet and orchestra (1938)
