= Horatio Parker =

American composer and teacher (1863–1919)

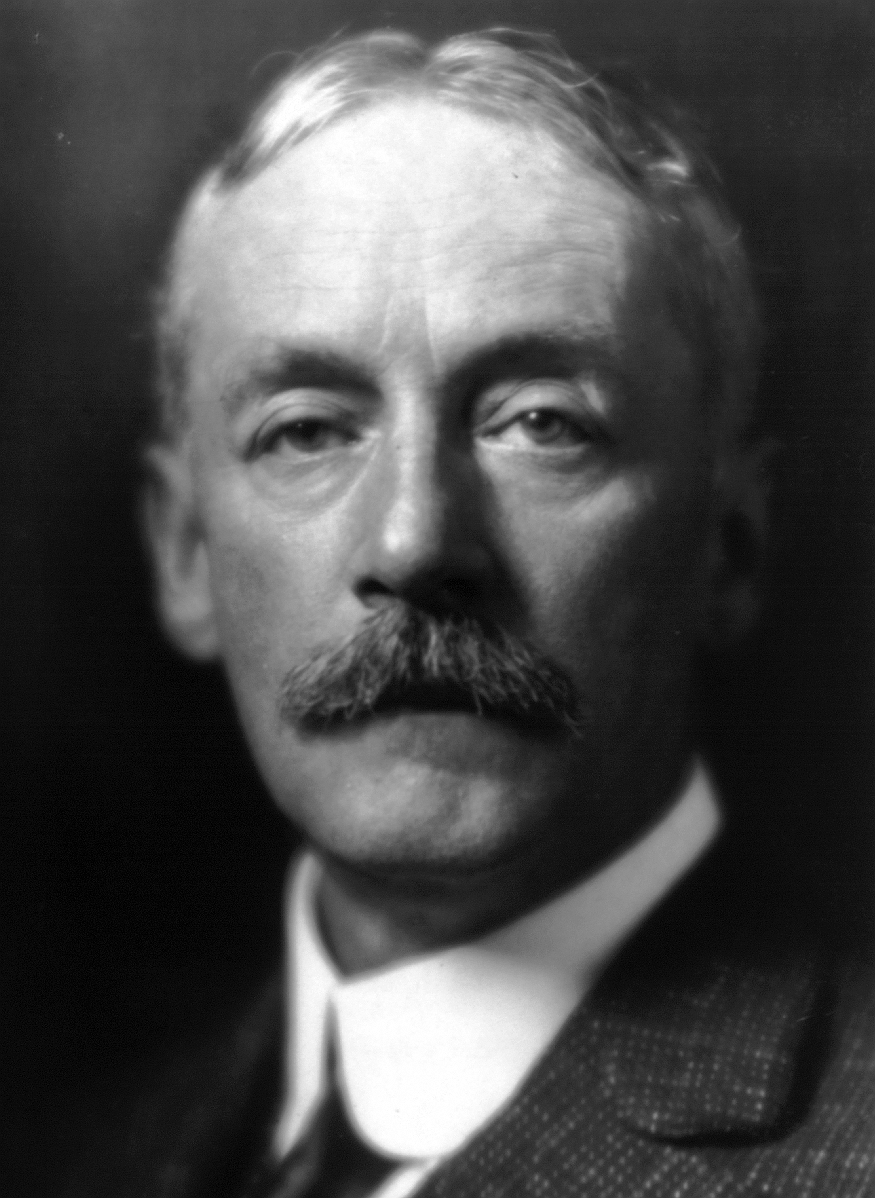
- Born: September 15, 1863; Auburndale, Massachusetts
- Died: December 18, 1919 (aged 56); Cedarhurst, New York
- Education: Royal Music School
- Occupations: Composer and teacher

Horatio William Parker (September 15, 1863 – December 18, 1919) was an American composer, organist and teacher. He was a central figure in musical life in New Haven, Connecticut in the late 19th century, and is best remembered as the undergraduate teacher of Charles Ives while the composer attended Yale University.

== Biography ==
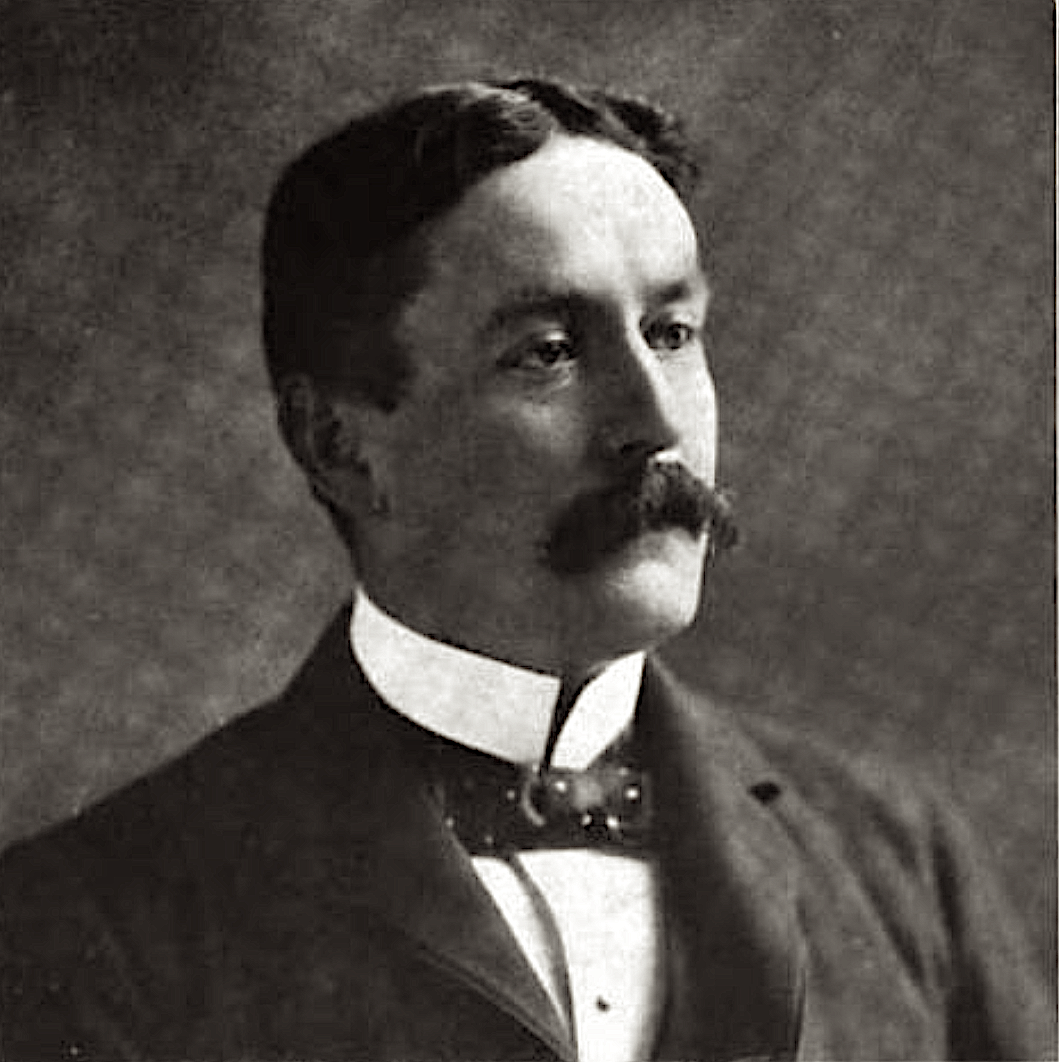
Horatio Parke

He was born in Auburndale, Massachusetts. His earliest lessons were with his mother. He then studied in Boston with George Whitefield Chadwick, Stephen A. Emery, and John Orth. His first professional position was playing the organ at St. Paul's Episcopal Church in Dedham, Massachusetts. He was paid a salary of roughly $300 a year from September 1880 to January 1882.

He finished his formal education in Europe, a common destination for a young American composer in the 1880s, where he studied in Munich with Josef Rheinberger. His fellow students at the Royal Music School in Munich included Arthur Whiting and H. H. Huss. In Munich Parker composed his first significant works, including a symphony and a dramatic cantata. He also premiered Joseph Rheinberger's Organ Concerto No. 1 in F Major from 1884 there.

After his return to the United States in 1885, he was for two years professor of music in the Cathedral School of St. Paul in Garden City, Long Island. From 1888 to 1893, he was organist of Trinity Church, New York City, and from 1893 to 1901 organist of Trinity Church, Boston. In 1893, Parker became Battell Professor of the theory of music at Yale University. He was appointed Dean of Music at that school in 1904, a position which he held for the rest of his life.

The University of Cambridge bestowed on him the honorary degree Doctor of Music (Mus.Doc.) in May 1902. He directed the Derby Choral Club, organized by Frances Osborne Kellogg in Derby, Connecticut, for 16 consecutive seasons until his death. On December 30, 1915, he was elected as a national honorary member of Phi Mu Alpha Sinfonia fraternity, the national fraternity for men in music. Parker died in Cedarhurst, New York.

Parker was the uncle of Parker Bailey, who was an American composer, pianist, and lawyer. Bailey served for a time as a lawyer at the Securities and Exchange Commission having graduated from Yale in 1923 with majors in Greek and mathematics, but remained active as a composer for much of his life. He won the Joseph H Stearns prize at Columbia University in 1928 for his Sonata in A Flat Major for flute and piano.

== Composition ==
Before leaving New York City in 1893, Parker had completed his oratorio, Hora Novissima, set to the opening words of De contemptu mundi by Bernard of Cluny. It was widely performed in America; and also in England, in 1899 at Chester, and at the Three Choirs Festival at Worcester, the latter an honour never before paid an American composer. European critics called it one of the finest of American compositions. While he is mostly remembered for this single work, he was a prolific and versatile composer in a mostly conservative Germanic tradition, writing two operas, songs, organ and incidental music, and a copious quantity of works for chorus and orchestra. Influences in his compositions include Mendelssohn, Brahms, Wagner, as well as Debussy and Elgar in some works which he composed closer to 1900.

In 1892, Parker composed the hymn tune "Auburndale" in celebration of the laying of the cornerstone of the new church building of the Episcopal parish he was baptised in, Parish of the Messiah. His father, Charles Edward Parker, had been the architect for that congregation's chapel; famed Episcopal bishop Phillips Brooks laid the cornerstone. "Auburndale" was later published in the 1916 Hymnal ("The Messiah Miracle: A History The Church of the Messiah of West Newton and Auburndale 1871–1971," privately published, 1971).

Parker entered his opera, Mona, into a contest at the Metropolitan Opera winning the prize for best composition in 1911. He $10,000 and his opera was performed by the company. Mona premiered on March 14, 1912 and ran for four performances. The title role was taken by Louise Homer. He also won the Los Angeles $10,000 prize for his opera Fairyland.

Parker's music is used as Hymn #66 "Rejoice the Lord is King" in the hymnbook for The Church of Jesus Christ of Latter-Day Saints (with lyrics by Charles Wesley, 1707-1788). The hymn uses the JUBILATE tune and has been in the church's hymnbook since 1948.

== Works ==
=== Choral ===
- King Trojan (1885)
- The Kobolds
- Harold Harfagar (1891)
- Hora Novissima, Op. 30 (1893)
- The Holy Child, Op. 37 (1893)
- The Legend of Saint Christopher, Op.43 (1898)
- A Wanderer's Psalm, Op. 50 (1900)
- A Star Song, Op. 54, (1902)
- The Shepherds' Vision, Op. 63
- Morven and the Grail, Op. 79, an oratorio written for the centenary celebration of the Handel and Haydn Society (1915)
- In Heavenly Love Abiding

=== Operas ===
- Mona, Op. 71 (1912)
- Fairyland, Op. 77 (1915)

=== Orchestral works ===
- Concert Overture in E, Op. 4 (1884)
- Regulus, Overture héroïque, Op. 5 (1884)
- Venetian Overture in B, Op. 12 (1884)
- Scherzo in g, Op. 13 (1884)
- Symphony in C, Op. 7 (1885)
- Count Robert of Paris, Overture, Op. 24b (1890)
- A Northern Ballad, Op. 46 (1899)
- Organ Concerto in E-flat minor, Op. 55 (1902)
- Vathek, Op. 56 (1903)
- Collegiate Overture, Op. 72, with male chorus (1911)
- Fairyland Suite, Op. 77d (1915)

=== Orchestral songs ===
- Cahal Mor of the Wine-Red Hand, Op. 40 (1893)
- Crepuscule, Op. 64 (1912)
- The Red Cross Spirit Speaks (J. Finley), Op. 83 (1917)
- A. D. 1919, A Commemorative Poem by Brian Hooker Set to Music by Horatio Parker (op.84) ["Published in Memory of the Two Hundred and Twenty-one Yale Men who Gave their Lives in the World War and in Recognition of the Service Rendered to the Allies by the Eight Thousand Yale Men who Responded to the Call to Arms"] - Published by Yale University Press in 1919.

=== Organ ===
- Geschwindmarsch for 2 Organists (1881)
- 4 Compositions, Op. 17 (1890) : 1. Concert Piece No 1 - 2. Impromptu - 3. Romanza - 4. ...
- 4 Compositions, Op. 20 (1891) : 1. Melody and Intermezzo - 2. Wedding-Song - 3. ... - 4. Fantasie
- 4 Compositions, Op. 28 (1891) : 1. ... - 2. Concert Piece No 2 - 3. Pastorella - 4. ...
- 5 Sketches, Op. 32 (1893)
- 4 Compositions, Op. 36 (1893) : 1. Canzonetta - 2. ... - 3. Fugue - 4. Eglogue
- 3 Compositions (1896)
- Organ Sonata in E flat minor, Op. 65 (1908)
- 4 Compositions, Op. 66 (1910) : 1. Festival Prelude - 2. Revery - 3. Postlude - 4. Scherzino
- 5 Short Pieces, Op. 68 (1908)1. Canon In the Fifth - 2. Slumber-Song - 3. Novelette - 4. Arietta - 5. Risoluto
- Introduction and Fugue in e (1916)

=== Chamber music ===
- String Quartet in F, Op, 11 (1885)
- Suite for Piano Trio Op. 35 (1893)
- String Quintet in d, Op. 38 (1894)
- Suite in e, Op. 41 for Violin and Piano (1894)

=== Piano ===
- Präsentirmarsch for 4 hands
- 5 Morceaux caractéristiques, Op. 9 (1886)
- 4 Sketches, Op. 19 (1890)
- 6 Lyrics, Op. 23 (1891)
- 2 Compositions (1895)
- 3 Morceaux caractéristiques, Op. 49 (1899)
