= Enrico Caruso discography =

The following discography contains all known published recordings by Enrico Caruso. The recordings are listed chronologically by recording date, title, composer and matrix number. Occasionally, multiple takes of the same selection (usually, but not always, recorded during the same session) have been issued. When more than one take was published for a particular selection, all of the published take numbers are listed chronologically, following the matrix number. If only one take was issued, no take number is listed after the matrix number. Matrix numbers should not be confused with catalog numbers.

A discography of select Caruso collections issued on Long Play records and Compact disc follows the main discography.

== Recordings ==
Matrix number	Company	Location	Date	Composer	Work	With	Notes
1782	Gramophone & Typewriter Co. Ltd.	Milan	1902-04-11	Franchetti	Germania: Studenti! Udite	Salvatore Cottone, on the piano.	
1783	Gramophone & Typewriter Co. Ltd.	Milan	1902-04-11	Verdi	Rigoletto: Questa o quella	Salvatore Cottone, p	
1784	Gramophone & Typewriter Co. Ltd.	Milan	1902-04-11	Verdi	Aïda: Celeste Aïda	Salvatore Cottone, p	
1785	Gramophone & Typewriter Co. Ltd.	Milan	1902-04-11	Massenet	Manon: Chiudo gli occhi (Il sogno)	Salvatore Cottone, p	
1786	Gramophone & Typewriter Co. Ltd.	Milan	1902-04-11	Donizetti	L'elisir d'amore: Una furtiva lagrima	Salvatore Cottone, p	
1787	Gramophone & Typewriter Co. Ltd.	Milan	1902-04-11	Boito	Mefistofele: Giunto sul passo estremo	Salvatore Cottone, p	
1788	Gramophone & Typewriter Co. Ltd.	Milan	1902-04-11	Franchetti	Germania: No, non ciuder gli occhi vaghi	Salvatore Cottone, p	
1789	Gramophone & Typewriter Co. Ltd.	Milan	1902-04-11	Boito	Mefistofele: Dai campi, dai prati	Salvatore Cottone, p	
1790	Gramophone & Typewriter Co. Ltd.	Milan	1902-04-11	Puccini	Tosca: E lucevan le stelle	Salvatore Cottone, p	
1791	Gramophone & Typewriter Co. Ltd.	Milan	1902-04-11	Mascagni	Iris: Apri la tua finestra (serenata)	Salvatore Cottone, p	
2871	Gramophone & Typewriter Co. Ltd.	Milan	1902-11-30	Boito	Mefistofele: Dai campi, dai prati	Salvatore Cottone, p	
2872	Gramophone & Typewriter Co. Ltd.	Milan	1902-11-30	Giordano	Fedora: Amor ti vieta	Salvatore Cottone, p	
2873	Gramophone & Typewriter Co. Ltd.	Milan	1902-11-30	Verdi	Aïda: Celeste Aïda	Salvatore Cottone, p	
2874	Gramophone & Typewriter Co. Ltd.	Milan	1902-11-30	Ponchielli	Gioconda: Cielo e mar	Salvatore Cottone, p	
2875	Gramophone & Typewriter Co. Ltd.	Milan	1902-11-30	Leoncavallo	Pagliacci: Vesti la giubba	Salvatore Cottone, p	
2876	Gramophone & Typewriter Co. Ltd.	Milan	1902-11-30	Mascagni	Cavalleria rusticana: O Lola (Siciliana)	Salvatore Cottone, p	
2877	Gramophone & Typewriter Co. Ltd.	Milan	1902-11-30	Denza	Non t'amo più	Salvatore Cottone, p	
2879	Gramophone & Typewriter Co. Ltd.	Milan	1902-12	Tosti	La mia canzone	Salvatore Cottone, p	
2880	Gramophone & Typewriter Co. Ltd.	Milan	1902-12	Cilea	Adriana Lecouvreur: No, piú nobile	Cilea, p	
2882	Gramophone & Typewriter Co. Ltd.	Milan	1902-12	Denza	Luna fedel	Salvatore Cottone, p	
X-1550	Anglo-Italian Commerce Co.	Milan	1903-04-19	Trimarchi	Un bacio ancora	unknown, p	
X-1551	Anglo-Italian Commerce Co.	Milan	1903-04-19	Denza	Luna fedel	unknown, p	
X-1552	Anglo-Italian Commerce Co.	Milan	1903-04-19	Donizetti	L'elisir d'amore: Una furtiva lagrima	unknown, p	
X-1553	Anglo-Italian Commerce Co.	Milan	1903-04-19	Puccini	Tosca: E lucevan le stelle	unknown, p	
X-1554	Anglo-Italian Commerce Co.	Milan	1903-04-19	Franchetti	Germania: No, non ciuder gli occhi vaghi	unknown, p	
X-1555	Anglo-Italian Commerce Co.	Milan	1903-04-19	Verdi	Rigoletto: La donna è mobile	unknown, p	
X-1556	Anglo-Italian Commerce Co.	Milan	1903-04-19	Mascagni	Cavalleria rusticana: O Lola (Siciliana)	unknown, p	
84003	Anglo-Italian Commerce Co.	Milan	1903-10	Pini-Corsi	Tu non mi vuoi piu ben	unknown, p	
84004	Anglo-Italian Commerce Co.	Milan	1903-10	Puccini	Tosca: E lucevan le stelle	unknown, p	
84006	Anglo-Italian Commerce Co.	Milan	1903-10	Meyerbeer	Gli Uginotti: Qui sotto il ciel	unknown, p	
B-994	Victor Talking Machine Co.	Room 826, Carnegie Hall, NY	1904-02-01	Verdi	Rigoletto: Questa o quella	unknown, p	
B-995	Victor Talking Machine Co.	Room 826, Carnegie Hall, NY	1904-02-01	Verdi	Rigoletto: La donna è mobile	unknown, p	
B-996, C-996	Victor Talking Machine Co.	Room 826, Carnegie Hall, NY	1904-02-01	Donizetti	L'elisir d'amore: Una furtiva lagrima	unknown, p	
C-997	Victor Talking Machine Co.	Room 826, Carnegie Hall, NY	1904-02-01	Verdi	Aïda: Celeste Aïda	unknown, p	
B-998	Victor Talking Machine Co.	Room 826, Carnegie Hall, NY	1904-02-01	Puccini	Tosca: E lucevan le stelle	unknown, p	
B-999	Victor Talking Machine Co.	Room 826, Carnegie Hall, NY	1904-02-01	Puccini	Tosca: Recondita armonia	unknown, p	
B-1000	Victor Talking Machine Co.	Room 826, Carnegie Hall, NY	1904-02-01	Mascagni	Cavalleria rusticana: O Lola (Siciliana)	unknown, p	
B-1002	Victor Talking Machine Co.	Room 826, Carnegie Hall, NY	1904-02-01	Leoncavallo	Pagliacci: Vesti la giubba	unknown, p	
B-1001-2	Victor Talking Machine Co.	Room 826, Carnegie Hall, NY	1904-02-09	Massenet	Manon: Chiudo gli occhi (Il sogno)	unknown, p	
268-i	Gramophone & Typewriter Co. Ltd.	Milan	1904-04-08	Bizet	Les Pêcheurs de perle: Mi par d'udir ancora	Salvatore Cottone, p	
2181-h	Gramophone & Typewriter Co. Ltd.	Milan	1904-04-08	Leoncavallo	Mattinata	Leoncavallo, p	
C-2340	Victor Talking Machine Co.	NY	1905-02-27	Donizetti	Don Pasquale: Serenata: Com'e gentil	Orch.	
C-2341	Victor Talking Machine Co.	NY	1905-02-27	Bizet	Carmen: Il fior che avevi a me tu dato	Orch.	
C-2342	Victor Talking Machine Co.	NY	1905-02-27	Meyerbeer	Gli Uginotti: Bianca al par di neve alpina	Orch.	
C-2343	Victor Talking Machine Co.	NY	1905-02-27	Ponchielli	Gioconda: Cielo e mar	Orch.	
C-2344	Victor Talking Machine Co.	NY	1905-02-27	Mascagni	Cavalleria Rusticana: Viva il vino spumeggiante (brindisi di Turiddu)	Orch.	
C-3100	Victor Talking Machine Co.	NY	1906-02-11	Flotow	Martha: M'appari tutt' amor	Orch.	
C-3101	Victor Talking Machine Co.	NY	1906-02-11	Puccini	la Bohème: Che gelida manina	Orch.	
C-3102	Victor Talking Machine Co.	NY	1906-02-11	Gounod	Faust: Salut! demeure chaste et pure	Orch.	
B-3103	Victor Talking Machine Co.	NY	1906-02-11	Verdi	Il Trovatore: Di quella pira	Orch.	
C-3104	Victor Talking Machine Co.	NY	1906-02-11	Donizetti	La Favorita: Spirito gentil, ne sogni miei	Orch.	
C-3179	Victor Talking Machine Co.	NY	1906-03-13	Verdi	La Forza del Destino: Solenne in quest'ora	Antonio Scotti	
C-3180-1	Victor Talking Machine Co.	NY	1906-03-13	Verdi	Aïda: Celeste Aïda	Orch.	not issued until 1973
C-4159	Victor Talking Machine Co.	NY	1906-12-30	Barthélemy	Triste ritorno	Orch.	
C-4162	Victor Talking Machine Co.	NY	1906-12-30	Tosti	Ideale	Orch.	
C-4160	Victor Talking Machine Co.	NY	1907-02-20	Meyerbeer	L'Africana: O Paradiso	Orch.	
C-4259	Victor Talking Machine Co.	NY	1907-02-20	Verdi	Rigoletto: Bella figlia dell'amore	Bessie Abott, Louise Homer, Antonio Scotti	
C-4315	Victor Talking Machine Co.	NY	1907-03-17	Puccini	La Bohème: O Mimì, tu più	Antonio Scotti	
C-4316	Victor Talking Machine Co.	NY	1907-03-17	Giordano	Andrea Chénier: Un dì all'azzurro	Orch.	
C-4317	Victor Talking Machine Co.	NY	1907-03-17	Leoncavallo	Pagliacci: Vesti la giubba	Orch.	
C-4326	Victor Talking Machine Co.	NY	1907-03-24	Puccini	La Bohème: O soave fanciulla	Nellie Melba	
C-4327	Victor Talking Machine Co.	NY	1907-03-24	Bizet	Les Pêcheurs de perles: Del tempio al limitar	Mario Ancona	
C-5008-1	Victor Talking Machine Co.	NY	1908-01-10	Donizetti	Don Sebastiano: Deserto in terra	Orch.	
C-5008-2	Victor Talking Machine Co.	NY	1908-01-10	Donizetti	Don Sebastiano: Deserto in terra	Orch.	
C-5009	Victor Talking Machine Co.	NY	1908-01-10	Barthélemy	Adorables tourments	Orch.	
C-5052-5	Victor Talking Machine Co.	NY	1908-02-07	Donizetti	Lucia di Lammermoor: Sextet: Chi mi frena	Marcella Sembrich, Gina Severina, Antonio Scotti, Marcel Journet, Francesco Daddi	
C-5053-3	Victor Talking Machine Co.	NY	1908-02-07	Verdi	Rigoletto: Quartet: Bella figlia de	Marcella Sembrich, Gina Severina, Antonio Scotti	https://archive.org/details/78_bella-figlia-dell-amore-fairest-daughter-of-the-graces_caruso-sembrich-scotti-se_gbia0105065a
C-6025	Victor Talking Machine Co.	NY	1908-03-10	Puccini	La Bohème: Addio, dolce svegliare	Geraldine Farrar, Gina Viafora, Antonio Scotti	https://www.loc.gov/item/jukebox-126132/
C-6026	Victor Talking Machine Co.	NY	1908-03-10	Puccini	Madama Butterfly: O quanti occhi fisi	Geraldine Farrar	
C6032	Victor Talking Machine Co.	Camden, NJ	1908-03-16	Buzzi-Peccia	Lolita		https://www.loc.gov/item/jukebox-126152/
C6033	Victor Talking Machine Co.	Camden	1908-03-16	Verdi	Rigoletto: La donna è mobile		https://www.loc.gov/item/jukebox-126158/
C-6034	Victor Talking Machine Co.	Camden	1908-03-16	Verdi	Il Trovatore: Ah sì, ben mio		https://www.enricocaruso.dk/musicdetails.php?mid=217
C-6035	Victor Talking Machine Co.	Camden	1908-03-16	Verdi	Rigoletto: Questa o quella		https://www.loc.gov/item/jukebox-126167/
C-6036-1	Victor Talking Machine Co.	Camden	1908-03-17	Verdi	Il Trovatore: Ai nostri monti	Louise Homer	https://archive.org/details/78_ai-nostri-monti_caruso-und-homer-verdi_gbia7003458a/Ai+nostri+monti+-+CARUSO+und+HOMER+-+Verdi.flac
C-3180-3	Victor Talking Machine Co.	Camden	1908-03-29	Verdi	Aïda: Celeste Aida		https://archive.org/details/78_celeste-aida_signor-caruso-verdi_gbia7003462a/CELESTE+AIDA+-+SIGNOR+CARUSO+-+Verdi.flac

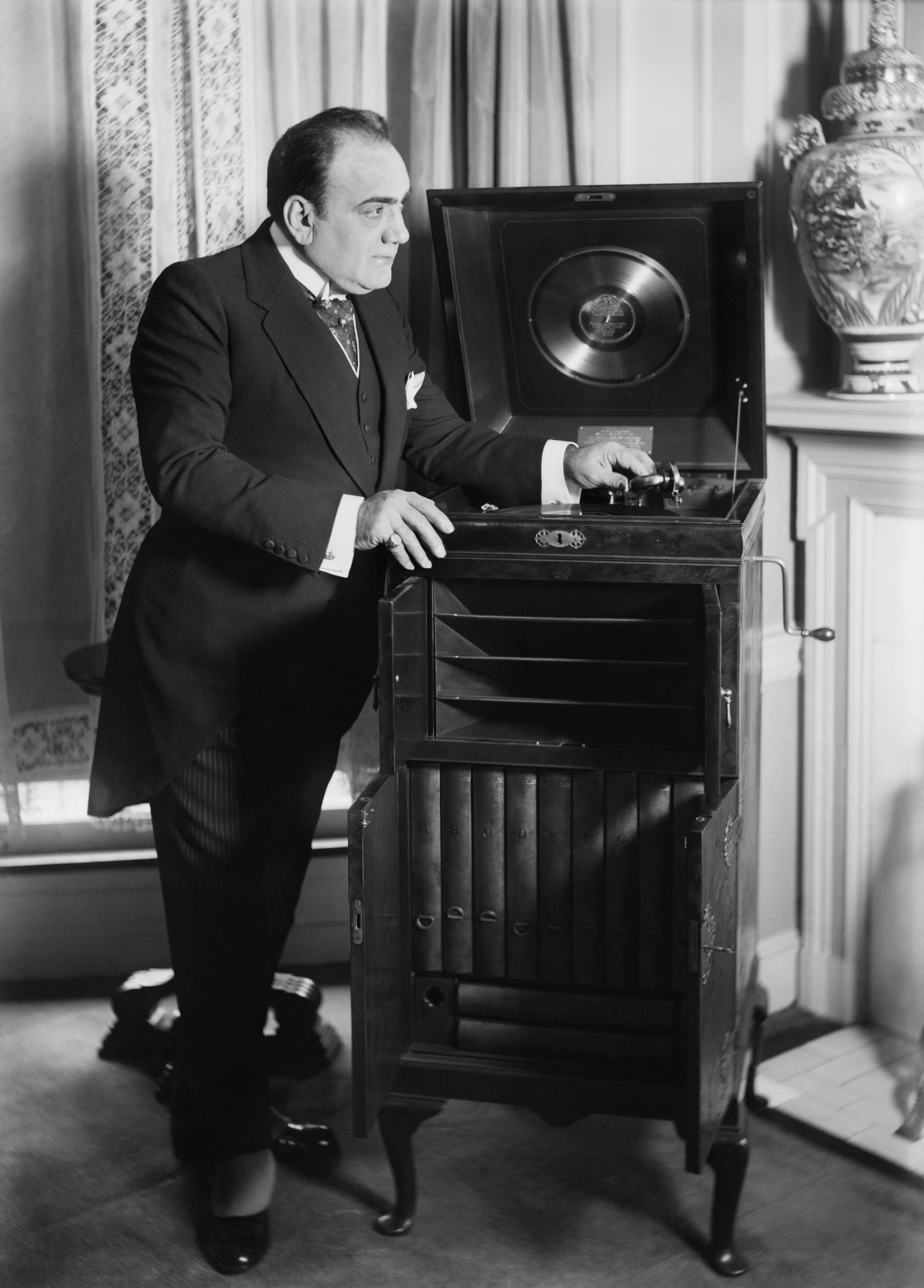
Enrico Caruso with a custom Victrola

=== 19 December 1908 ===
New York

- Il trovatore (Verdi) Mal reggendo with Louise Homer C-6682

=== 6 November 1909 ===
Camden

- Pour un baiser (Tosti) B-8343
- Mamma mia, che vò sape? (Nutile) C-8344
- La forza del destino (Verdi) O tu che in seno agli angeli C-8345
- Tosca (Puccini) E lucevan le stelle B-8346
- Tosca (Puccini) Recondita armonia B-8347
- Aida (Verdi) O terra addio with Johanna Gadski C-8348

=== 7 November 1909 ===
Camden

- The Queen of Sheba (Goldmark) Magiche note B-6062
- Carmen (Bizet) Flower Song C-8349 (Italian)
- Carmen (Bizet) Flower Song C-8350 (French)
- Gli Ugonotti (Meyerbeer) Bianca al par di neve Alpina C-8351
- Aida (Verdi) La fatal pietra with Johanna Gadski C-8353

=== 27 December 1909 ===
Camden

- Il trovatore (Verdi) Miserere with Frances Alda C-8506-1

=== 6 January 1910 ===
New York

- Il Trovatore (Verdi) Miserere with Frances Alda & Metropolitan Opera Chorus C-8506-3
- Faust (Gounod) Il se fait tard (Laisse-moi) with Geraldine Farrar C-8533
- Faust (Gounod) Eternelle with Geraldine Farrar C-8534

=== 12 January 1910 ===
New York

- Faust (Gounod) Mon coeur est pénétré d'épouvante (Prison Scene Part 1) with Geraldine Farrar C-8542
- Faust (Gounod) Attends! Voici la rue (Prison Scene Part 2) with Geraldine Farrar C-8543
- Faust (Gounod) Seigneur Dieu! with Geraldine Farrar, Marcel Journet, Gabrielle Lejeune-Gilibert C-8544
- Faust (Gounod) Alerte! Où vous êtes perdus (Prison Scene Part 3) with Geraldine Farrar, Marcel Journet C-8545
- Martha (Flotow) Solo, profugo with Marcel Journet C-8546
- Faust (Gounod) Eh quoi, toujours seule with Geraldine Farrar, Marcel Journet, Gabrielle Lejeune-Gilibert C-8547

=== 16 January 1910 ===
New York

- Faust (Gounod) O merveille! with Marcel Journet C-8555
- Faust (Gounod) Que voulez-vous, messieurs? with Marcel Journet, Antonio Scotti C-8556

=== 14 March 1910 ===
New York

- Germania (Franchetti) Studenti, udite! B-8710
- Madama Butterfly (Puccini) Amore o grillo with Antonio Scotti C-8711
- Madama Butterfly (Puccini) Non ve l'avevo detto? (Vel lo dissi?) with Antonio Scotti C-8712
- Germania (Franchetti) No, non chiuder gli occhi vaghi B-8713
- La gioconda (Ponchielli) Cielo e mar C-8718

=== 28 December 1910 ===
Camden

- I pagliacci (Leoncavallo) No! Pagliaccio non son! C-9742
- Otello (Verdi) Ora e per sempre addio B-9743
- For you alone (O'Reilly-Geehl) B-9744
- Cavalleria rusticana (Mascagni) Siciliana B-9745

=== 29 December 1910 ===
Camden

- Il Trovatore (Verdi) Ai nostri monti with Louise Homer C-6036-2
- Good bye (Tosti) C-9747
- Aida (Verdi) Gia i sacerdoti adunansi with Louise Homer C-9748
- Aida (Verdi) Aida a me togliesti with Louise Homer C-9749

=== 19 November 1911 ===
Camden

- Un ballo in maschera (Verdi) Di tu se fedele B-11270
- Eternamente (Mazzoni-Mascheroni) C-11271
- La bohème (Leoncavallo) Testa adorata C-11272
- Lo schiavo (Gomes) Quando nascesti tu C-11273
- Core 'ngrato (Cordiferro-Cardillo) C-11274

=== 26 November 1911 ===
Camden

- La bohème (Leoncavallo) Io non ho che una povera stanzetta C-11276
- La forza del destino (Verdi) Invano, Alvaro! with Pasquale Amato C-11286
- La forza del destino (Verdi) Le minaccie, i fieri accenti with Pasquale Amato C-11286
- Canta pe' me (Bovio-De Curtis) B-11306

=== 27 December 1911 ===
Camden

- Love is Mine (Gartner) B-11419
- Un ballo in maschera (Verdi) Ma se m'è forza perderti C-11420
- Manon (Massenet) Ah! fuyez, douce image C-11422
- Aida (Verdi) Se quel guerrier io fossi...Celeste Aida C-11423

=== 7 January 1912 ===
New York

- Martha (Flotow) Siam giunti, o giovinette with Frances Alda, Josephine Jacoby, Marcel Journet C-11437
- Martha (Flotow) Che vuol dir ciò with Frances Alda, Josephine Jacoby, Marcel Journet C-11438
- Martha (Flotow) Presto, presto with Frances Alda, Josephine Jacoby, Marcel Journet C-11439
- Martha (Flotow) Quartetto notturno with Frances Alda, Josephine Jacoby, Marcel Journet C-11440
- I Lombardi (Verdi) Qual volutta trascorrere with Frances Alda, Marcel Journet C-11441
- Crucifix (Faure) with Marcel Journet C-11442

=== 19 January 1912 ===
New York

- Lucia di Lammermoor (Donizetti) Sextet: Chi mi frena with Luisa Tetrazzini, Pasquale Amato, Marcel Journet, Josephine Jacoby, Angelo Badà C-11446
- Tarantella sincera (de Crescenzo) C-11472

=== 13 February 1912 ===
New York

- Rigoletto (Verdi) Quartet: Bella figlia dell' amore with Luisa Tetrazzini, Pasquale Amato, Josephine Jacoby C-11447
- La danza (Pepoli-Rossini) C-11590

=== 18 April 1912 ===
Camden

- Dreams of Long ago (Carroll-Caruso) C-11616

=== 29 April 1912 ===
Camden

- The Lost Chord (Proctor-Sullivan) C-11942

=== 7 December 1912 ===
New York

- Because (Teschemacher-d'Hardelot) B-12680
- Hosanna (Granier) C-12681

=== 30 December 1912 ===
New York

- Manon (Massenet) On l'appelle Manon with Geraldine Farrar C-12750
- Don Carlos (Verdi) Dio che nell' alma infondere with Antonio Scotti C-12752

=== 17 January 1913 ===
New York

- Il trovatore (Verdi) Ai nostri monti with Ernestine Schumann-Heink C-12804
- Pimpinella (Tchaikovsky) B-12805

=== 24 February 1913 ===
New York

- Rigoletto (Verdi) Parmi veder le lagrime C-11421
- Agnus Dei (Bizet) C-12942
- Manon Lescaut (Puccini) Donna non vidi mai B-12945

=== 20 March 1913 ===
New York

- Ave Maria with Mischa Elman, violin (Kahn) C-13004
- Élégie (Song of Mourning) with Mischa Elman, violin, Percy B. Kahn, piano (Massenet) C-13005

=== 10 April 1913 ===
New York

- Lasciati amar (Leoncavallo) B-13104
- Guardann' a luna (De Crescenzo) B-13105
- Your eyes have told me what I did not know (Bowles-O'Hara) B-13106
- Fenesta che lucive (Anonymous) C-13107

=== 15 December 1913 ===
New York

- Stabat mater (Rossini) Cujus animam C-14200
- Les rameaux (J.Faure) C-14201-2
- Cavalleria rusticana (Mascagni) Addio alla madre C-14202

=== 8 January 1914 ===
New York

- Otello (Verdi) Si pel ciel with Titta Ruffo C-14272

=== 21 January 1914 ===
New York

- Sérénade de Don Juan (Tchaikovsky) B-14355
- Amor mio (Gaeta-Ricciardi) B-14356
- Manella mia (Valente) C-14358

=== 9 March 1914 ===
New York

- Les rameaux (J.Faure) C-14201-3
- Trusting Eyes (Gartner) B-14203
- Serenade espagnole (Ronald) B-14359
- Parted (Tosti) B-14550

=== 3 April 1914 ===
New York

- Un ballo in maschera (Verdi) La rivedra nell'estasi with Frieda Hempel, Léon Rothier, Andrés de Segurola C-14659
- Un ballo in maschera (Verdi) E scherzo od è follia with Frieda Hempel, Léon Rothier, Andrés de Segurola, Maria Duchêne C-14660
- La partida (Alvarez) C-14661
- El Milagro de la virgen, (Chapí) Flores purisimas C-14662

=== 20 April 1914 ===
New York

- La traviata (Verdi) Brindisi with Alma Gluck B-14729
- Il guarany (Gomes) Sento una forza indomita with Emmy Destinn C-14730

=== 10 December 1914 ===
New York

- Hantise d'amour (Rey-Roize-Szulc) B-14357
- Carmen (Bizet) Parle-moi de ma mere with Frances Alda B-15483-3,2

=== 7 January 1915 ===
New York

- La mia canzone (Tosti) B-15481
- Pe'che? (Pennino-Flaviis) C-15568
- Cielo turchino (Capaldo-Ciociano) B-15569
- Requiem (Verdi) Ingemisco C-15570
- Il Duca d'alba (Donizetti): Angelo casto e bel C-15572

=== 6 February 1915 ===
New York

- Si vous l'aviez compris with Mischa Elman, violin (Denza) C-15682
- Les deux serenades with Mischa Elman, violin (Leoncavallo) C-15683

=== 5 February 1916 ===
Camden

- La procession (Franck) C-17121
- Le Cid (Massenet) O souverain, ô juge, ô pere C-17122
- Luna d'estate (Tosti) B-17123
- 'O sole mio (di Capua) B-17124
- La reine de Saba (Gounod) Inspirez-moi, race devine C-17125

=== 23 February 1916 ===
Camden

- Mia sposa sara la mia bandiera (Rotoli) C-17195
- Macbeth (Verdi) Ah, la paterna mano C-17197
- La bohème (Puccini) Vecchia zimarra B-17198
- Cantique de Noël (Adam) C-17218

=== 20 March 1916 ===
New York

- Sancta Maria (Faure) C-17342
- Tiempo antico (Caruso) C-17343
- Santa Lucia (Cottrau) C-17344

=== 3 November 1916 ===
New York

- Pourquoi? (Tchaikovsky) B-18656
- Eugen Onegin (Tchaikovsky) Lenski's air C-18657
- Chanson de Juin, Op. 102, No. 6 (Barrucand-Godard) C-18658
- Andrea Chénier (Giordano) Come un bel dì di maggio B-18659

=== 7 December 1916 ===
Camden

- Samson et Dalila (Saint-Saëns) Vois ma misère, hélas! With Metropolitan Opera Chorus C-18821
- Les Pêcheurs de perles (Bizet) Je crois entendre encore C-18822
- Les Pêcheurs de perles (Bizet) De mon amie B-18823

=== 25 January 1917 ===
Camden

- Rigoletto (Verdi) Quartet: Bella figlia dell' amore (fragment - opening tenor solo only) No matrix number.
- Rigoletto (Verdi) Quartet: Bella figlia dell' amore with Amelita Galli-Curci, Flora Perini and Giuseppe De Luca C-19132
- Lucia di Lammermoor (Donizetti) Sextet: Chi mi frena with Amelita Galli-Curci, Giuseppe De Luca, Marcel Journet, Minnie Egener, Angelo Badà C-19133-2,1

=== 15 April 1917 ===
New York

- Martha (Flotow) M'appari tutt' amor C-3100-2
- Musica proibita (Gastaldon) C-15480
- Uocchie celeste (Gill-de Crescenzo) C-19483
- L'alba separa dalla luce l'ombra (D'Annunzio-Tosti) B-19484-2,1
- Nero (Rubinstein) O Lumiere du jour C-19485-2,1

=== 16 April 1918 ===
Camden

- A la luz de la luna (Michelena) with Emilio de Gogorza C-21773
- Sei Morta Nella Vita Mia (Costa) with Gaetano Scognamillo, piano C-21774

=== 10 July 1918 ===
Camden

- La Partida (Alvarez) C-22122
- La forza del destino (Verdi) Sleale! Il segreto fu dunque violato? with Giuseppe De Luca C-22123

=== 11 July 1918 ===
Camden

- Over there (Cohan) B-22125

=== 26 September 1918 ===
Camden

- Pietà, Signore! (att: Stradella) C-22121
- A Granada (Alvarez) C-22124
- Campane a sera (Caruso-Billi) C-22259
- Garibaldi's hymn (Mercantini-Olivieri) B-22260

=== 6 January 1919 ===
Camden

- La campana di San Giusto (Arona) C-22514
- Le régiment de Sambre et Meuse (Cézano-Planquette) C-22516

=== 10 February 1919 ===
Camden

- Sultanto a te (Fucito) B-22515
- Samson et Dalila (Saint-Saëns) Je viens célébrer la victoire with Louise Homer, Marcel Journet C-22575
- L'elisir d'amore (Donizetti) Venti scudi! with Giuseppe De Luca C-22576

=== 8 September 1919 ===
Camden

- 'A vucchella (Tosti) B-23138
- Vieni sul mar! (Anonymous) B-23139
- Tu, ca nun chiagne! (Bovio-De Curtis) B-23141

=== 9 September 1919 ===
Camden

- L'addio a Napoli (Cottrau) B-23140
- Nina (Att. Pergolesi) B-23143
- Premiere Caresse (de Crescenzo) B-23144

=== 11 September 1919 ===
Camden

- Senza nisciuno (De Curtis) B-23149
- Salvator Rosa (Gomes) Mia piccirella C-23150
- Serenata (Caruso-Bracco) C-23151
- Scordame (Fucito) B-23152

=== 29 January 1920 ===
Camden

- Love me or not (Secchi) C-23713
- Xerxes (Handel) Ombra mai fu (Largo) C-23714

=== 14 September 1920 ===
Camden

- Noche feliz (Posadas) B-24460
- La juive (Halévy) Rachel! Quand du Seigneur la grâce tutélaire C-24461
- I' m'arricordo e Napule! (Esposito-Gioé) C-24462

=== 15 September 1920 ===
Camden

- Vaghissima sembianza (Donaudy) B-24463

=== 16 September 1920 ===
Camden

- L'africana (Meyerbeer) Deh ch'io ritorni C-24464
- Amadis (Lully) Bois epais B-24465
- A Dream (Cory-Bartlett) B-24466
- Petite messe solennelle (Rossini) Domine Deus C-24473
- Petite messe solennelle (Rossini) Crucifixus B-24474

=== Select Caruso LP issues ===
- Caruso Sings Light Music (RCA Victor LCT-2)
- Caruso (RCA Victor LCT-1007)
- Caruso in Opera and Song (RCA Victor LCT-1034)
- Caruso In Faust (RCA Victor LCT-1103)
- Caruso Sings Neapolitan Songs (RCA Victor LCT-1129)
- Caruso (3 LPs - RCA Victor LM-6127)
- The Best Of Caruso (2 LPs - RCA Victor LM-6056)
- The Young Caruso (Angel COLH 119)
- Caruso - The Voice Of The Century (RCA Victor LM-2639)
- Caruso Operatic Rarities (RCA Victor LM-2700)
- Caruso In Song (RCA Victor LM-2778)
- Caruso - Immortal Performances 1904-06 (RCA Victrola VIC-1430)
- The Met's First Butterfly (RCA Victrola VIC-1600)
- Golden Age Aida (RCA Victrola VIC-1623)
- The Young Caruso (Seraphim 60146; reissue of Angel COLH 119)
- The Greatest Hits Of Enrico Caruso Volume 1 (RCA Red Seal ARM1-0278)
- The Greatest Hits Of Enrico Caruso Volume 2 (RCA Red Seal ARM1-0279)
- Caruso (4 LPs - RCA Red Seal ARM4-0302)
- Caruso - A Legendary Performer (RCA Red Seal CRM1-1749)

=== Select Caruso CD issues ===
- The Legendary Enrico Caruso - 21 Favorite Arias (RCA Red Seal 5911-2-RC)
- Enrico Caruso - Opera Arias And Songs Milan 1902-1904 (EMI CDH 7 61046 2)
- The Complete Caruso (12 CDs - RCA Victor Gold Seal 60495-2-RG)
- Caruso Sings Verdi (RCA Victor Gold Seal 61242-2)
- Caruso Sings Verisimo Arias (RCA Victor Gold Seal 61243-2)
- Caruso Sings Faust (RCA Victor Gold Seal 61244-2)
- Caruso In Song (RCA Victor Gold Seal 61640-2)
- Caruso In Love (RCA Victor Gold Seal 61639-2)
- Caruso Duets & Ensembles (RCA Victor Gold Seal 61638-2)
- Caruso - The Greatest Tenor In The World (2 CDs - RCA Red Seal 74321 63469 2)

== Bibliography ==
- John Richard Bolig, Caruso Records: A History and Discography, Mainspring Press, 2002 ISBN 0967181933.
- Pekka Gronow, Ilpo Saunio, International History of the Recording Industry, Continuum, 1999 ISBN 030470590X.
