= Frances Starr =

American actress (1881–1973)

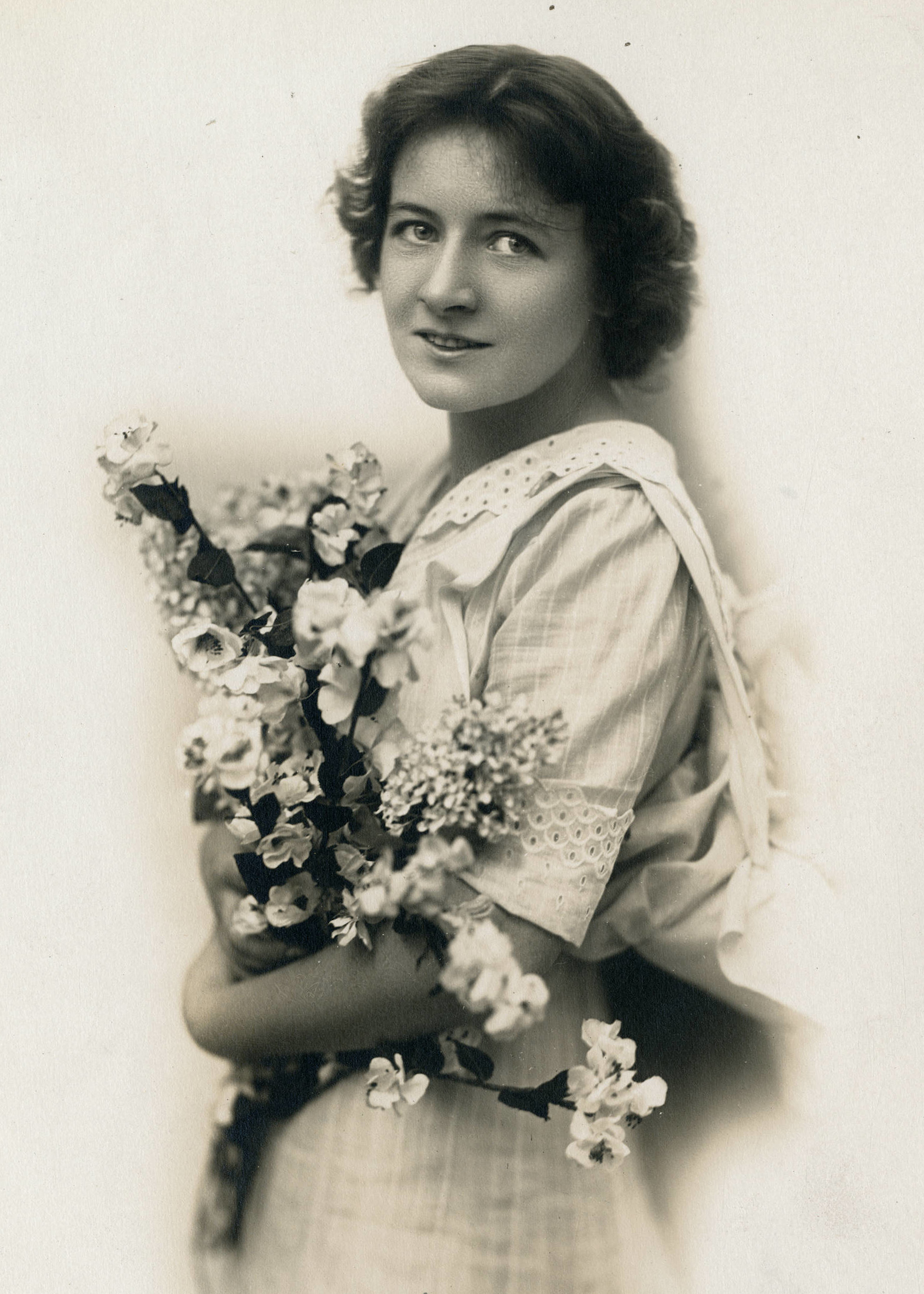
- Born: Frances Grant Starr; June 6, 1881; Oneonta, New York, U.S.
- Died: June 11, 1973 (aged 92); New York City, U.S.
- Resting place: Albany Rural Cemetery
- Occupation: Actress
- Years active: 1901–1955
- Spouses: Haskell Coffin; Robert G. Donaldson; Emil C. Wetten

Frances Grant Starr (June 6, 1881 – June 11, 1973) was an American stage, film and television actress.

== Early years ==
Starr's parents were Charles Edward Starr and Emma (née Grant). She had two half sisters, and her father died when she was a child.

== Career ==
Starr started in plays in 1901 in an Albany stock company, in which Lionel Barrymore and Alison Skipworth were members. She starred opposite Charles Richman as Nell Colfax in David Gray's Gallops at the Garrick Theatre in 1906. Later that year she signed with David Belasco and appeared in a small role with David Warfield in The Music Master.

In November 1906, she appeared along with another young actress, Jane Cowl, in The Rose of the Rancho. She achieved her breakout stage role in 1909 in Belasco's production of The Easiest Way. Starr continued to have a string of successes such as The Case of Becky (1912) and Shore Leave (1922).

She delivered a standout role as the wronged mother in Five Star Final (1931), an early talkie about newspaper corruption. It was her second of only three sound films. Lastly she appeared in This Reckless Age (1932) with Buddy Rogers and Richard Bennett. On television, Starr appeared on Studio One, Omnibus, Kraft Television Theatre and other programs.

Starr's Broadway credits included The Ladies of the Corridor (1953), The Sacred Flame (1952), The Long Days (1951), The Young and Fair (1948), Claudia (1941), The Good (1938), Field of Ermine (1935), Lady Jane (1934), Moor Born (1934), The Lake (1933), Diplomacy (1928), Immoral Isabella? (1927), The Shelf (1926), Shore Leave (1922), The Easiest Way (1921), One (1920), Tiger! Tiger! (1918), Little Lady in Blue (1916), Marie-Odile (1915), The Secret (1914), The Secret (1913), The Case of Becky (1912), The Easiest Way (1909), The Rose of the Rancho (1906), Gallops (1906), and Nell Gwyn (1901).

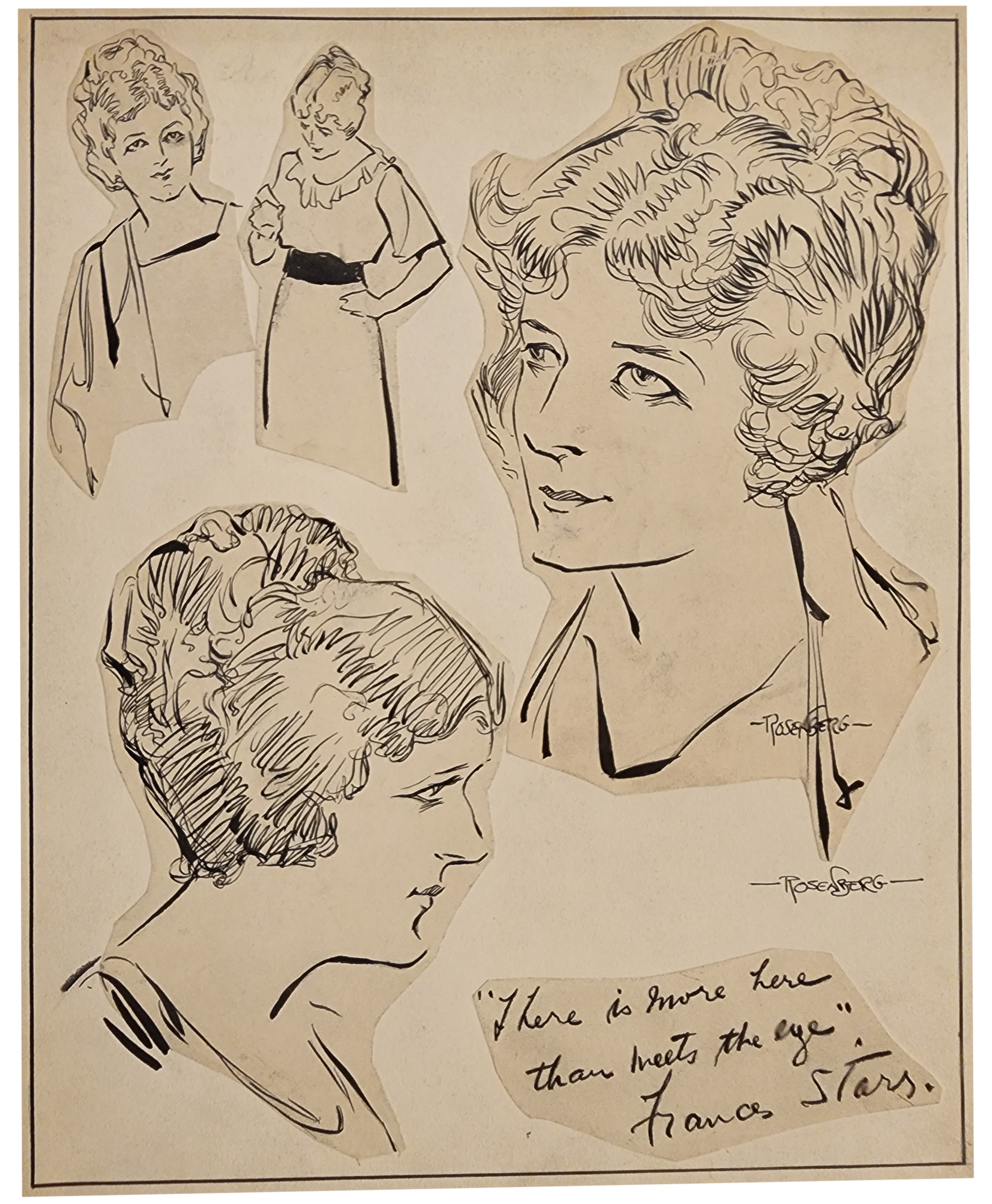
Signed drawing by Manuel Rosenberg 1922

== Personal life ==
Starr's marriages to artist William Haskell Coffin and banker R. Golden Donaldson ended in divorce. She was widowed by her third husband, attorney Emil C. Wetten.

== Death ==
Starr died on June 11, 1973, at her home at age 92.

== Filmography ==
- Tiger Rose (1923) as Minor Role
- The Star Witness (1931) as Ma Leeds
- Five Star Final (1931) as Nancy 'Voorhees' Townsend
- This Reckless Age (1932) as Eunice Ingals
- Ford Theatre Hour (1949, TV Series) as Margaret 'Marmee' March
- Hallmark Hall of Fame (1952, TV Series) as Anna Warner
- Crime Photographer (1952, TV Series)
- Studio One (1952-1953, TV Series) as Mrs. Fairfax
- Omnibus (1953, TV Series) as Mother (segment "The Sojourner")
- Love Story (1954, TV Series)
- Center Stage (1954, TV Series)
- Mr. Citizen (1955, TV Series) as Sophie Farnham
- Kraft Television Theatre (1955, TV Series) as Nora
- The Philco-Goodyear Television Playhouse (1955, TV Series)
