= Original Recordings =

The Original Recordings may refer to:

- Original Recordings (Elkie Brooks album)
- The Original Recordings compilation album by The Detroit Cobras 2008
- FZ Original Recordings; Steve Vai Archives, Vol. 2 Frank Zappa
- Enrico Caruso original recordings discography
