= Anna Case =

American soprano opera singer (1887-1984)

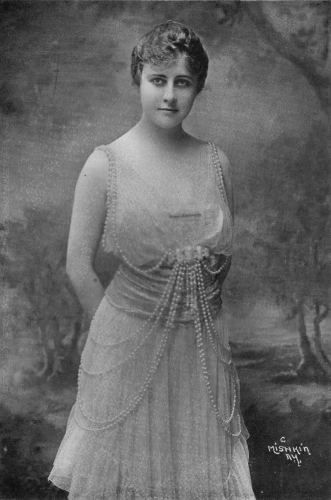

Background information
- Born: October 29, 1887; Clinton, New Jersey, U.S.
- Origin: United States
- Died: January 7, 1984 (aged 96) New York City, New York, U.S.
- Occupation: Opera singer
- Years active: 1909–1931

Anna Case (October 29, 1887 - January 7, 1984) was an American operatic lyric soprano. She recorded with Thomas Alva Edison, who used her voice extensively in "tone tests" of whether a live audience could tell the difference between the actual singer and a recording. In addition to recordings for Edison Records on both phonograph cylinder and Diamond Disc, Case recorded for Victor and Columbia Records, and made sound film for Vitaphone.

== Biography ==
Case was born in Clinton, New Jersey, on October 29, 1887, and educated by vocal trainer Augusta Öhrström-Renard in New York. Case made her debut in 1909 at the New Theatre in New York as the Dutch Boy in Werther, and from 1909 to 1916 was a member of the Metropolitan Opera Company. In her first American performances, she created the roles of Sophie in Der Rosenkavalier (1913) and Feodor in Boris Godunov (1913). She sang Olympia in Tales of Hoffmann, Mimi in La Boheme, and Micaela in Carmen.

Case in a 1926 Vitaphone Varieties short

Case wrote the music and lyrics to several songs during the 1910s and 20s. She made her film debut in the 1919 silent drama film The Hidden Truth, and sang one of her original songs in the 1926 Vitaphone short La Fiesta. She also appeared in documentaries about sound recording. In 1930, she recorded "Just Awearyin' for You" by Frank Lebby Stanton and Carrie Jacobs-Bond.

On July 18, 1931, Case married ITT Corporation executive Clarence H. Mackay at St. Mary's Roman Catholic Church in Roslyn, New York, and retired from the stage shortly afterwards. She began to write songs more prolifically in 1936, penning over 50 in two years, and sang occasionally at social events. Her husband died in November, 1938, and Case died in New York City on January 7, 1984, aged 96.

Upon her death, she bequeathed her 167.97-carat (33.59 g) Colombian emerald ring and Cartier necklace containing more than 2,000 diamonds, 35 emeralds and an oval cabochon-cut Columbian emerald of 167.97 carat to the Smithsonian Institution.

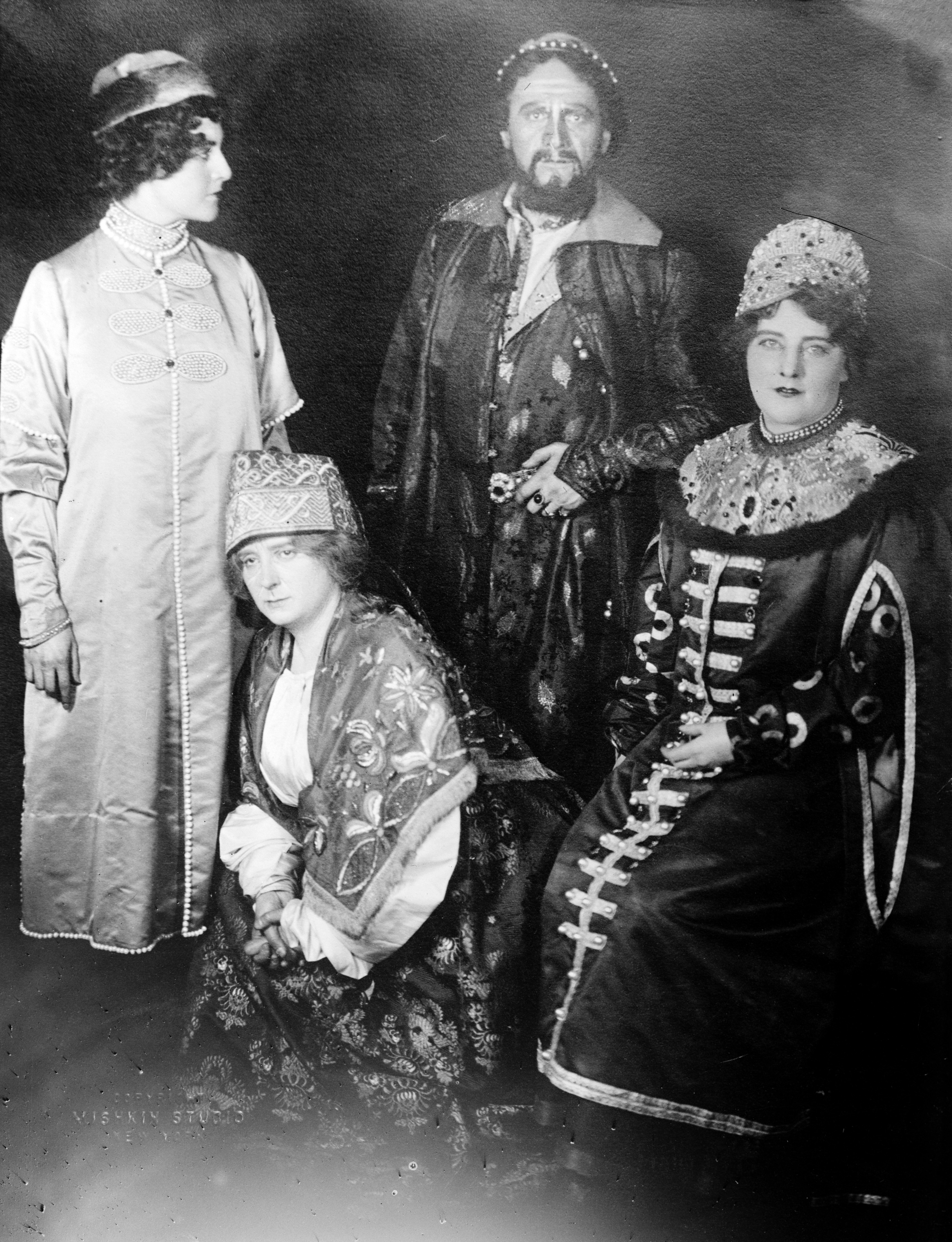
1912 Metropolitan Opera premiere of Boris Godunov with Anna Case, Marie Duchène, Adamo Didur as Boris Godunov, and Leonora Sparkes

1915 Edison recording of "La sonnambula. Ah! Non credia mirarti", performed by Case
