= My Friend the Devil =

1922 film

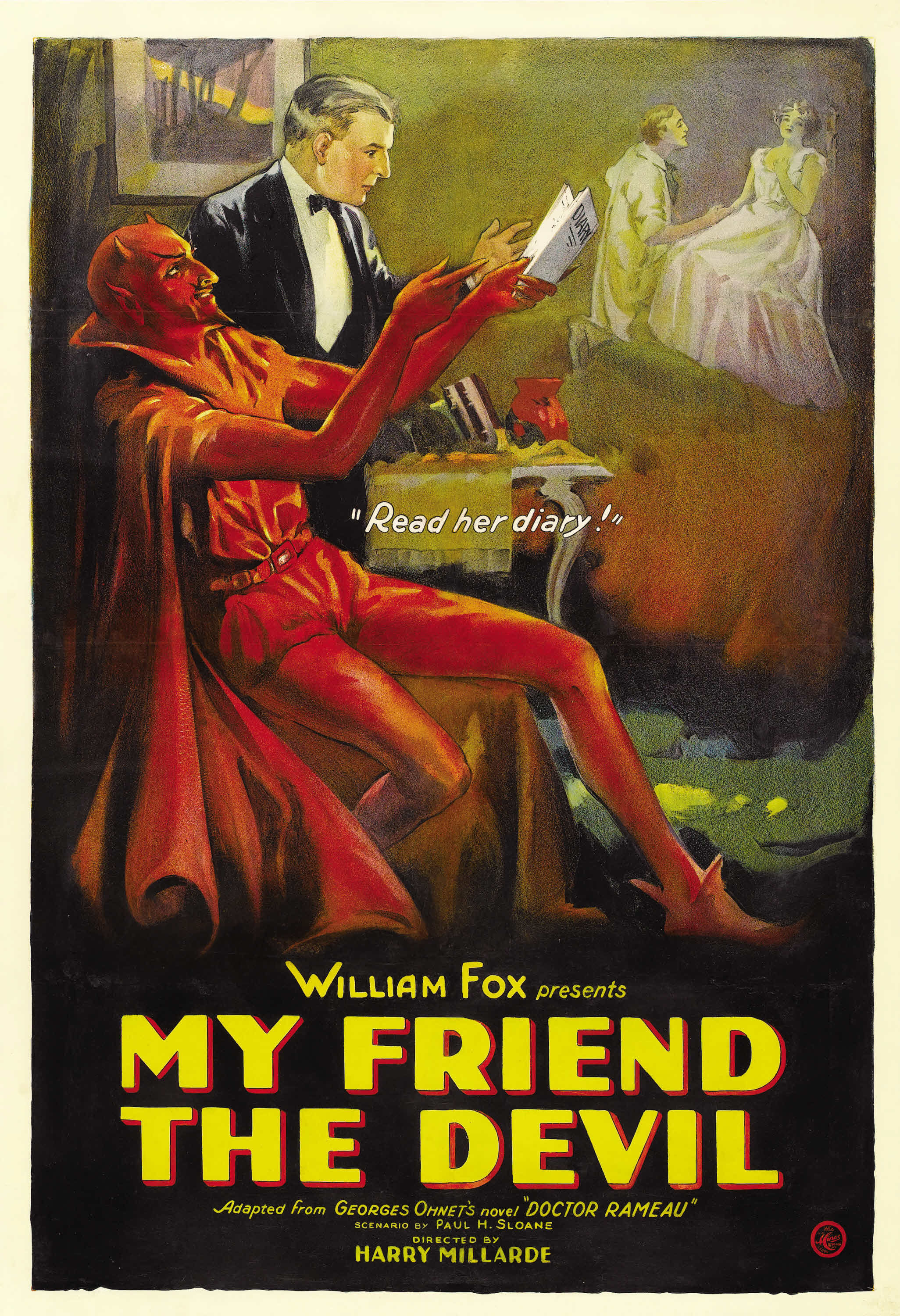
- Theatrical release poster
- Directed by: Harry Millarde
- Written by: Paul Sloane
- Based on: novel Doctor Rameau by Georges Ohnet
- Produced by: William Fox; Harry Millarde
- Starring: Charles Richman
- Cinematography: Joseph Ruttenberg
- Distributed by: Fox Films
- Release date: November 19, 1922
- Running time: 1hr. 20 mins
- Country: USA
- Language: Silent (English intertitles)

My Friend the Devil is a lost 1922 silent film romantic drama directed by Harry Millarde. It starred stage actor Charles Richman and was produced and distributed by Fox Film.

== Cast ==
- Charles Richman as George Dryden
- Ben Grauer as George Dryden, as a boy
- William H. Tooker as Dr. Brewster
- Adolph Milar as Dryden's Stepfather
- John Tavernier as The Old Doctor
- Myrtle Stewart as George Dryden's Mother
- Barbara Castleton as Anna Ryder
- Alice May as Mrs. Ryder
- Peggy Shaw as Beatrice Dryden
- Robert Frazer as The Artist
- Mabel Wright as The Governess

== See also ==
- 1937 Fox vault fire
