= Gallops (play) =

1906 play by David Gray

Gallops is a play in four acts by David Gray. Written as a starring vehicle for the actor Charles Richman, the work's plot was loosely adapted from several short stories written by Gray about fox hunts and horses which were published in the short story collections Gallops (1898) and Gallops II (1903); both by the publisher The Century Company.

== Plot ==
Set on Long Island, the plot begins with Nell Colfax tricking Jack Hemingway into participating in a fox hunt, a sport he knows nothing of, by inviting him to join her on a hike. She dresses him in the fox hunters colors and thrusts the unsuspecting Jack into a large party of Long Island hunters. Everyone mistakes him for his cousin, also named Jack Hemingway, who is a famous jockey that won the Steeplechase. Jack is challenged to a horse race, and is compelled to accept even though he has never ridden a horse in his life.

== Performance history ==
Gallops premiered on Broadway at the Garrick Theatre on February 12, 1906. The work was the first play presented by The Garrick Theatre Stock Company; a company founded by Charles Richman as the resident troupe at the Garrick Theatre.

Review of the play were positive, and for its time period, the play had a respectable run of 81 performances; closing after a two-month long run in April 1906. Richman starred as Jack Hemingway, and Nell Colfax was portrayed by Frances Starr. Richman also directed the production and the play was produced by William H. Reynolds. The set were designed by Ernest Albert and Arthur Corbault. While not a musical, the play did have an orchestra which performed incidental music by composers George M. Cohan and George Braham; with the latter serving as conductor. The work also featured hunting horn calls and traditional classical music works with hunting themes.

== Bibliography ==
- M. L. Biscotti (2017). "Gray, David (1870–1968)". Six Centuries of Foxhunting: An Annotated Bibliography. Rowman & Littlefield Publishers. ISBN 978-1-4422-4190-9.
- Mantle, Burns; Sherwood, Garrison P.; Chapman, John Arthur (1944). "Gallops". The Best Plays of 1899-1909. Dodd, Mead & Co.
