= Everybody's Business (1919 film) =

1919 film

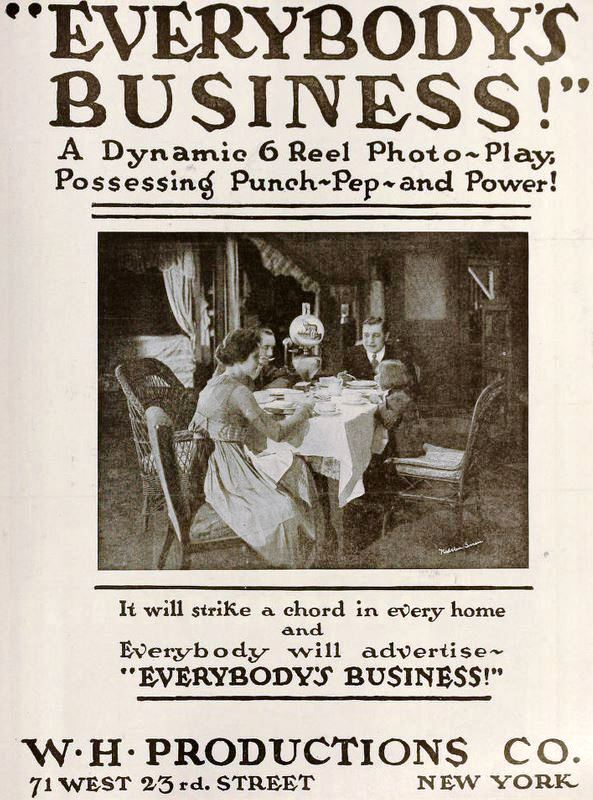
- Directed by: J. Searle Dawley
- Written by: J. Searle Dawley
- Starring: Charles Richman; Alice Calhoun
- Edited by: Elmer J. McGovern
- Production companies: Charles Richman Pictures; W. H. Productions
- Distributed by: Gardiner Syndicate
- Release date: December 19, 1919
- Running time: 70 minutes
- Country: United States
- Languages: Silent; English intertitles

Everybody's Business is a 1919 American silent drama film directed by J. Searle Dawley and starring Charles Richman and Alice Calhoun. It is now considered a lost film and the full cast is unknown. It marked the screen debut of Calhoun.

== Partial cast ==
- Charles Richman as Tom Oakes
- Alice Calhoun as Mildred Arden

== Bibliography ==
- Connelly, Robert B. The Silents: Silent Feature Films, 1910-36, Volume 40, Issue 2. December Press, 1998.
- Munden, Kenneth White. The American Film Institute Catalog of Motion Pictures Produced in the United States, Part 1. University of California Press, 1997.
