= Maria Duchêne =

French contralto

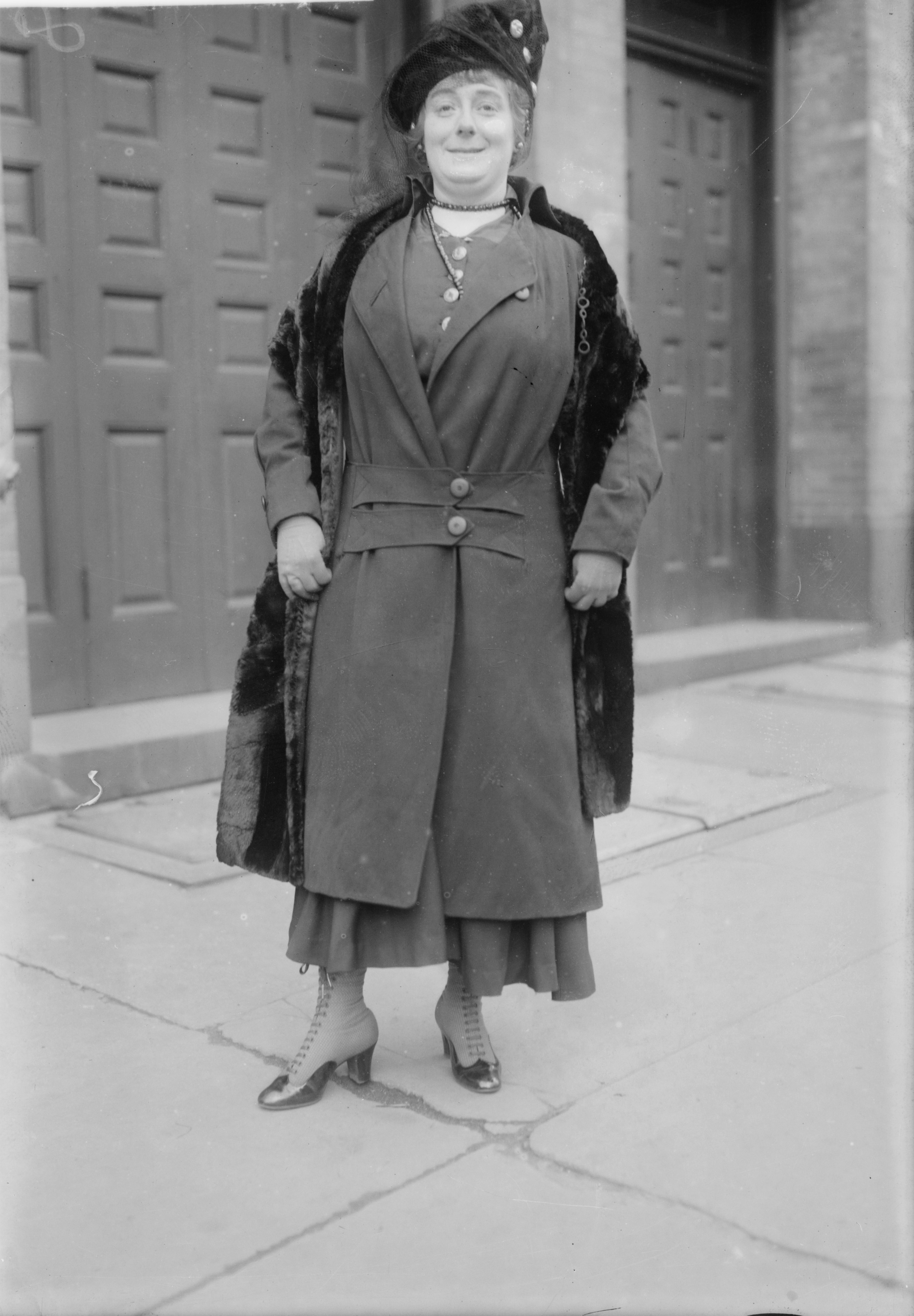
Maria Duchêne in 1916

Maria Duchêne-Billiard (5 December 1883 – 2 April 1947) was a French contralto of the Metropolitan Opera from 1912 to 1916. She portrayed such roles as Amneris in Aida, Giulietta in The Tales of Hoffmann, Lola in Cavalleria rusticana, Maddalena in Rigoletto. She sang the role of the Old Woman in L'amore dei tre re, Rosette in Manon, Schwertleite in Die Walküre, and the Solo Madrigalist in Manon Lescaut among others.

== Biography ==
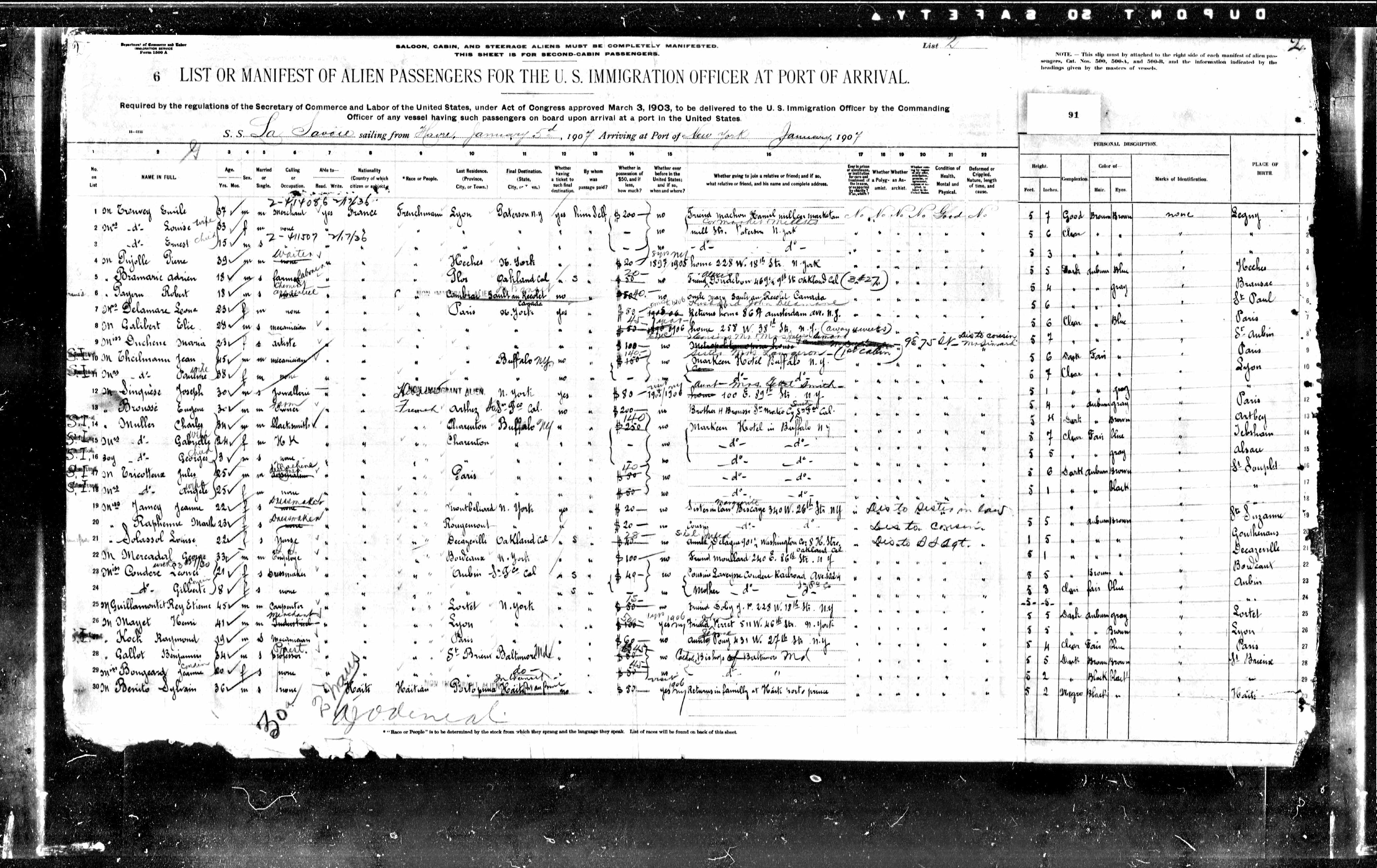
Duchêne arriving in the US in 1907 on the S.S. La Savoie

Duchêne was born in France and arrived in the United States in 1907 at the age of 23, already calling herself an "artiste". In 1910, she created the role of Adah in Naughty Marietta on Broadway.

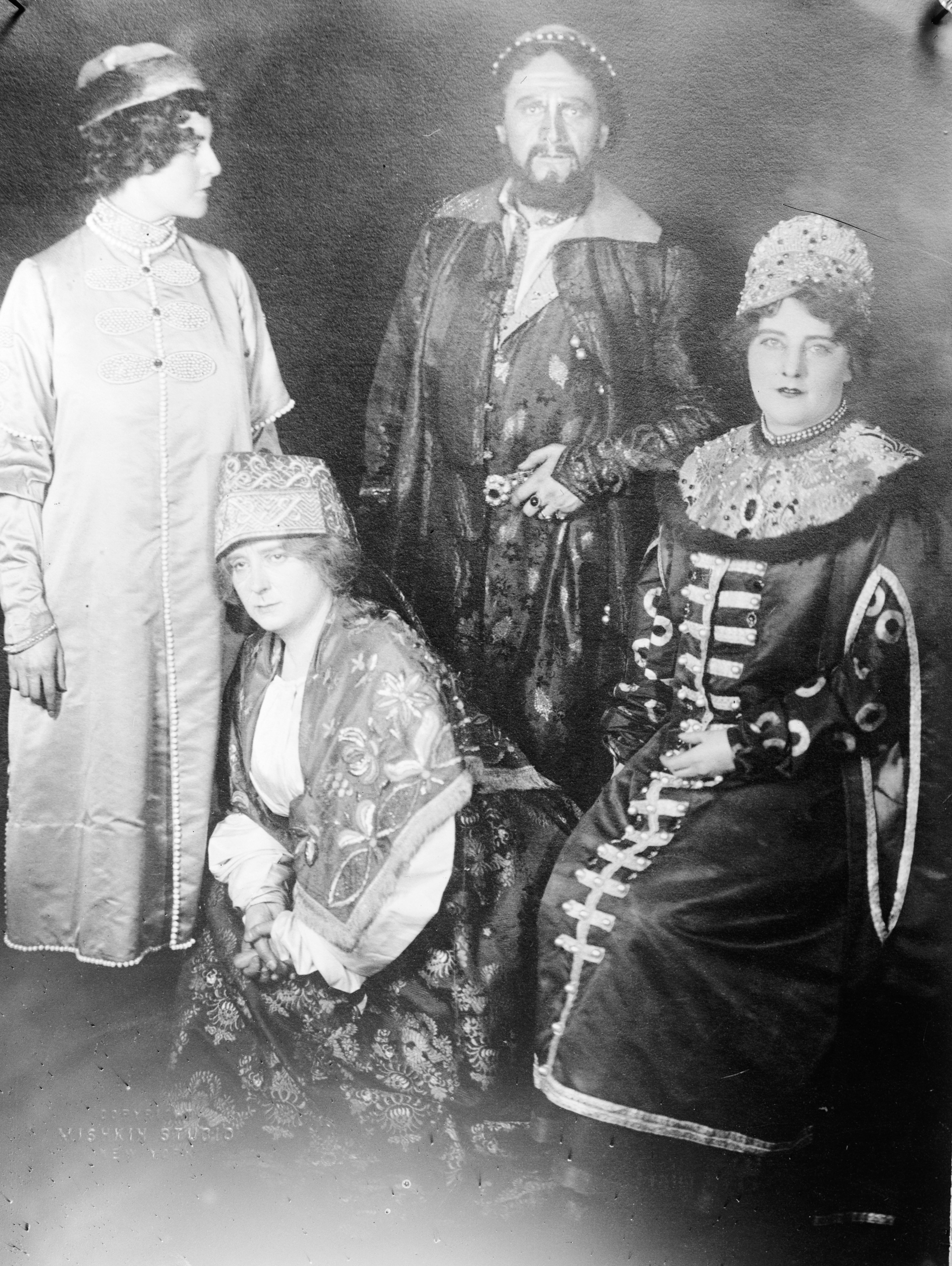
1912 Metropolitan Opera premiere of Boris Gudonov with Anna Case, Marie Duchène, Adamo Didur as Boris Godunov, and Leonora Sparkes

"È scherzo od è follia"
Un ballo in maschera (1859), Act 1, Scene 2. Performed by Enrico Caruso, Frieda Hempel, Marie Duchène, Andrés de Segurola and Léon Rothier

She made her debut at the Metropolitan Opera on 16 March 1912 as La Cieca in Amilcare Ponchielli's La Gioconda with Emmy Destinn in the title role, Enrico Caruso as Enzo, and Arturo Toscanini conducting. She appeared in the American premiere of Boris Godunov as the Nurse in 1912 with Toscanini conducting. On 12 March 1913 she was to sing the role of Giulietta in Les Contes d'Hoffmann when she fainted; her role was taken over by madam Fremsted, who had sung the role when it premiered in the United States.

With the company she notably portrayed the role of the Peasant Woman in the United States premiere of Gustave Charpentier's Julien on 26 February 1914. Her mother, Elizabeth Duchêne (1859–1915) died in 1915 of pneumonia just as Duchêne was about to take the stage as Lola in Cavalleria rusticana.

Her final and 166th performance with the Met was as Ulrica in Un ballo in maschera in an out-of-town performance at the Boston Opera House on 18 April 1916.

On 7 October 1926, she married André Dumont (1896–1942), a French harmonium maker at Les Andelys. On 11 August 1937, they divorced.

She died on 2 April 1947.
