= The Hidden Truth =

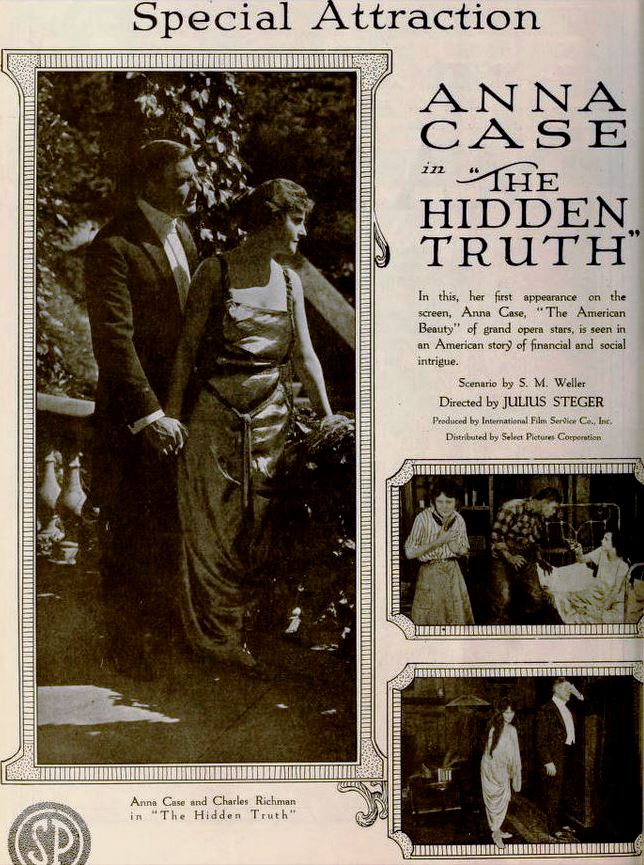
- Advertisement
- Directed by: Julius Steiger
- Written by: S. M. Weller (story, scenario)
- Produced by: International Film Service
- Starring: Anna Case
- Cinematography: William Crolly
- Distributed by: Select Pictures
- Release date: January 20, 1919
- Running time: 5 reels
- Country: United States
- Language: Silent (English intertitles)

The Hidden Truth is a lost 1919 American silent drama film directed by Julius Steiger and starring Anna Case, an opera singer and stage star Charles Richman.

== Cast ==
- Anna Case as Helen Merrill
- Charles Richman as Charles Taylor
- Emma Campbell as Mrs. Collins
- Forrest Robinson as Judge Blake
- Grace Reals as Mrs. Blake
- Thomas J. McGrane as Bill Sheridan (credited as Thomas McGrane)
- John Charles as George Reed
- Frank Wunderlee as Jake Codby (credited as Frank Wonderly)
- Fred Hearn as 'Snipe' Roach (credited as Fred G. Hearn)
- Madelyn Clare as Myrtl Cadby
- William Black as The Sheriff
- Davy Don as The Lumberman (credited as D. L. Don)
