= The Star Witness =

1931 film

- Directed by: William A. Wellman
- Screenplay by: Lucien Hubbard (story and dialogue); Bud Barsky story
- Starring: Walter Huston; Frances Starr; Grant Mitchell
- Cinematography: James Van Trees
- Edited by: Harold McLernon
- Music by: Leo F. Forbstein; Alois Reiser (composer: title music)
- Distributed by: Warner Bros. Pictures
- Release date: August 22, 1931 (U.S.)
- Running time: 68 minutes
- Country: United States
- Language: English

The Star Witness is a 1931 American pre-Code crime drama film produced and distributed by Warner Bros. Pictures and directed by William A. Wellman. The film stars Walter Huston, Frances Starr, Grant Mitchell, and Chic Sale. The Star Witness was nominated for an Academy Award at the 5th Academy Awards for Best Story.

A print of the film is preserved by the Library of Congress.

== Plot ==
The Leeds family consists of two adult children, their two young brothers, their parents, and Grandpa Summerill, a feisty retired soldier visiting from the old soldiers' home. Hearing a commotion outside, most of them go to the windows and witness gangster "Maxey" Campo murdering two men. Campo enters the house, assaults Grandpa for confronting him, threatens the family with harm if they talk, and flees by the back exit.

District Attorney Whitlock wants to make an example of Campo. The Leedses are naive about the danger to themselves and happy to cooperate, and Campo is arrested on the basis of their information. Whitlock's assistant plans to put the witnesses in protective custody in jail once Campo is indicted, but the gang acts faster. Pa Leeds is kidnapped and, after he rejects a bribe for the family to recant their identification of Campo, is badly beaten and dumped beside a road. Pa is well enough to stay at home, and Whitlock confines the whole family to their house for their protection. But they now disagree about whether to go through with their testimony.

On the day of Campo's indictment hearing, the youngest boy, Donny, does not want to miss playing in a baseball game. He slips out of the house, but never gets to the game. The family receives a phone call from the gang, threatening Donny's life if they identify Campo at the hearing. Grandpa still considers it his patriotic duty as an American to tell the truth, but now he is the only one.

Only the exchange where the phone call originated is known. The police conduct a massive house-to-house search for Donny in that area — while Grandpa slips away and begins his own search. Meanwhile, Whitlock has to present the witnesses against Campo. Even when threatened with perjury charges, one by one the family members lie and say they aren't sure or don't remember. And Grandpa, the star witness Whitlock could count on, is nowhere to be found.

Killing time in the apartment where he is being held, Donny starts showing one of his captors a baseball pitch, when he hears Grandpa's fife outside. He throws the baseball through the window and calls out. Grandpa eventually convinces the police of what is happening, and after a gun battle, Donny is rescued. Whitlock is informed and the judge, who was about to dismiss the indictment, delays the hearing until Grandpa arrives.

Delighting in his moment, Grandpa boldly identifies Campo, makes a short speech about Americans' patriotic duty to stand up to "any dang dirty foreigner" criminals, trips Campo off his feet in retaliation for the earlier assault, and then declares he is ready to begin his testimony. A newspaper headline tells us that Campo has been executed. Grandpa returns to the old soldiers' home.

== Cast ==
- Walter Huston ... District Attorney Whitlock
- Frances Starr ... Ma Leeds
- Grant Mitchell ... Pa Leeds
- Sally Blane ... Sue Leeds
- Ralph Ince ... "Maxey" Campo
- Edward J. Nugent ... Jackie Leeds
- Dickie Moore ... Ned Leeds
- Nat Pendleton ... Henchman Big Jack
- George Ernest ... Donny Leeds
- Russell Hopton ... Deputy Thorpe
- Charles "Chic" Sale ... Private "Grandpa" Summerill
