= George A. Garrett =

American investment banker and diplomat (1888-1971)

- Garrett in 1938

United States Envoy to Ireland
- In office July 28, 1947 – April 18, 1950
- President: Harry S. Truman
- Preceded by: David Gray
- Succeeded by: post ended

United States Ambassador to Ireland
- In office April 18, 1950 – May 27, 1951
- President: Harry S. Truman
- Preceded by: post created
- Succeeded by: Francis P. Matthews

Personal details
- Born: August 5, 1888 La Crosse, Wisconsin, U.S.
- Died: September 29, 1971 (aged 83) Washington, D.C., U.S.
- Party: Democratic
- Spouse: Ethel Shields Darlington
- Children: 1
- Education: University of Chicago

Military service
- Allegiance: United States
- Branch/service: United States Army
- Battles/wars: World War I

George Angus Garrett (August 5, 1888 – September 29, 1971) was an American investment banker and diplomat. In April 1947, he was appointed minister to Ireland; in 1950, he became the first United States Ambassador to Ireland, a position he held until May 1951.

== Early life ==
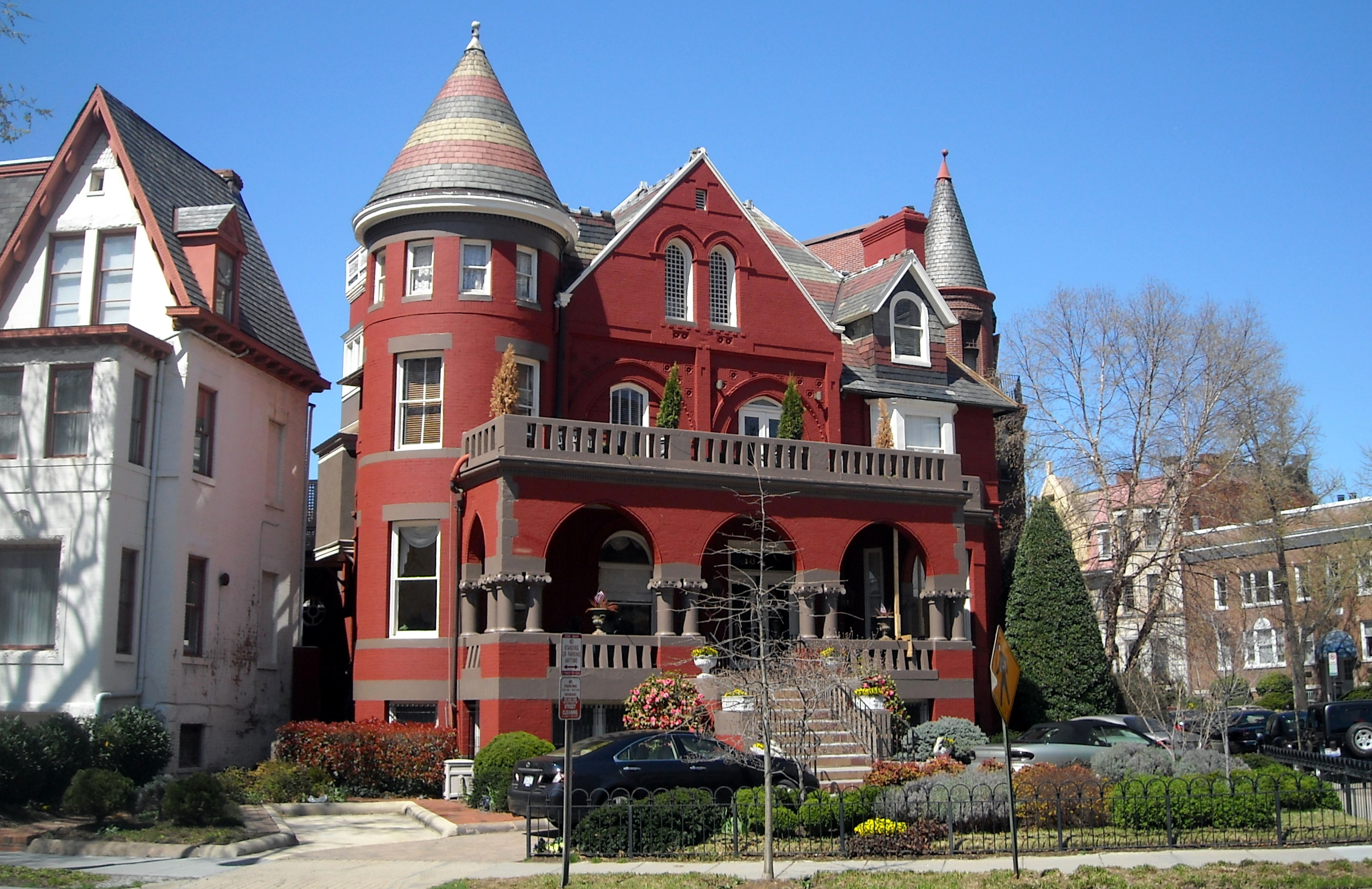
Garrett's former house in the Dupont Circle neighborhood of Washington, D.C.

Garrett was born on August 5, 1888, in La Crosse, Wisconsin.

== Education ==
He first attended Cornell University, before graduating in 1910 from the University of Chicago.

== Career ==
During World War I he served in the United States Army. As a civilian he pursued a career as a stockbroker. In 1932, Garrett was a delegate to the Democratic National Convention.

In April 1947, Garrett was appointed minister to Ireland by President Harry S. Truman, and became the last US chief of mission in Ireland with the formal title of Envoy Extraordinary and Minister Plenipotentiary. In 1950, the post was raised to the level of ambassador, and Garrett was again appointed by Truman, becoming the first US chief of mission in Ireland with the formal title of Ambassador Extraordinary and Plenipotentiary.

Although Garrett's relations with Ireland's Taoiseach (prime minister) Éamon de Valera were not unfriendly, he made no secret of his pleasure when de Valera was replaced in 1948 by John A. Costello, for whom Garrett had the greatest admiration, and whom he thought a more reliable friend to the United States.

== Death ==
Garrett died on September 29, 1971, and was interred at the Washington National Cathedral.

Diplomatic posts
Preceded by David Gray	United States Envoy to Ireland; 1947–1950	Succeeded by post ended
Preceded by post created	United States Ambassador to Ireland; 1950–1951	Succeeded by Francis P. Matthews
