= Frieda Hempel =

German soprano (1885–1955)

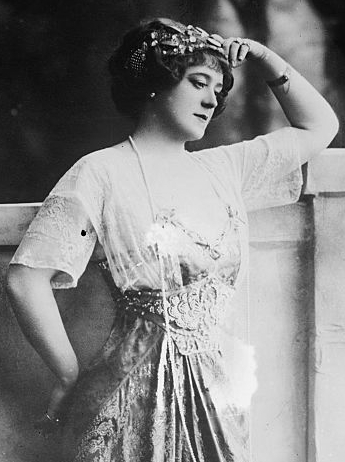
- Frieda Hempel in costume
- Born: 26 June 1885; Leipzig, German Empire
- Died: 7 October 1955 (aged 70); West Berlin, West Germany
- Occupation: lyric coloratura soprano

Frieda Hempel (26 June 1885 – 7 October 1955) was a German lyric coloratura soprano singer in operatic and concert work who had an international career in Europe and the United States.

== Life ==
Hempel was born in Leipzig and studied first at the Leipzig Conservatory and afterwards at the Stern Conservatory, Berlin, where she was a pupil of Selma Nicklass-Kempner. She later studied singing with Sarah Robinson-Duff and Estelle Liebling in New York City; both of whom had been trained by Mathilde Marchesi. Her earliest appearances were in Breslau, singing Violetta, the Queen of the Night and Rosina. She made a debut in Schwerin in 1905, and was engaged there for the next two years, singing also Gilda, Leonora (Il trovatore) and Woglinde.

She made such a success that the Kaiser Wilhelm II requested the Schwerin theater to release her so she could sing also in Berlin. She made a debut there in 1905 as Frau Fluth (in Nicolai's The Merry Wives of Windsor) and also sang at the Bayreuth Festival that year. She sang at the Royal Court Opera, Berlin, from 1907 to 1912, where she was also admired as Lucia, Marguerite de Valois and Marie. The Kaiser's enthusiasm for Hempel led others to call her "the Kaiser's Lark."

=== International career ===
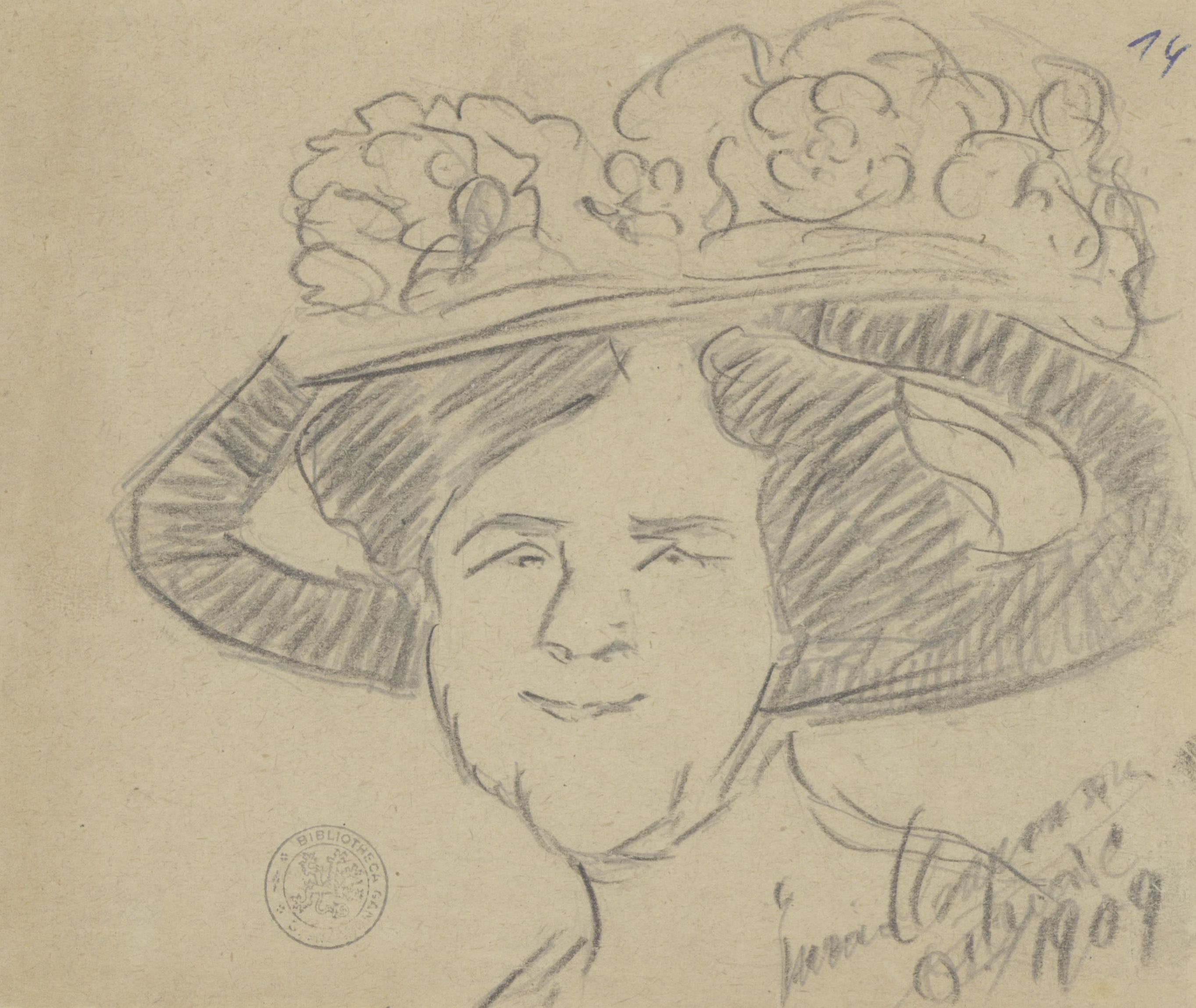
Portrait of Frieda Hempel (1885-1955) from series of caricatures drawn by Enrico Caruso, 1909

È scherzo od è follia
Enrico Caruso, Frieda Hempel, Maria Duchêne, Andrés de Segurola and Léon Rothier performing "È scherzo od è follia" from Giuseppe Verdi's Un ballo in maschera. Recorded 3 April 1914 in New York City.

She appeared at the Covent Garden, London in 1907 as Bastienne, in Humperdinck's Hansel and Gretel, as Eva and Elsa and again as Frau Fluth: Nellie Melba and Selma Kurz were taking centre stage in the more popular roles.

In 1912 she made her debut at the Metropolitan Opera, in New York City as Marguerite de Valois in Les Huguenots. She sang regularly in New York thereafter into the 1950s. She was the first to sing the Marschallin in Der Rosenkavalier in New York (for Giulio Gatti-Casazza, December 9, 1913) and in Berlin, and she also sang the role in London in 1913. She was in the Met 1913 Un ballo in maschera as Oscar, with Caruso, Emmy Destinn, Margaret Matzenauer and Pasquale Amato; also the 1916 staging of The Marriage of Figaro with Matzenauer, Geraldine Farrar and Antonio Scotti. Her La fille du régiment was presented there in 1917. Hempel had a very wide dramatic range, from Rosina or Queen of the Night to Wagner's Eva and Weber's Euryanthe (Metropolitan, 1914 revival).

=== Recitals ===
After 1919 she devoted herself to concert recitals, and left the Metropolitan Opera House somewhat abruptly, making way for the career of Amelita Galli-Curci. However she then made a second career on the concert platform, excelling in "middlebrow" performances which mixed lieder of Mozart, Schubert, Schumann, Brahms, and Wolf, Mozart concert arias, and even popular songs of the day. She became well known for recitals in which she appeared in costume amidst American and Swedish flags as the famous nineteenth-century soprano Jenny Lind; her Swedish role made it possible for Hempel to continue in the limelight despite anti-German sentiment after the wars in Europe (she had sung often for German soldiers during World War I). Her last recital was at New York's Town Hall in 1951.

=== Personal life ===
In 1918, Hempel married the silk merchant and political writer William B. Kahn, taking their honeymoon at the Lake Placid Club. Hempel became an American citizen as a result. They divorced in 1926, but Kahn remained Hempel's business manager. She published her memoirs in German and English, the latter is titled My Life in Singing. Although she was criticized on both sides of the Atlantic for diverse political gaffes in the course of her career, she did not take political sides in a consistent manner.

== Death ==
She died in West Berlin in 1955 at the age of 70.

== Recordings ==
Hempel began making records in Germany for Odeon Records in 1906 and later recorded for the Gramophone Company (His Master's Voice) in England as well as the Victor Talking Machine Company and Edison Records in the US. Most are by the acoustic process. Hempel features on The Record of Singing, vol. 1, in the section "Wagner and the German Style".

== Teaching ==
Her vocal students include the American voice teacher and bel canto scholar Cornelius L. Reid.
