= Andrés de Segurola =

Spanish opera singer (1874–1953)

Andres de Segurola
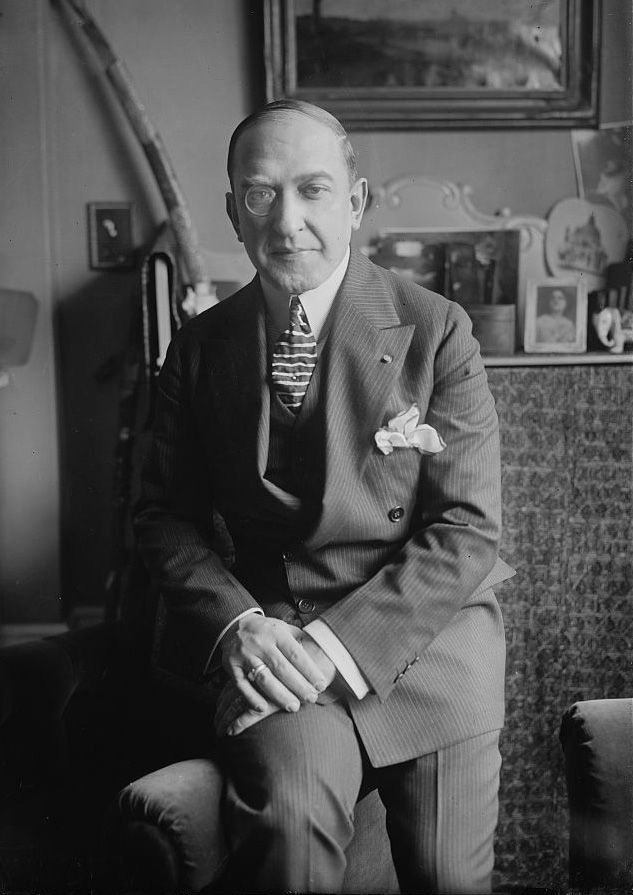

Background information
- Born: 27 March 1874; Valencia, Spain
- Died: 23 January 1953 (aged 78) Barcelona, Spain
- Genre: Opera
- Occupation: Opera singer
- Instrument: Vocals (bass)

"È scherzo od è follia"
Un ballo in maschera (1859), Act 1, Scene 2. Performed by Enrico Caruso, Frieda Hempel, Marie Duchène, Andrés de Segurola and Léon Rothier

Andrés Perelló de Segurola (27 March 1874 – 23 January 1953) was a Spanish operatic bass.

== Biography ==
He was born on 27 March 1874 in Valencia, Spain.

He was a member of the Metropolitan Opera Company between 1901 and 1920 and later appeared in many films. He appeared as himself in the 1928 romantic comedy film The Cardboard Lover.

Towards the end of his career at the Metropolitan Opera, De Segurola also became an impresario. In 1916, he presented a four-week opera season at the Grand National Theatre in Havana, where his company included Geraldine Farrar and Pasquale Amato.

After his retirement from the stage, he taught singing. Amongst his many pupils was Deanna Durbin.

He married Mrs. John Bidlake in 1936.

He died on 23 January 1953 in Barcelona, Spain.

== Roles created ==
- Jake Wallace in La fanciulla del West (Giacomo Puccini), Metropolitan Opera, 10 December 1910
- Didier in Madeleine (Victor Herbert), Metropolitan Opera, 24 January 1914
- Fouché in Madame Sans-Gêne (Umberto Giordano), Metropolitan Opera, 25 January 1915
- Ser Amantio di Nicolao in Gianni Schicchi (Giacomo Puccini), Metropolitan Opera, 14 December 1918

== Partial filmography ==
- The Flaming Omen (1917)
- The Love of Sunya (1927)
- Bringing Up Father (1928)
- Glorious Betsy (1928)
- The Cardboard Lover (1928)
- The Red Dance (1928)
- My Man (1928)
- The Diplomats (1929 short)
- Behind Closed Doors (1929)
- General Crack (1929)
- Mamba (1930)
- La Voluntad del muerto (1930)
- We're Rich Again (1934)
- One Night of Love (1934)
- Public Opinion (1935)
- Castillos en el aire (1938)
