= Charles Richman (actor) =

American actor

Charles J. Richman
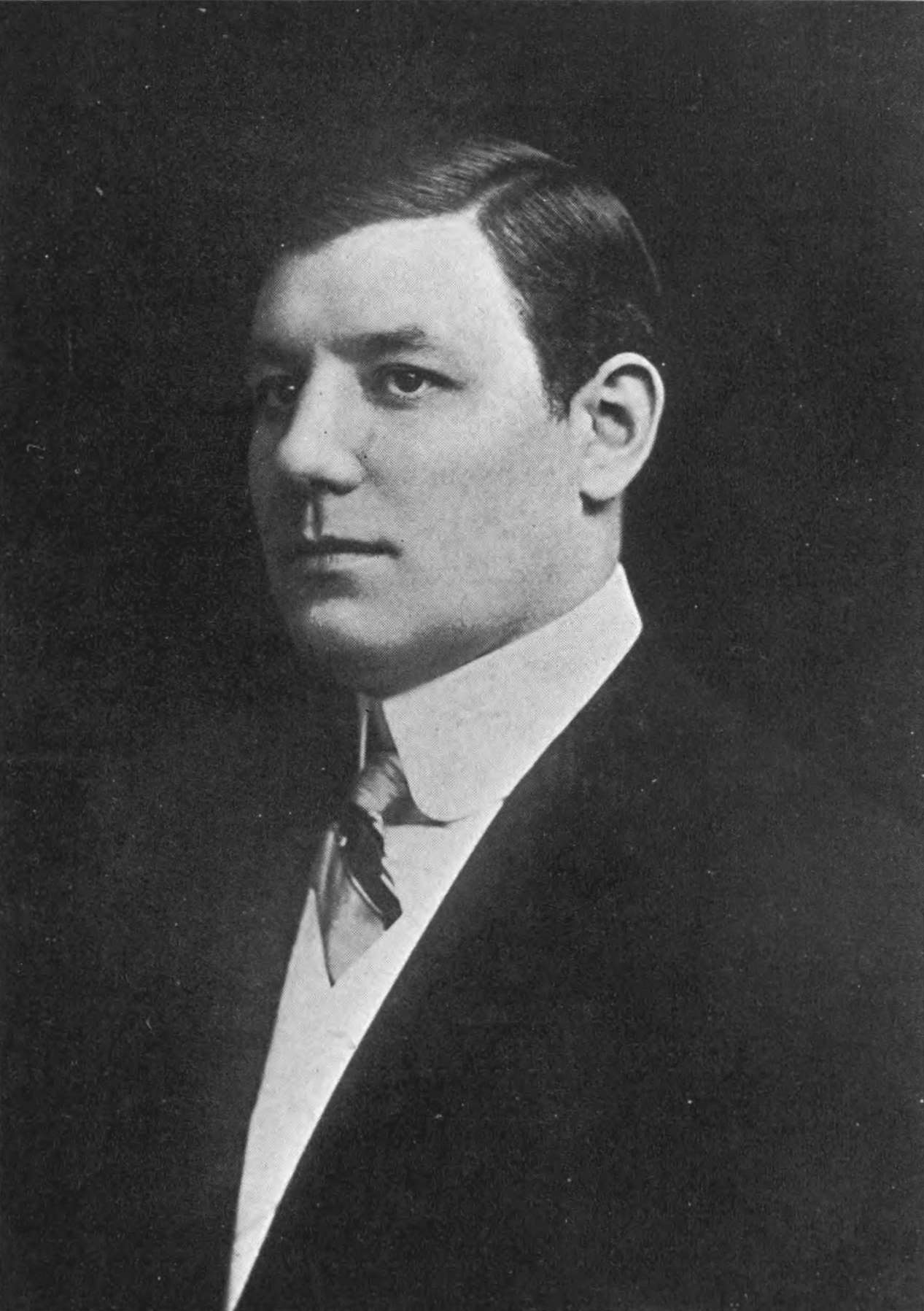
- Born: January 12, 1865; Chicago, Illinois, U.S.
- Died: December 1, 1940 (aged 75); The Bronx, New York, U.S.
- Occupation: Actor
- Years active: 1914–1939
- Spouse: Jane Grey
- Children: 2

Charles J. Richman (January 12, 1865 – December 1, 1940) was an American stage and film actor who appeared in more than 60 films between 1914 and 1939.

Richman was born in the Kenwood Section of Chicago, Illinois. After receiving a public-school education, he attended the Chicago College of Law at night. His interest turned from law to theater after he began acting in amateur productions at the Carleton Club and a millionaire offered to sponsor a touring company headed by Richman. That project led Richman to New York.

Long before entering films Richman acted in the legitimate theatre. His work on Broadway began with portraying Horst von Neuhoff in The Countess Gucki (1896) and ended with playing Grandfather Trenchard in And Stars Remain (1936). In 1906 he founded The Garrick Theatre Stock Company, a troupe in residence at Broadway's Garrick Theatre. Richman served as both star and director for the company's first play, David Gray's Gallops, which premiered on February 12, 1906.

In Hollywood, Richman often played supporting roles as a dignified authoritarian figures like General Tufto in the first Technicolor film Becky Sharp (1935) and Judge Thatcher in The Adventures of Tom Sawyer (1938).

Richman was married to the former Jane Grey for 40 years. They had a son and a daughter.

On December 1, 1940, Richman died in the Brady Nursing Home in The Bronx, New York, aged 70.

== Partial filmography ==
- The Man From Home (1914) as Daniel Voorhees Pike
- The Idler (1914) as Mark Cross
- The Battle Cry of Peace (1915) as John Harrison
- The Heights of Hazard (1915) as Billy Williams
- The Surprises of an Empty Hotel (1916) as Francis Trehurn Marchmont
- The Hero of Submarine D-2 (1916) as Lt. Commander Colton
- The Dawn of Freedom (1916) as Richard Cartwright
- The Secret Kingdom (1916) as Prince Philip / Phil Barr
- The More Excellent Way (1917) as John Warburton
- Public Be Damned (1917) as John Black
- Over There (1917) as Montgomery Jackson
- The Hidden Truth (1919) as Charles Taylor
- The Echo of Youth (1919) as Peter Graham
- Everybody's Business (1919) as Tom Oakes
- Harriet and the Piper (1920) as Richard Carter
- Half an Hour (1920) as Richard Garson
- Curtain (1920) as Dick Cunningham
- Trust Your Wife (1921)
- The Sign on the Door (1921) as 'Lafe' Regan
- My Friend the Devil (1922) as George Dryden
- Has the World Gone Mad! (1923) as Mr. Bell
- The College Hero (1927) as The Dean (uncredited)
- The Struggle (1931) as Mr. Craig
- Take a Chance (1933) as Andrew Raleigh
- His Double Life (1933) as Witt
- The President Vanishes (1934) as Judge Corcoran
- Biography of a Bachelor Girl (1935) as Mr. Orrin Kinnicott
- After Office Hours (1935) as Jordan
- George White's 1935 Scandals (1935) as Charlie Harriman (uncredited)
- The Case of the Curious Bride (1935) as C. Phillip Montaine
- Becky Sharp (1935) as Gen. Tufto
- The Glass Key (1935) as Senator John T. Henry
- Thanks a Million (1935) as Gov. Wildman (uncredited)
- In Old Kentucky (1935) as Pole Shattuck
- Strike Me Pink (1936) as Professor (uncredited)
- My Marriage (1936) as H.J. Barton
- Champagne Charlie (1936) as Avory (uncredited)
- The Ex-Mrs. Bradford (1936) as Mr. Curtis, Turf Club President (uncredited)
- Parole! (1936) as John 'Jack' Driscoll
- I'd Give My Life (1936) as Attorney Bill Chase
- Don't Turn 'Em Loose (1936) as Paul, the Governor (uncredited)
- In His Steps (1936) as Robert Brewster
- Under Your Spell (1936) as Uncle Bob
- Sing Me a Love Song (1936) as Mr. Malcolm (uncredited)
- Stella Dallas (1937) as Stephen Dallas Sr., Suicide Victim (uncredited)
- The Life of Emile Zola (1937) as M. Delagorgue
- Make a Wish (1937) as Wagner
- Fit for a King (1937) as Reception Guest (uncredited)
- Nothing Sacred (1937) as Mayor (uncredited)
- Lady Behave! (1937) as Howell
- Blondes at Work (1938) as Judge Wilson
- The Adventures of Tom Sawyer (1938) as Judge Thatcher
- Holiday (1938) as Thayer (uncredited)
- Personal Secretary (1938) as Judge Barnes (uncredited)
- The Cowboy and the Lady (1938) as Dillon
- Devil's Island (1939) as Governor Beaufort
- The Man Who Dared (1939) as Mayor Lawton (uncredited)
- Dark Victory (1939) as Colonel Mantle
- Torchy Runs for Mayor (1939) as Mayor John Saunders
- Exile Express (1939) as Judge (uncredited)
