= David Gray (diplomat) =

American playwright and novelist (1870–1968)

- Gray, c. 1940

5th United States Minister to Ireland
- In office April 15, 1940 – June 28, 1947
- President: Franklin D. Roosevelt
- Preceded by: John Cudahy
- Succeeded by: George A. Garrett

Personal details
- Born: August 8, 1870 Buffalo, New York, U.S.
- Died: April 11, 1968 (aged 97) Sarasota, Florida, U.S.
- Spouse: Maude Livingston Hall (m. 1914; died 1952)
- Relatives: Eleanor Roosevelt (niece-in-law)
- Education: Harvard University; University at Buffalo Law School

Military service
- Allegiance: United States
- Branch/service: Aviation Section, U.S. Signal Corps; American Expeditionary Forces; Liaison Service
- Battles/wars: World War I

David Gray (August 8, 1870 – April 11, 1968) was an American diplomat, journalist, playwright, novelist, short story writer, and lawyer. A World War I veteran, he served in France in the Aviation Section, U.S. Signal Corps, the American Expeditionary Forces, and as a liaison officer attached to several French armies. He was awarded both the Croix de guerre and the Legion of Honour. During World War II, he served as the United States minister to Ireland from 1940 to 1947. Through his marriage to Maude Livingston Hall, the sister of Anna Hall Roosevelt, he was the uncle of Eleanor Roosevelt.

Gray's first notable work as a writer was as the librettist for Lewis Sabin Thompson's operetta The Sphinx (1892), which the pair created while students at Harvard University. After graduating from Harvard, Gray worked as a journalist and editorial writer for multiple publications in New York State from 1893 through 1899. He then worked as a criminal defense attorney in Erie County, New York from 1899 through 1902. After this three year period, he abandoned the law to pursue a career as a writer full time.

Gray was an author attached to the publisher The Century Company from 1898 through 1918; publishing three books of short story collections and three novels during that period of time. Many of his short stories involved tales of horses and fox hunts; including the collections Gallops I (1898) and Gallops II (1903). He also authored two plays which had successful productions on Broadway: Gallops (1906, adapted from his short stories) and The Best People (1924); the latter of which was co-authored with playwright Avery Hopwood.

== Early life, education, and careers in journalism and the law ==
David Gray, Jr. was born in Buffalo, New York, the son of Martha (née Guthrie) and David Gray, Sr. Both his parents were immigrants to the United States from Scotland. His father was born in Edinburgh in 1836, and came to the United States with his family in 1849. They initially stayed with David Gray Sr.'s Uncle William who was already settled in Buffalo, New York. The family proceeded on to establish a farm two miles outside Waupun, Wisconsin in the autumn of 1849. David Gray, Sr. was not happy with a farmers life, and at the invitation of his uncle William he moved into his uncle's home in Buffalo; taking a job as the secretary of the YMCA in that city in 1856. In 1859 David Gray, Sr. joined the Buffalo Courier as a reporter, and he eventually became editor-in-chief of that publication in 1876. When Mark Twain lived in Buffalo and worked for a rival paper from 1869-1871, David Gray, Sr. and his wife Martha became close friends with Twain and his wife Livy. David Gray, Sr. also was a respected poet, and a collection of his poems and letters was published in 1888; the year of his death in a railway accident.

David Gray, Jr. began his education at the University of Rochester. In 1888, the year of his father's death, he entered Harvard University; graduating from there in 1892 with a Bachelor of Arts. He wrote the libretto for Lewis Sabin Thompson's operetta The Sphinx which was staged by the Hasty Pudding Club at Harvard in 1892. From 1893 through 1899 he worked as both a reporter and editorial writer for several publications in the cities of Rochester and Buffalo, New York; initially working for his father's newspaper the Buffalo Courier. Other papers he worked for included The Union and Advertiser, The Buffalo Times, and The Buffalo Enquirer. In 1897 he became managing editor of the Buffalo Courier, a role that he ultimately was not successful in. After this, he worked as a reporter and editorial writer for the New York World in New York City.

Gray studied the law at the University at Buffalo Law School from 1897-1899; graduating with a L.L.D. He was admitted to the New York State Bar Association in June 1899. He worked as a criminal defense attorney in Erie County, New York from 1899 through 1902; after which he abandoned his law career to pursue a career as a writer of short stories, plays, and novels. From 1909-1911 he resided in New York City, after which he purchased and operated a farm in Geneseo, New York to supplement his income as a writer.

== Career as an author ==
As a writer, David Gray wrote multiple books for the publisher The Century Company from 1898 through 1918. The first of these were two books of short stories about horses, Gallops (1898, later retitled Gallops I ) and Gallops II (1903). These books were later republished in a three volume set entitled The Hitchcock Edition of David Gray: Gallops, Gallops 2 by The Derrydale Press in 1929 with illustrations by the well known horse artist Paul Desmond Brown (1893-1958). He published a third book of short stories, Mr. Carteret and Others, in 1910.

Gray also wrote three novels published by The Century Company. The first of these was Smith (1911); a work Gray adapted from the 1909 play of the same name by W. Somerset Maugham. Like the play, the novel tells the story of man returning to London from Colonial Africa in search of a wife; only to discover he despises the vapid women of his class and much prefers his sister's housemaid, Smith.

Gray's second novel, Ensign Russell (1912), followed the adventures of a junior officer in the United States Navy serving during the time of the Philippine–American War. This work was partially informed by Gray's own life experience. After leaving the law in March 1902, Gray embarked on a voyage around the world via the Panama Canal to the Philippines where he lived for five months. He was part of a civilian group sent by the United States Congress to evaluate the situation in the Philippines and report back on the conditions in the country. Part of this evaluation involved reviewing the work of the United States Navy in order for Congress to determine the need for continued American military presence. He wrote about his personal experiences in this civilian evaluative team in the magazine article "The Recantation of an Anti-Imperialist" for The Outlook, published August 20, 1904. He also wrote a story, "A Filipine Christmas", published in The Century Magazine in December 1904.

Gray's third and final novel was The Boomerang (1918). He was also the author of numerous short stories published in American magazines like Cosmopolitan, The Century Magazine, Metropolitan Magazine and Appleton's Magazine.

For the stage, Gray penned two plays which were produced on Broadway. The first of these plays was also entitled Gallops, and was written as a starring vehicle for the actor Charles Richman. It premiered at the Garrick Theatre on February 12, 1906 and had a respectable run of 81 performances; closing in April 1906. Like many of Gray's horse stories in his Gallops books, the plot of the play centered around a fox hunt and the story of the play was loosely adapted from some of these earlier published stories.

Gray's second stage work was a three act farce originally titled Goodness Knows that had a well received premiere in Cleveland in 1923. However, when the playwright Avery Hopwood attended performances of the work, he felt that act III of the play was not working well and contacted Gray with the offer of assisting him to revise the last act. Together, Hopwood and Gray reworked the final portions of the comedy, and it was this revised version, now entitled The Best People, that premiered at Broadway's Lyceum Theatre on August 19, 1924 with both men credited as the playwrights. A popular and critical success, it ran for a total of 144 performances in its original Broadway run, and was later revived on Broadway at the Waldorf Theatre in 1933. The Best People was adapted into a silent film of the same name in 1925, and later into a sound film, Fast and Loose, in 1930.

== Marriage and military service in World War I ==
Gray was the second husband of Maude Livingston Hall, the sister of Anna Hall Roosevelt and aunt of Eleanor Roosevelt; the latter the wife of the 32nd President of the United States, Franklin D. Roosevelt. Maude was only six years older than Eleanor and they grew up in the same house, making their relationship more like that of sisters than aunt and niece. Her first marriage to the champion polo player Lawrence Waterbury ended in divorce in 1912. When Maude and David married on October 13, 1914 at Poughkeepsie City Hall, Eleanor was one of the two witnesses at their quiet wedding. The couple maintained a close friendship with Eleanor and F.D.R., and resided in Portland, Maine.

Gray was a World War I veteran. In 1917 he was commissioned as a captain in the Aviation Section, U.S. Signal Corps (ASUSC), and left the United States for France on November 2 of that year. Initially a supply officer of the ASUSC's Photographic Division, an organization responsible for gathering aerial photographic intel, he was reassigned to the American Expeditionary Forces (AEF) in December 1917 when land and air photographic reconnaissance was reassigned under that organization. For the AEF he served at their base in Paris as the commanding officer over land photography.

In June 1918 Gray was transferred to the Liaison Service and was assigned to the Fourth French Army under General Gouraud under whom he fought in the Fourth Battle of Champagne. After this he served in the I Corps as a liaison officer to the 7th and 2nd French Armies with whom he fought in the Battle of Château-Thierry. He ended the war as a liaison officer assigned to General Mangin and the 10th French Army. When the 10th Army took the city of Mainz, Gray's horse fell and he broke his leg. He was sent to a hospital in Paris where he remained until he was shipped home to the United States on February 15, 1919.

For his war service, Gray received the Croix de guerre and the Legion of Honour. In 1925, he received a Doctor of Letters from Bowdoin College.

== Minister to Ireland ==
At the age of seventy, Gray was appointed minister to Ireland in February 1940, and presented his credentials in April 1940. His official title was Envoy Extraordinary and Minister Plenipotentiary. In Gray's own words, his appointment was nepotic, as he was the First Lady's uncle.

Gray's interest in Irish politics developed in the two decades prior to his appointment as minister to Ireland. Personal letters and other writing by Gray beginning in 1920 and extending throughout the 1920s and 1930s, indicate that he was a supporter of Irish nationalism and an admirer of Éamon de Valera, later Ireland's Taoiseach (prime minister) during his tenure as minister to Ireland. From June 1933 through June 1934, Gray and his wife lived in a cottage in the village of Castletownshend in County Cork, Ireland; during which time Gray began writing a history of the Irish Free State; ultimately abandoning the project when he realized he knew too much for a "tourist report" but not enough to publish a serious academic work. The couple traveled for extended visits to Ireland three more times between the years 1934 and 1939.

Gray was in his post through most of World War II and the start of the Cold War. He led American efforts to convince Ireland to enter the war on the side of the Allies. Initially a supporter of de Valera, Gray became impatient with his stance of Irish neutrality and under pressure from the Roosevelt administration his behavior became increasingly undiplomatic beginning in November 1940 and continuing. Relationships between Gray and de Valera soured, and de Valera sought repeatedly to have Gray replaced, especially after the death of Franklin D. Roosevelt. Gray believed Ireland was only staying neutral because de Valera actually believed the Nazis would eventually defeat the Allies. He also believed that top Irish officials were colluding with Nazi Germany secretly. When Roosevelt died in April 1945, de Valera ordered flags lowered to half mast as a sign respect and made arrangements for a commemoration service in St Mary's (Catholic) Pro-Cathedral. Gray however sent word that he would not attend unless it was held in St. Patrick's (Church of Ireland) Cathedral, Dublin and refused to correspond on the matter further. Though de Valera initially intended to give his condolences to the U.S. Embassy in person, upon receiving word that Ambassador Gray was "unavailable to receive" them, sent his secretary instead.

=== Views on Ireland ===
As a Roosevelt family member, Gray wrote privately to Franklin and Eleanor Roosevelt with a number of dry verses and remarks, sometimes humorous and sometimes scathing, on his opinions of de Valera and Irish policy towards the War.

Since that time there is no record of his having done what was generous or noble or wise, only what he believed served 'the 'Cause'... he regarded himself as 'The Cause'... What was good for de Valera became good for Ireland. There was no honest view other than his... he dedicated himself to justifying his mistakes and making them stand in history as not being mistakes....

Senior lecturer in U.S. Foreign Policy, Timothy J. Lynch, has observed that "his animus towards his host nation made Gray atypical of American ambassadors in Dublin."

Gray, among other things, relied for guidance on seances conducted at the embassy residence, according to T. Ryle Dwyer, author of a number of publications on Irish neutrality. Throughout the war Gray remained completely at odds with the OSS in Ireland. Gray believed the Irish government was secretly pro-Nazi. Gray consistently tried to get Ireland to join the war against the Nazis, though Ireland refused. De Valera went so far as to ask the United States government and Franklin Roosevelt to remove Gray from his post because of opposition to Irish neutrality, though the U.S. government never did.

=== In popular culture ===
The character of David Gray was played in the 1983 RTÉ television series Caught in a Free State by the actor O. Z. Whitehead.

== Later years ==
After returning to the United States from Ireland, Gray lived with his wife Maude in Portland, Maine up until her death in that city on October 16, 1952 at the age of 75. He later lived in retirement in Sarasota, Florida where he died on April 11, 1968, aged 97. He donated many of his personal papers to the Franklin D. Roosevelt Presidential Library before his death, including an extensive correspondence.

== List of works ==
=== Novels ===
- Smith (1911); adapted from a play by W. Somerset Maugham.
- Ensign Russell (1912)
- The Boomerang (1918)

=== Short stories ===
- Gallops (1898, later retitled Gallops I ), book of multiple short stories
- Gallops II (1903), book of multiple short stories
- Mr. Carteret and Others (1910), book of multiple short stories

=== Stage works ===
- The Sphinx; or, Love at Random (1892, operetta; David Gray, librettist; Lewis Sabin Thompson, composer)
- Gallops (1906, play)
- Goodness Knows (1923, play)
- The Best People (1924, play; revised version of Goodness Knows with playwright Avery Hopwood)

== Bibliography ==
- Mantle, Burns; Sherwood, Garrison P.; Chapman, John Arthur (1944). The Best Plays of 1899-1909. Dodd, Mead & Co.
- McAllister Linn, Brian (2000). Guardians of Empire: The U.S. Army and the Pacific, 1902-1940. University of North Carolina Press. ISBN 9780807863015.
- Raymond, Raymond James (Winter 1985). "David Gray, the Aiken Mission, and Irish Neutrality, 1940–41". Diplomatic History. 9 (1): 55–71. JSTOR 24911654.

Diplomatic posts
Preceded by John Cudahy	United States Minister to Ireland; 1940–1947	Succeeded by George A. Garrett
