= Leonora Sparkes =

British-American mezzo-soprano

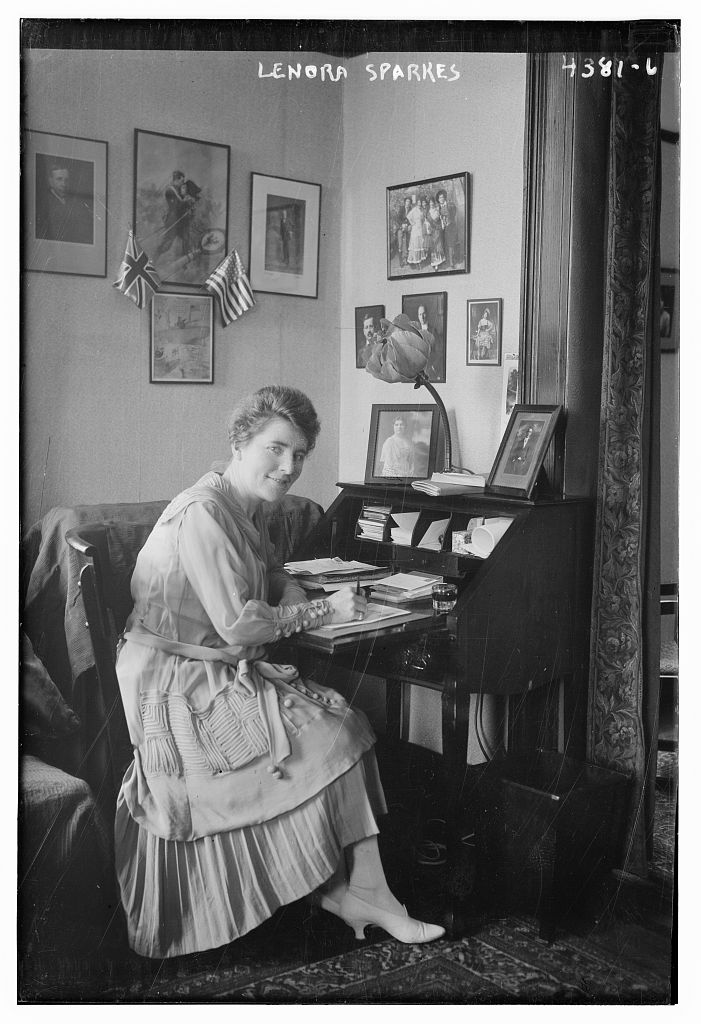
Sparkes in 1917

Lenora Beatrice Sparkes (1878 – June 8, 1969) was a British-American mezzo-soprano who performed at the Metropolitan Opera in New York City in the 1910s.

== Biography ==
She was born in 1878 in Gloucestershire, England to Jacob Sparkes and Elizabeth Mountain. Andreas Dippel heard her sing at Covent Garden and offered her a contract at the Metropolitan Opera in 1908.

She appeared in the American premiere of Boris Godunov at the Metropolitan Opera as Tsarevna Xenia Borisovna of Russia on March 19, 1913 with Arturo Toscanini conducting.

She sang with Enrico Caruso three times, including in the Met's production of Aida in 1913. Her career was primarily spent in London and New York, but she also sang in Paris.

She died in Erie, Pennsylvania aged 90.
