= Sea shanty =

Rhythmic work song sung on sailing vessels

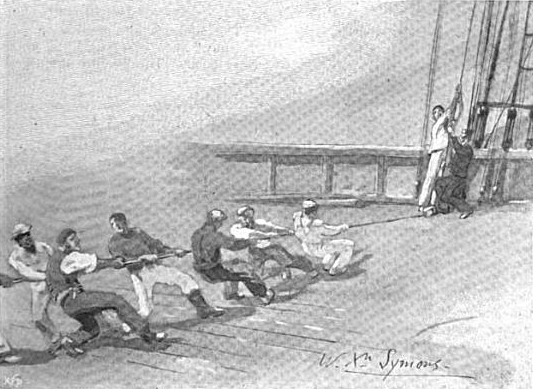
- Sailors performing shipboard labor
- Stylistic origins: Work song, traditional folk
- Derivative forms: Pirate metal, viking metal

A sea shanty, shanty, chantey, or chanty (British English: /ˈʃæntiː/, American English: /ˈʃɛəntiː/) is a genre of traditional folk song that was once commonly sung as a work song to accompany rhythmical labor aboard large merchant sailing vessels. The term shanty most accurately refers to a specific style of work song belonging to this historical repertoire. However, in recent, popular usage, the scope of its definition is sometimes expanded to admit a wider range of repertoire and characteristics, or to refer to a "maritime work song" in general.

Likely from Latin cantare via French chanter, the word shanty emerged in the mid-19th century in reference to an appreciably distinct genre of work song, developed especially on merchant vessels, that had come to prominence in the decades prior to the American Civil War. Shanty songs functioned to synchronize and thereby optimize labor, in what had then become larger vessels having smaller crews and operating on stricter schedules. The practice of singing shanties eventually became ubiquitous internationally and throughout the era of wind-driven packet and clipper ships.

Shanties had antecedents in the working chants of British and other national maritime traditions, such as those sung while manually loading vessels with cotton in ports of the southern United States. Shanty repertoire borrowed from the contemporary popular music enjoyed by sailors, including minstrel music, popular marches, and land-based folk songs, which were then adapted to suit musical forms matching the various labor tasks required to operate a sailing ship. Such tasks, which usually required a coordinated group effort in either a pulling or pushing action, included weighing anchor and setting sail.

The shanty genre was typified by flexible lyrical forms, which in practice provided for much improvisation and the ability to lengthen or shorten a song to match the circumstances. Its hallmark was call and response, performed between a soloist and the rest of the workers in chorus. The leader, called the shantyman, was appreciated for his piquant language, lyrical wit, and strong voice. Shanties were sung without instrumental accompaniment and, historically speaking, they were only sung in work-based rather than entertainment-oriented contexts. Although most prominent in English, shanties have been created in or translated into other European languages.

The switch to steam-powered ships and the use of machines for shipboard tasks by the end of the 19th century meant that shanties gradually ceased to serve a practical function. Their use as work songs became negligible in the first half of the 20th century. Information about shanties was preserved by veteran sailors and folklorist song-collectors, and their written and audio-recorded work provided resources that would later support a revival in singing shanties as a land-based leisure activity. Commercial musical recordings, popular literature, and other media, especially since the 1920s, have inspired interest in shanties among non-sailors. Contemporary performances of these songs range from the "traditional" style of maritime music to various modern music genres.

== Word ==
=== Etymology ===
While the origin of the word "shanty" is uncertain, several inconclusive theories have been put forward. One of the earliest, most consistently offered and widely believed derivations is from the French chanter, "to sing".

The phenomenon of using songs or chants, in some form, to accompany sea labor preceded the emergence of the term "shanty" in the historical record of the mid-19th century. One of the earliest published uses of this term for such a song came in G. E. Clark's Seven Years of a Sailor's Life, 1867. Narrating a voyage in a clipper ship from Bombay to New York City in the early 1860s, Clark wrote, "The anchor came to the bow with the chanty of 'Oh, Riley, Oh,' and 'Carry me Long,' and the tug walked us toward the wharf at Brooklyn." While telling of another voyage out of Provincetown, Mass. in 1865, he wrote:

Every man sprang to duty. The cheerful chanty was roared out, and heard above the howl of the gale. The cable held very hard, and when it surged over, the windlass sent the men flying about the deck, as if a galvanic battery had been applied to their hands. The vessel's head was often buried in the solid seas, and the men, soaked and sweating, yelled out hoarsely, "Paddy on the Railway", and "We're Homeward Bound", while they tugged at the brakes, and wound the long, hard cable in, inch by inch.

Additionally, Clark referred to a lead singer as a "chanty man", and he referred to stevedores unloading cargo from the vessels as "chanty men" and a "chanty gang".

This reference to singing stevedores as "chanty men" connects the genre to a still earlier reference to chanty-man as the foreman of a work gang and the lead singer of their songs. Around the late 1840s, Charles Nordhoff observed work gangs engaged in a type of labor called "cotton-screwing" in Mobile Bay. Characterized by Nordhoff as one of the heaviest sorts of labor, cotton-screwing involved the use of large jack-screws to compress and force cotton bales into the holds of outbound ships. Work gangs consisted of four men, who timed their exertions in turning the jack-screw to songs called chants.

Singing, or chanting as it is called, is an invariable accompaniment to working in cotton, and many of the screw-gangs have an endless collection of songs, rough and uncouth, both in words and melody, but answering well the purposes of making all pull together, and enlivening the heavy toil. The foreman is the chanty-man, who sings the song, the gang only joining in the chorus, which comes in at the end of every line, and at the end of which again comes the pull at the screw handles ...
The chants, as may be supposed, have more of rhyme than reason in them. The tunes are generally plaintive and monotonous, as are most of the capstan tunes of sailors, but resounding over the still waters of the Bay, they had a fine effect.

According to research published in the journal American Speech, Schreffler argues that chanty may have been a back formation from chanty-man, which, further, initially carried the connotation of a singing stevedore (as in Nordhoff's account, above). The historical record shows shanty (and its variant spellings) gaining currency only in the late nineteenth century; The same repertoire was earlier referred to as "song", "chant", or "chaunt".

=== Spelling ===
The spelling of the term appeared quite inconsistently until after the 1920s. While the above noted, American sources used a "ch" spelling, the next published appearances of the term, coming in two very similar articles from British publications from 1868 and 1869, used "shanty". Early writers who gave substantial due to the genre (i.e. those who were not mentioning shanties only in passing) often used the "ch" spelling, regardless of their nationality.

Addressing the Royal Musical Association in 1915, English musicologist Richard Runciman Terry put forward his belief that the genre should be spelled with "sh" on the grounds that the spelling should correspond obviously to pronunciation. In his subsequent shanty collections he used this spelling consistently. American shanty-collector Joanna Colcord made great use of Terry's first book (corresponding with the author, and reprinting some of his material), and she, too, deemed it sensible to adopt the "sh" spelling for her 1924 collection.

Terry's works were the source for those among the earliest of commercial recordings (see below) and popular performances of shanties—especially because, unlike many earlier works, they provided scores with piano accompaniment and sufficiently long, performance-ready sets of lyrics. Colcord's work was also very handy in this regard and was used as a source by prominent British folk revival performers like A. L. Lloyd and Ewan MacColl. Terry and Colcord's works were followed by numerous shanty collections and scores that also chose to use the "Sh" spelling, whereas others remained insistent that "ch" be retained to preserve what they believed to be the etymological origins of the term. By the late 20th century, the "Sh" spelling had become the more or less standard one in Commonwealth English, whereas "ch" spellings remained in common use mostly in the United States.

During the 1920s, the phrase came into regular use by lay commentators, though it was not documented in use by sailors themselves, nor has it been used by knowledgeable authors on the subject such as Stan Hugill. The term "sea shanty/chantey" has become a staple of popular usage, where it helps to disambiguate the work song genre from other meanings of the word "shanty". For example, the "ice fishing shanty", despite its reference to marine activity, is not related.

== History and development ==
=== Emergence ===
Singing or chanting has been done to accompany labor on seagoing vessels among various cultural groups at various times and in various places. A reference to what seems to be a sailor's hauling chant in The Complaynt of Scotland (1549) is a popularly cited example. Liberal use of the word "shanty" by folklorists of the 20th century expanded the term's conceptual scope to include "sea-related work songs" in general. However, the shanty genre is distinct among various global work song phenomena. Its formal characteristics, specific manner of use, and repertoire cohere to form a picture of a work song genre that emerged in the Atlantic merchant trade of the early 19th century. As original work songs, shanties flourished during a period of about fifty years.

==== Work chants and "sing-outs" ====
There is a notable lack of historical references to anything like shanties, as they would come to be known, in the entirety of the 18th century. In the second half of the 18th century, English and French sailors were using simple chants to coordinate a few shipboard tasks that required unanimous effort. A dictionary of maritime terms, in describing the anchor-hauling mechanical device known as a windlass, noted the use of such a chant. This particular old-fashioned style of windlass was one that required workers to continually remove and re-insert "handspikes" (wooden leverage bars) into the device to turn its gears.

It requires, however, some dexterity and address to manage the handspec to the greatest advantage; and to perform this the sailors must all rise at once upon the windlass, and, fixing their bars therein, give a sudden jerk at the same instant, in which movement they are regulated by a sort of song or howl pronounced by one of their number.

Rather than the well-developed songs that characterize shanties, this "howl" and others were evidently structured as simple chants in the manner of "1, 2, 3!" The same dictionary noted that French sailors said just that, and gave some indication what an English windlass chant may have been like:

UN, deux, troi, an exclamation, or song, used by seamen when hauling the bowlines, the greatest effort being made at the last word. English sailors, in the same manner, call out on this occasion,—haul-in—haul-two—haul-belay!

Such simple or brief chants survived into the 19th century. First-hand observers such as Frederick Pease Harlow, a sailor of the 1870s, attested to their ubiquity, saying that they were brought into use whenever a brief task required one. In historical hindsight these items have come to be generically called "sing-outs"; yet even before the known advent of the term shanty, Richard Henry Dana referred to "singing out".

The wind was whistling through the rigging, loose ropes flying about; loud and, to me, unintelligible orders constantly given and rapidly executed, and the sailors "singing out" at the ropes in their hoarse and peculiar strains.

Later writers distinguished such chants and "sing-outs" from shanties proper, but in the case of relatively "simple" shanties—such as those for hauling sheets and tacks (see below)—there is a grey area. This has led some to believe that the more sophisticated shanties of later years developed from the more primitive chants.

==== Early British and Anglo-American sailor work songs ====
A step up in sophistication from the sing-outs was represented by the first widely established sailors' work song of the 19th century, "Cheer'ly Man". Although other work-chants were evidently too variable, non-descript, or incidental to receive titles, "Cheer'ly Man" appears referred to by name several times in the early part of the century, and it lived on alongside later-styled shanties to be remembered even by sailors recorded by James Madison Carpenter in the 1920s. "Cheer'ly Man" makes notable appearances in the work of both Dana (sea experience 1834–36) and Herman Melville (sea experience 1841–42).

When we came to mast-head the top-sail yards, with all hands at the halyards, we struck up "Cheerily, men," with a chorus which might have been heard half way to Staten Land.

The decks were all life and commotion; the sailors on the forecastle singing, "Ho, cheerly men!" as they catted the anchor;

Although "Cheer'ly Man" could be considered more "developed" than the average sing-out, in its form it is yet different from the majority of shanties that are known to us today, suggesting that it belonged to an earlier stage of sailors' songs that preceded the emergence of "modern" shanties.

Detailed reference to shipboard practices that correspond to shanty-singing was extremely rare before the 1830s. In the first place, singing while working was generally limited to merchant ships, not war ships. The Royal Navy banned singing during work—it was thought the noise would make it harder for the crew to hear commands—though capstan work was accompanied by the bosun's pipe, or else by fife and drum or fiddle. A writer from the 1830s made this clear:

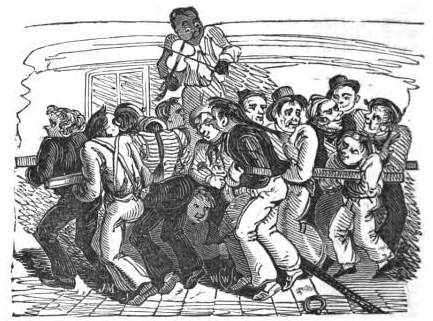
A black fiddler accompanying heaving at the capstan, from The Quid (1832)

On board a well-disciplined man-of-war, no person except the officers is allowed to speak during the performance of the various evolutions. When a great many men are employed together, a fifer or a fiddler usually plays some of their favourite tunes; and it is quite delightful to see the glee with which Jack will "stamp and go", keeping exact time to "Jack's the lad", or the "College Hornpipe".

Fife and fiddle were also used, in earlier times, for work aboard merchant vessels.

One of the earliest references to shanty-like songs that has been discovered was made by an anonymous "steerage passenger" in a log of a voyage of an East India Company ship, entitled The Quid (1832). Crew and passengers alike were noted to join in at heaving the capstan around. They were said to sing "old ditties", along with which a few verses to one or more songs is given. While this practice was analogous to the practice of what is later called singing "capstan shanties", the form of these verses is not particularly similar to later shanties. These songs do not appear to correspond to any shanty known from later eras. It is possible that the long, monotonous task of heaving the capstan had long inspired the singing of time-passing songs of various sorts, such as those in The Quid. For example, the composition of capstan-style "sailor songs" by Norwegian poet Henrik Wergeland as early as 1838 implies that Scandinavians also used such songs. However, these older songs can be distinguished from the later type of songs that were given the label shanty, suggesting there were other formative influences that gave birth to an appreciably new and distinctly recognized phenomenon.

==== Influence of African-American and Caribbean work songs ====
Use of the term "shanty", once this paradigm for singing had become a comprehensive practice for most tasks, incorporated all manner of shipboard work songs under its definition, regardless of style and origin. Yet, shanties were of several types, and not all had necessarily developed at the same time. "Capstan shanties", some of which may have developed out of the earlier capstan songs discussed above, are quite variable in their form and origins. On the other hand, the repertoire of the so-called "halyard shanties" coheres into a consistent form. The distinctive "double-pull" format that typifies most of these songs—also at times used, with slight changes, for pumps, windlass, and capstan, too—was a later development that appears to owe much to African-American work songs.

In the first few decades of the 19th century, European-American culture, especially the Anglophone—the sailors' "Cheer'ly Man" and some capstan songs notwithstanding—was not known for its work songs. By contrast, African workers, both in Africa and in the New World, were widely noted to sing while working. According to Gibb Schreffler, an associate professor of music at Pomona College, European observers found African work-singers remarkable (as Schreffler infers from tone of their descriptions). Schreffler further infers that work songs may have had far less currency among European culture, based on the scant evidence of work-singing aboard European ships in the century prior. Such references begin to appear in the late 18th century, whence one can see the cliché develop that Black Africans "could not" work without singing. For example, an observer in Martinique in 1806 wrote, "The negroes have a different air and words for every kind of labour; sometimes they sing, and their motions, even while cultivating the ground, keep time to the music." So while the depth of the African-American work song traditions is now recognized, in the early 19th century they stood in stark contrast to the paucity of such traditions among European-Americans. Thus while European sailors had learned to put short chants to use for certain kinds of labor, the paradigm of a comprehensive system of developed work songs for most tasks may have been contributed by the direct involvement of or through the imitation of African-Americans. The work contexts in which African-Americans sang songs comparable to shanties included:

- Boat-rowing on rivers of the south-eastern U.S. and Caribbean;
- Corn-shucking parties on plantations of the south-eastern U.S.;
- The work of stokers or "firemen", who cast wood into the furnaces of steamboats plying great American rivers;
- Stevedoring on the U.S. eastern seaboard, the Gulf Coast, and the Caribbean—including "cotton-screwing" (using a large jackscrew to compress and force cotton bales into the holds of outbound ships at ports of the American South).

During the first half of the 19th century, some of the songs African-Americans sang also began to appear in use for shipboard tasks, i.e. as shanties.

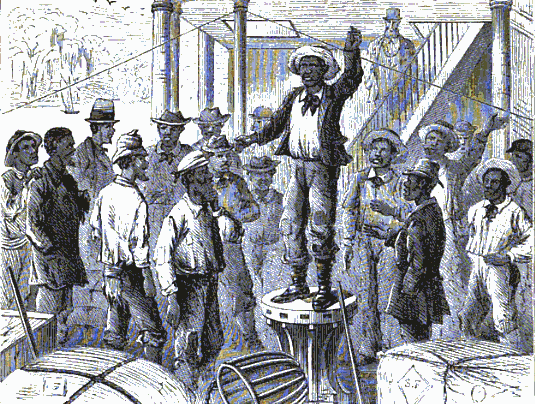
Leader of Mississippi steamboat hands singing a song from atop a capstan

An example of a work song that was shared between several contexts, including, eventually, sailors working, is "Grog Time o' Day". This song, the tune of which is now lost, was sung by: Jamaican stevedores at a capstan in 1811; Afro-Caribbeans rowing a boat in Antigua ca.1814; Black stevedores loading a steamboat in New Orleans in 1841; and a European-American crew hauling halyards on a clipper-brig out of New York ca.1840s. Other such multi-job songs were: "Round the Corn(er), Sally", "Fire Down Below", "Johnny Come Down to Hilo", "Hilo, Boys, Hilo", "Tommy's Gone Away", "The Sailor Likes His Bottle-O", "Highland Laddie", "Mudder Dinah", "Bully in the Alley", "Hogeye Man", "Good Morning, Ladies, All", "Pay Me the Money Down", "Alabama, John Cherokee", "Yankee John, Stormalong", and "Heave Away (My Johnnies)".

While the non-sailor occupations noted above were mainly within the purview of Black laborers, the last of them, cotton-screwing, was one in which non-Blacks also began to engage by the 1840s. These workers often came from the ranks of sailors of the trans-Atlantic cotton trade, including sailors from Britain and Ireland who, wanting to avoid the cold winter seasons on the Atlantic, went ashore to engage in the well-paid labor of cotton-screwing. A European-American who did just that in 1845 in New Orleans wrote,

The day after our arrival the crew formed themselves into two gangs and obtained employment at screwing cotton by the day ... With the aid of a set of jack-screws and a ditty, we would stow away huge bales of cotton, singing all the while. The song enlivened the gang and seemed to make the work much easier.

Shanty-writer Stan Hugill called Mobile Bay—one of the main cotton outports—a "shanty mart", at which sailors and laborers of different cultural backgrounds traded their songs.

==== Perceptions of contemporary observers ====
Commenters on the ethnic or national origins of shanties, writing in the 19th century when shanties were still in wide use, generally supposed the genre to originate in the United States and recognized parallels to African-American singing—as opposed to earlier English traditions from Britain. An early article to offer an opinion on the origin of shanties (though not calling them by that name), appearing in Oberlin College's student paper in 1858, drew a comparison between Africans' singing and sailor work songs.

Along the African coast you will hear that dirge-like strain in all their songs, as at work or paddling their canoes to and from shore, they keep time to the music. On the southern plantations you will hear it also, and in the negro melodies every where, plaintive and melodious, sad and earnest. It seems like the dirge of national degradation, the wail of a race, stricken and crushed, familiar with tyranny, submission and unrequited labor ... And here I cannot help noticing the similarity existing between the working chorus of the sailors and the dirge-like negro melody, to which my attention was specially directed by an incident I witnessed or rather heard.

The author went on to relate an incident in which he once heard "a well known strain of music", finding to his surprise that it was being sung by Black men rowing canoes. He claimed they were singing, "Heigh Jim along, Jim along Josey, Heigh Jim along, Jim along Jo!" The implication is that this song was similar to a sailor song, probably the well-known shanty, "Haul Away, Joe" or "Haul Away for Rosie", viz.: "Way, haul away; O, haul away, my Rosey; Way, haul away; O, haul away, Joe." The writer did not make a further connection to the minstrel song "Jim Along Josey", a relationship to which is obvious, although it is unknown whether this was the inspiration for the shanty or vice versa.

In much of the shanty repertoire known today one finds parallels to the minstrel songs that came to popularity from the 1840s. The poetic meter of the couplets of many minstrel songs is identical to those in shanties, and the non sequitur-type "floating verses" of those songs were heavily borrowed. In an influential early article about shanties, New York journalist William L. Alden drew a comparison between shanties and both authentic African-American songs and the quasi-African-American minstrel songs:

The old sailor songs had a peculiar individuality. They were barbaric in their wild melody. The only songs that in any way resemble them in character are "Dixie", and two or three other so-called negro songs by the same writer. This man, known in the minstrel profession as "Old Emmett", caught the true spirit of the African melodies—the lawless, half-mournful, half-exulting songs of the Kroomen. These and the sailor songs could never have been the songs of civilized men ... Undoubtedly many sailor songs have a negro origin. They are the reminiscences of melodies sung by negroes stowing cotton in the holds of ships in Southern ports. The "shanty-men", those hards of the forecastle, have preserved to some extent the meaningless words of negro choruses, and have modified the melodies so as to fit them for salt-water purposes. Certain other songs were unmistakably the work of English sailors of an uncertain but very remote period.

Alden was not writing as a research historian, but rather as an observer of the then-current shanty-singing. His, then, was an impression of shanties based on their style and manner of performance, and he was writing at a time when shanties had yet to become framed by writers and media as belonging to any canon of national "folk music".

An English author of the period, William Clark Russell, expressed his belief in several works that shanties were American in origin.

I think it may be taken that we owe the sailors' working song as we now possess it to the Americans. How far do these songs date back? I doubt if the most ancient amongst them is much older than the century. It is noteworthy that the old voyagers do not hint at the sailors singing out or encouraging their efforts by choruses when at work. In the navy, of course, this sort of song was never permitted. Work proceeded to the strains of a fiddle, to the piping of the boatswain and his mates, or in earlier times yet, to the trumpet. The working song then is peculiar to the Merchant Service, but one may hunt through the old chronicles without encountering a suggestion of its existence prior to American independence and to the establishment of a Yankee marine.

As time wore on and shanties were established as an indispensable tool aboard the ships of many nations carrying heterogeneous crew, inspiration from several national and cultural traditions fed into the repertoire and their style was subsequently shaped by countless individuals. Whatever their fundamental origins, by the late 19th century shanties constituted the heritage of international seamen, with little or no necessary national associations.

=== 19th century ===
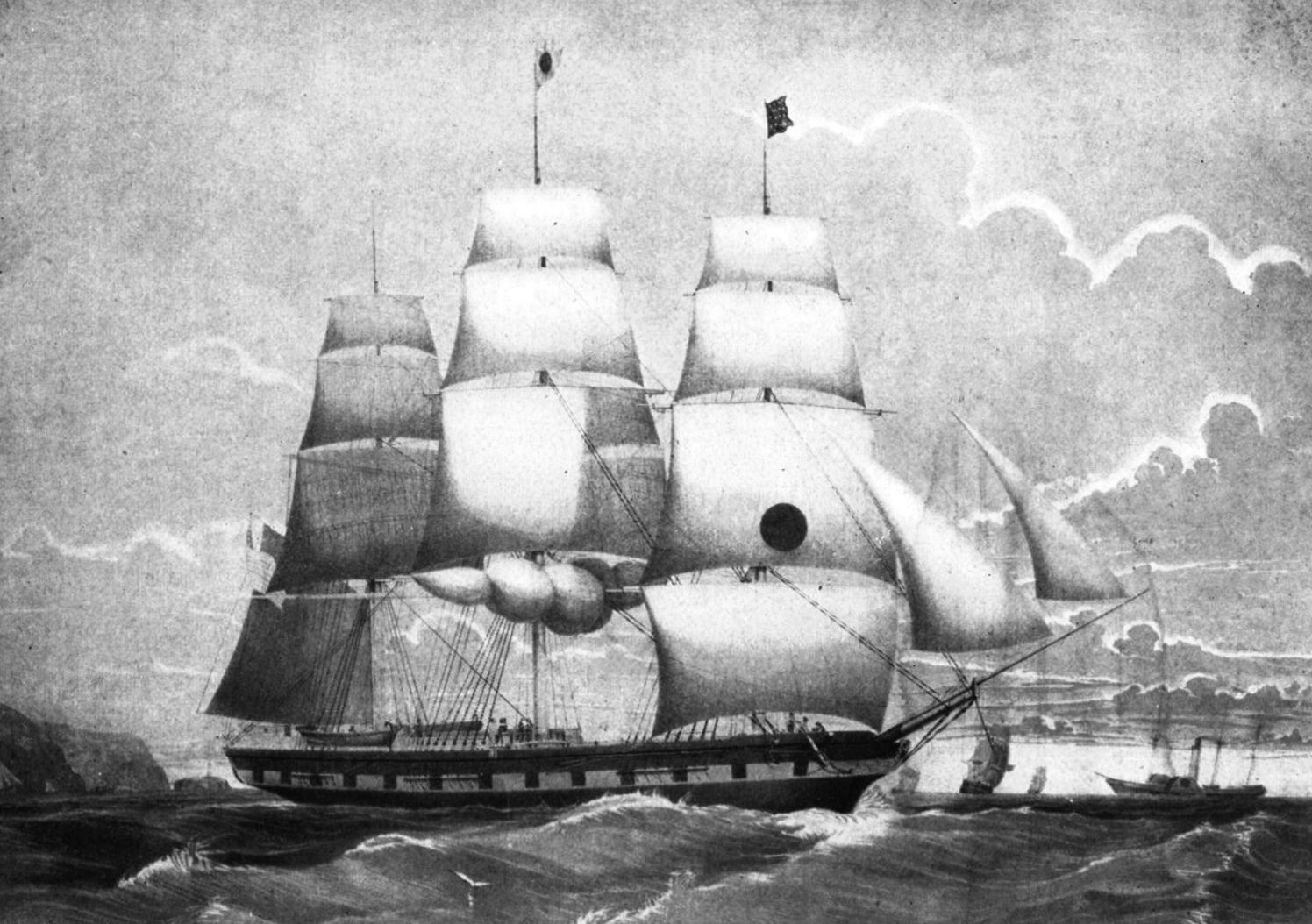
An American packet ship of the Black Ball Line

==== New ships and new requirements ====
Writers have characterized the origin of shanties (or perhaps a revival in shanties, as William Main Doerflinger theorized) as belonging to an era immediately following the War of 1812 and up to the American Civil War. This was a time when there was relative peace on the seas and shipping was flourishing. Packet ships carried cargo and passengers on fixed schedules across the globe. Packet ships were larger and yet sailed with fewer crew than vessels of earlier eras, in addition to the fact that they were expected on strict schedules. These requirements called for an efficient and disciplined use of human labor. American vessels, especially, gained reputations for cruelty as officers demanded high results from their crew. The shanties of the 19th century could be characterized as a sort of new "technology" adopted by sailors to adapt to this way of shipboard life.

Recent research has considered a wider range of 19th century sources than had been possible by 20th-century writers. The evidence from these sources suggests that even in the mid-1830s the genre was still developing, which shifts the period of the rise and flourishing of shanties to a bit later than was previously accepted. The general silence of the historical record on modern shanties until as late as the 1840s, even as shipping shifted to the even faster clipper ships, suggests that they may not have come into widespread use until the middle of the century. They received a boost from the heavy emigrant movement of gold rushes in California and Australia. Popular shanties of the 1850s included "A Hundred Years Ago", "One More Day", "Santiana", "Haul on the Bowline", "Across the Western Ocean", and especially "Stormalong".

==== Heyday and decline ====
By the time of the American Civil War, the shanty form was fully developed, after which its repertoire grew and its implementation was widespread and rather standardized. The decade of the 1870s represents the zenith of the genre; those sailors who first went to sea after that decade are considered not to have seen shanties in their prime. In 1882, due to the proliferation of steamships, Alden was already lamenting the passing of shanties.

The "shanty-man"—the chorister of the old packet ship—has left no successors. In the place of a rousing "pulling song", we now hear the rattle of the steam-winch; and the modern windlass worked by steam, or the modern steam-pump, gives us the clatter of cogwheels and the hiss of steam in place of the wild choruses of other days. Singing and steam are irreconcilable. The hoarse steam-whistle is the nearest approach to music that can exist in the hot, greasy atmosphere of the steam-engine.

Other writers echoed Alden's lament through and after the 1880s; the first collections of shanties appeared in that decade, in one sense as a response to what the authors believed was a vanishing art. Shanties continued to be used to some extent so long as windjammers were, yet these were comparatively few in the early 20th century.

=== 20th century ===
==== Formative writing ====
Folklorists of the first decade of the 20th century, especially those from Britain, included shanties among their interests in collecting folk songs connected with the idea of national heritage. Cecil Sharp and his colleagues among the English Folk-Song Society were among the first to take down the lyrics and tunes of shanties directly from the lips of veteran sailors and to publish them more or less faithfully. Their efforts were matched by a number of less-rigorous articles and published collections issued by former sailors themselves. By the 1920s, the body of literature on shanties had grown quite large, yet it was of variable quality. Most editors presented "ideal" versions of songs—not reflecting any one way the shanty may have been sung, but rather a composite picture, edited for print. Bowdlerization and omission of lyrics were typical. Moreover, few authors were trained folklorists and even fewer maintained a critical historical methodology. Editors customarily published fanciful, often nostalgic introductions to the material that included unsubstantiated statements. As a result, though much of the vanishing shanty repertoire was preserved in skeletal form, aspects of the genre were re-envisioned according to contemporary perceptions.

These early 20th century collectors' choices of what to include, what to exclude, and how to frame the repertoire all had an effect on how following generations have viewed the genre. Because sailors who had sung shanties were by this time very old or dead, and the general public had little opportunity to experience performances of shanties, the representations by these authors were all the more influential in mediating information and creating the impression of "standard" versions of songs.

The English poet John Masefield, following in the footsteps of peers like Rudyard Kipling, seized upon shanties as a nostalgic literary device, and included them along with much older, non-shanty sea songs in his 1906 collection A Sailor's Garland. Although Masefield had sea experience (1891–95), he was not an expert on shanties and the versions he gave of songs cannot be assumed entirely authentic. For example, he admits to never having heard a pumping shanty, and yet he goes on to present one without citing its source. In one of his earlier articles, his shanties are set to melodies taken verbatim from Davis and Tozer's earlier work, and he mentions having utilized that and the other widely available collection (L.A. Smith, 1888) as resources. Masefield desired to connect shanties with much older English traditions and literature, and his characterization of individual items as such would prove attractive to later enthusiasts. So for example, Masefield implied that the shanty "A-roving" (which he titled "The Maid of Amsterdam") was derived from Thomas Heywood's The Tragedy of the Rape of Lucrece (1608). Lyrics and ideas from Masefield's collection became among the most quoted or plagiarized in later shanty collections, and by their sheer ubiquity these contributed to 20th century audiences' perceptions of the genre.

The 1914 collection by Frank Thomas Bullen, Songs of Sea Labour, differed from the work of writers such as Masefield in having a more practical, rather than romantic, tone. Bullen, an Englishman, was an experienced shantyman, who sailed during the heyday of shanties to ports in the Southern U.S. and the Caribbean. He took a firm stance that only true work songs should be included in his collection, thus resisting the temptation to let shanties slide into the genres of ballads or other off-duty songs. (Pressure of his publisher forced him to include two sea songs, clearly demarcated, at the end of the book.) And rather than shape the shanties to appear as narrative pieces, he noted that, since most shanties would usually be improvised, it would be disingenuous to present more than one or two sample verses. As for his framing of the genre's origins, Bullen stated his belief that, "[T]he great majority of these tunes undoubtably emanated from the negroes of the Antilles and the Southern states, a most tuneful race if ever there was one, men moreover who seemed unable to pick up a ropeyarn without a song ..." And Bullen's musicologist editor, Arnold, claimed, "[T]he majority of the Chanties are Negroid in origin ..." Bullen's insistence on including only true work songs in the collection meant that he likely omitted songs—generally those for heaving tasks, like capstan work—which had been easily borrowed from the land-based traditions of various nations. The effect of including only the most exclusively work-oriented songs meant that a higher percentage of African-American songs were represented.

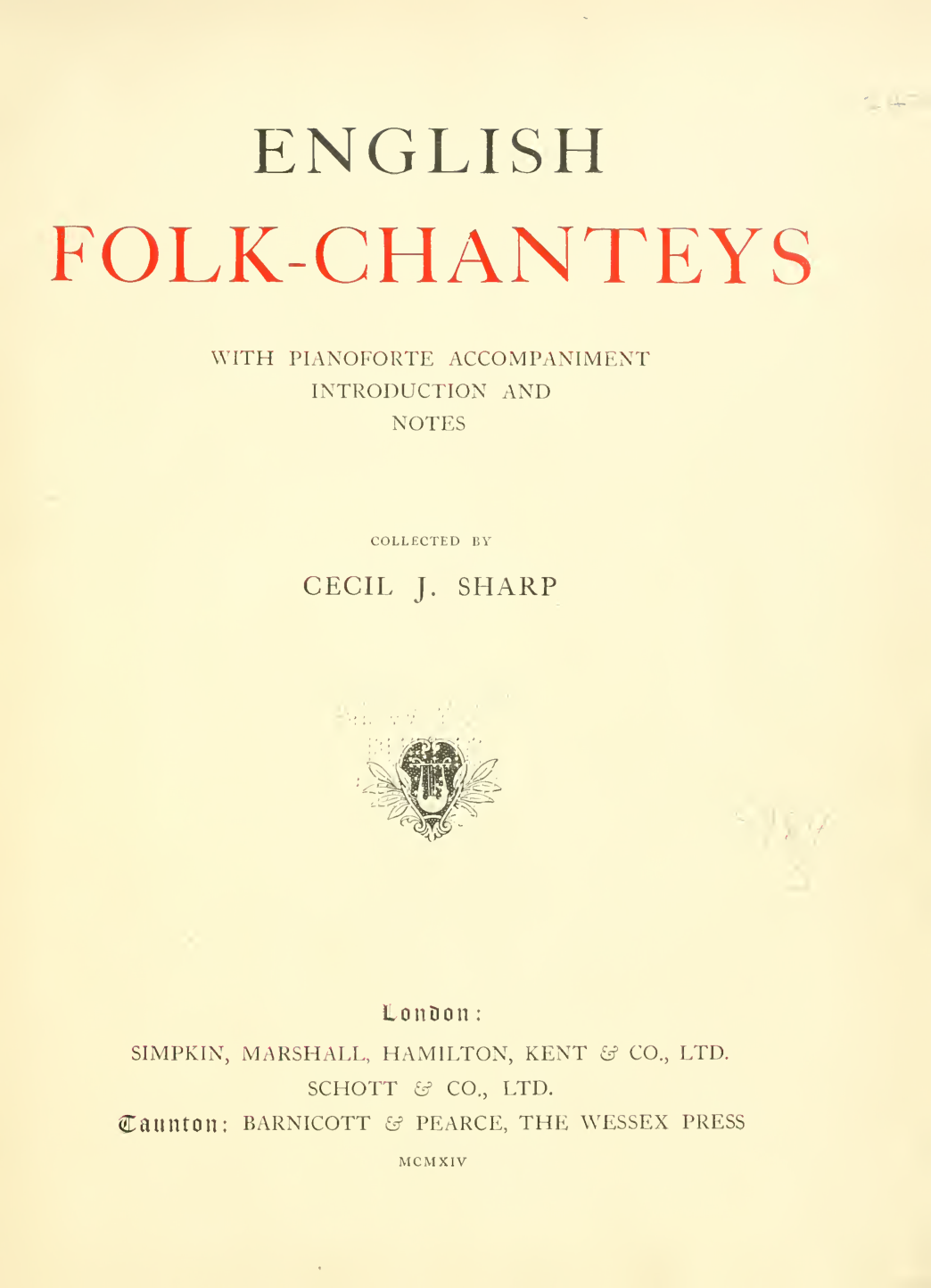
Cecil Sharp's English Folk-Chanteys (1914) was one of the first large collections of shanties made by a non-sailor and according to the methods of folklore. Its title reflects the interests and biases of its author.

Somewhere between these perspectives was Cecil Sharp's, whose English Folk-Chanteys (1914) was published in the same year, and was based on shanties he collected from aged English sailors in Britain. Sharp responds to Bullen's claims of African-American origins by ceding that many shanties were influenced through the singing of Black shantymen—a position that assumes English folk song was the core of the tradition by default. The title of Sharp's work reflects his project of collecting and grouping shanties as part of what he conceived to be a rather continuous English folk song tradition. Sharp states in the introduction that he deliberately excluded shanties which were obviously (i.e. to him) born of popular songs. This idea is problematic when one considers that the popular songs that were feeding shanties were largely American and based in real or imagined African-American musical traits. However, Sharp believed that by eliminating such shanties based on popular songs, he could concentrate those that were "folk" songs. Of his own admission, Sharp lacked any shantying or sea experience to intuitively judge shanties like someone such as Bullen, however he offers his objectivity, recording precisely what was sung to him, as consolation. While Sharp's manner of documenting shanties was more or less objective, the field of his research and his biases in what to collect certainly influenced the outcome of this study. And whereas Bullen's work was fairly inaccessible, Sharp was influential as the leader of a cohort of scholars who were actively creating the young field of folk song research.

By the 1920s, the proliferation of shanty collections had begun to facilitate a revival in shanty singing as entertainment for laypersons (see below), which in turn created a market for more shanty collections that were geared towards a general audience. Writers of the 1920s, 30s, and 40s, through their derivative, popular works, established in effect a new body of "common knowledge" about shanties that overwrote some of the knowledge of 19th century observers.

==== Field-recording ====
Shanty collection was seen as a facet of the early twentieth century folk revival. The Australian-born composer and folklorist Percy Grainger collected various shanties and recorded them on wax cylinders in the early 1900s, and the recordings are available online courtesy of the Vaughan Williams Memorial Library.

In the 1920s, while the proliferation of soft-scholarly books was reifying the shanty repertoire, a few American scholars were audio-recording some of the last surviving sailors that had sung shanties as part of their daily work: in short, field recording. James Madison Carpenter, made hundreds of recordings of shanties from singers in Britain, Ireland, and the north-eastern U.S. in the late 1920s, allowing him to make observation from an extensive set of field data. Robert Winslow Gordon, founding head of the Archive of American Folk Song at the Library of Congress, recorded sailors singing shanties in the San Francisco Bay Area in the early 1920s, and later made recordings of African-American work songs in Georgia and elsewhere, seeking to demonstrate correspondences between these and the shanty genre. Neither of these scholars had the opportunity, however, to publish major works on shanties. Similarly, Alan Lomax's work starting in the 1930s, especially his field recordings of work songs in the Caribbean and Southern U.S., makes a significant contribution to the information on extant shanty-related traditions.

From the 1940s to the 1960s, Canadian folklorist Helen Creighton collected shanties from Nova Scotia seamen, such as 'Blow the Man Down', 'Whiskey Johnny', 'The Sailor's Alphabet', 'Shenandoah' and Rio Grande. Lastly, William Main Doerflinger carefully recorded and collected shanties from singers in New York and Nova Scotia in the 1930s and 1940s, the result of which was his Songs of the Sailor and Lumberman.

English folklorist Peter Kennedy recorded Stanley Slade of Bristol, England, thought to be 'The Last Shantyman', singing several shanties including 'Haul Away, Joe', 'Leave Her, Johnny' and 'Shenandoah', and the recordings are available online via the British Library Sound Archive.

==== Stan Hugill and Shanties from the Seven Seas ====
Stan Hugill, author of Shanties from the Seven Seas. Hugill's old-time sailor image helped bolster the perceived authoritative nature of his work, in contrast to the academic, landlubber appearance of many previous scholars.

One of the most celebrated volumes on shanties produced in the 20th century is Stan Hugill's Shanties from the Seven Seas (1961). It is the largest of its kind, owing to Hugill's methodology and chronological position. With respect to methodology, Hugill aimed to be as inclusive as possible—to account for and to present, if sometimes only in fragments, any and all items of shanty repertoire that he was currently able to find. Any song that he had heard or read being attested as having been ever "used as shanty" was included—regardless of whether that song was not generally known as a shanty or if its use as a shanty was rare and incidental. The result is a varied portrait of the genre, highlighting its maximum diversity without, however, giving a focused sense of what songs were most common during the heyday of shanties or in latter eras. Hugill readily included more recently popular songs—those that evidently were not sung until after the shanty genre was experiencing decline, but which were extant when Hugill sailed (1920s–40s). He also culled from the major collections of non-English-language sailor work songs. Hugill's practice of liberally culling from all major prior works, in combination with original material from his own field experiences, makes it a handy sourcebook for performers, but a difficult work to assess in terms of historical accuracy.

With respect to chronological position, while Hugill is affectionately known as "The Last Shantyman", he was also one of the last original shanty collectors. A few original collections followed, notably Roger Abrahams' and Horace Beck's works on contemporary shantying in the Caribbean, yet most publications in the "song collection" genre are general anthologies based in Hugill and his predecessors' works. To a great extent, Shanties from the Seven Seas is considered the "last word" on shanties and the first stop as a reference. The book's "authoritative" position is bolstered by the personal image of its author. In contrast to many of the academic folklorists who had collected shanties before him, Hugill possessed the look and pedigree of an old-time sailor, and he was actually able to perform the songs from his collection at sea music festivals. Shanties from the Seven Seas and Stan Hugill's performances have had a tremendous bearing on how shanties have been understood and performed by enthusiasts since the second half of the 20th century up to today.

==== Revival ====
Even as shanty singing to accompany work aboard ships was "dying", interest was being taken in "reviving" it—as a type of leisure pastime. Most shanty singing since the mid-20th century or earlier is considered to be in such a "revival" vein.

A few of the editors of early shanty collections provided arrangements for pianoforte accompaniment with their shanties. While this may have simply been a customary way of presenting songs or attempting to frame their tonality, it may also suggest they hoped their examples could be performed, as well. One of the earliest shanty collections, Davis and Tozer's Sailor Songs or 'Chanties' (which circulated in the early 1890s), included such accompaniment, along with safe, "drawing room" style lyrics. It is unknown whether any actual performances were based on this otherwise influential work, however, the proceedings from a meeting of the Manchester Literary Club, 4 February 1895, record an instance of laypersons attempting to recreate shanty performance at that early date. In general, shanty performance by laypersons, up through the first two decades of the 20th century, would have been hindered by the lack of suitable resources, if not lack of interest.

Independent of this literature, a revival of sorts was staged by the U.S. Shipping Board in 1918 when Stanton H. King of Boston, a merchant sailor of the 1880s, was appointed as "Official Chantey Man for the American Merchant Marine." King taught shanties to the young Merchant Marine recruits, but it appears that they were used more for entertainment than work functions. A description of the daily training schedule included the following note:

Recreation includes singing, for each ship is supplied with a piano. The musical program includes old-time chanties, in which the young men are instructed by a veteran deep-water chantie man.

An on-shore revival in shanty singing for leisure was facilitated by song collections of the 1920s, especially Terry's The Shanty Book (in two volumes, 1921 and 1926). What set apart this and following collections was full musical score along with an adequate stock of lyrics. Collections prior to Terry's (except for Davis and Tozer's much earlier and contrived-sounding settings) had not provided enough verses to create "full" songs, and it is unlikely that performers would venture to improvise new verses in the manner of traditional shantymen. By 1926, it had become a custom at the Seven Seas Club in London to hold a shanty sing-along after the club's monthly dinners. By 1928, commercial recordings of shanties, performed in the manner of classical concert singing, had been released on His Master's Voice, Vocalion, Parlophone, Edison, Aco, and Columbia labels; many were realizations of scores from Terry's collection. Shanties like "Johnny Come Down to Hilo" were more or less standardized through popular dissemination.

The next revival in shanties occurred as part of the Anglophone folk music revival of the mid-20th century. The American folk revival group The Almanac Singers were recruited by Alan Lomax to record several shanties for the 1941 album Deep Sea Chanteys and Whaling Ballads. In Britain, the incorporation of shanties into the folk revival repertoire was largely led by A.L. Lloyd starting in the 1950s. An amateur folklorist, Lloyd discarded the earlier classical style of presentations in favor of a more "authentic" performance style. He was generally mysterious about the sources of his shanty arrangements; he obviously referred to collections by editors like Sharp, Colcord, and Doerflinger, however it is often unclear when and whether his versions were based in field experience or his private invention. Lloyd's album The Singing Sailor (1955) with Ewan MacColl was an early milestone, which made an impression on Stan Hugill when he was preparing his 1961 collection, particularly as the performance style it embodied was considered more appropriate than that of earlier commercial recordings. Many other performers followed, creating influential versions and interpretations of shanties that persist today. For example, Lloyd's personal interpretation of "South Australia" was taken up by the Irish folk revival group The Clancy Brothers, from which this version spread to countless folk performers to become established as the "standard" form of what is usually presented as a "traditional" shanty. The Canadian, Alan Mills (1913–1977), recorded numerous songs for Folkways Records including "Songs of the Sea" (1959). Through the mass distribution of particular shanty forms through recordings and clubs, the folk revival has had the effect of creating an impression of rather consistent forms of texts and tunes—a sharp contrast to the highly variable and often improvised nature of work-based shanty singing. Another effect, due to the fact that most folk performers sang shanties along with other genres, is that shanty repertoire was ever more incorporated within the generic fold of "folk song", and their distinctive use, manner of performance, and identity were co-opted.

With one foot firmly planted in the world of traditional shanties, the veteran sailor and author Stan Hugill also became a leader (and follower) of trends in the folk music revival. His presence as an exclusive performer of sailor songs did much to establish sea music as a revival genre apart from or within folk music. By the late 1970s, the activities of enthusiasts and scholar-performers at places like the Mystic Seaport Museum (who initiated an annual Sea Music Festival in 1979) and the San Francisco Maritime Museum established sea music—inclusive of shanties, sea songs, and other maritime music—as a genre with its own circuit of festivals, record labels, performance protocol, and so on.

== Nature of the songs ==
=== Function ===
In the days when human muscles were the only power source available aboard ship, shanties served practical functions. The rhythm of the song served to synchronize the movements of the sailors or to pace the labor as they toiled at repetitive tasks. Singing helped to alleviate boredom and to lighten, perhaps, the psychological burden of hard work. Shanties may also be said to have served a social purpose, as to build camaraderie.

=== Form ===
All shanties had a chorus of some sort, in order to allow the crew to sing all together. Many shanties had a "call and response" format, with one voice (the shantyman) singing the solo lines and the rest of the sailors bellowing short refrains in response (compare military cadence calls).

The shantyman was a regular sailor who led the others in singing. He was usually self-appointed. A sailor would not generally sign on as a shantyman per se, but took on the role in addition to their other tasks on the ship. Nevertheless, sailors reputed to be good shantymen were valued and respected.

The following example, a verse of the shanty "Boney" (in reference to Napoleon), shows the call and response form and the interplay between the voices of the shantyman and the crew.

Shantyman (solo): Boney was a warrior,
All (refrain): Way-ay-ya,
Shantyman (solo): A reg'lar bull and tarrier,
All (refrain): John François!

When working this as a short-drag shanty (see below), hands on the line would synchronize their pulls with the last syllable of each response (in italics).

=== Lyrical content ===
The practical function of shanties as work songs was given priority over their lyrics or the musicality of a performance. Due to this, shanty texts might have been poor from an aesthetic standpoint—even at times random nonsense—so long as the singing fit the form of the work song. One writer about shanties warned his readers that their lyrics, to landsmen, would "probably appear as the veriest doggerel." He went on to explain,

As a rule, the chantey in its entirety possesses neither rhyme nor reason; nevertheless, it is admirably fitted for sailors' work. Each of these sea-songs has a few stock verses or phrases to begin with, but after these are sung, the soloist must improvise, and it is principally his skill in this direction that marks the successful chantey-man.

Improvisation and stock verses were the tools of the trade of shantymen. Similar to the blues, shanties often exhibited a string of such verses without much explicit or continuous theme. While on one hand this may simply reflect the aesthetic of the music-culture from which the form originated, this, too, was a feature suited to practical restrictions. Work tasks might be of any length and often unpredictable. Songs with a fixed set of verses, or ballads, which tell a story, were not so well suited to tasks that could end abruptly at any time or that might require extending.

Improvising of lyrics in such a context could be seen as an African-American musical characteristic, as Euro-American observers of Black work-singing consistently remarked on its extempore nature. Stock verses helped the shantyman fill space when his creative faculties came up short. These might take the form of multipurpose clichés, like,

Up aloft this yard must go.
[refrain]
Up aloft from down below.
[refrain]

Or, the shantyman may use formulas, like "Were you ever in [blank]?", for example,

Were you ever down in Mobile Bay?
[refrain]
A-screwing cotton by the day?
[refrain]

(The refrain in these cases may be any; that is, the stock verses may be fitted to any of a number of shanties having a similar tune-chorus form.)

Many stock verses used phrases that "floated" between both minstrel and authentic African-American traditional songs. For example, the phrase "girl with the blue dress on" is documented in a Black muledriver's song and in a popular minstrel song, as well as in a few shanties, for example,

O wake her, O shake her,
O shake that girl with the blue dress on,
O Johnny come to Hilo;
Poor old man.

As evident from the last lyric, above, shanty lyrics were not limited to seafaring or work topics. Drawing lyrics (and sometimes entire songs) from the popular and traditional repertoires of the time meant that a wide range of themes were represented.

=== Sources ===
Shanties reflect a variety of source material. As discussed above, there is a notable correspondence between shanties and African-American songs of both work and leisure. Popular music of the time was readily adapted, especially the minstrel music genre, songs of whose couplets were often of a suitable metrical length. It is common to find phrases from minstrel songs of the late 1830s and 1840s in many shanties, like "A Long Time Ago", "Jamboree", "Johnny Come Down to Hilo", or "Johnny Bowker". Music hall songs also had an influence, for example "Paddy on the Railway". Popular marches were borrowed especially for capstan work, including "John Brown's Body" and "Marching Through Georgia". A few shanties have ballad forms, such as "The Dreadnaught", "The Banks of Newfoundland", and "The Golden Vanitee", but these were relatively uncommon and required the addition of a chorus section. However, shantymen more often adapted lyrics and themes from ballads and "spliced" them to existing shanty melodies and choruses. Other shanties were adapted from land-based traditional songs, for example "Billy Boy" and "The Derby Ram".

== Types ==
Broadly speaking, the categories for shanties can be understood in terms of whether the task(s) for which they were used was/were related to hauling or heaving. "Hauling" (pulling) actions were intermittent in nature. They required a coordinated show of focused exertion, not sustained, but rather at specific moments. Shanties for hauling tasks thus coordinated the timing of those exertions, the "pulls". "Heaving" (pushing) actions were of a continuous nature. In these, coordination was of minor importance as compared to pacing. Rather than rhythmically timing the labor, shanties for heaving were more intended to set an appropriate, manageable pace and to occupy or inspire workers throughout the duration of what could often be long tasks.

=== Types related to hauling actions ===
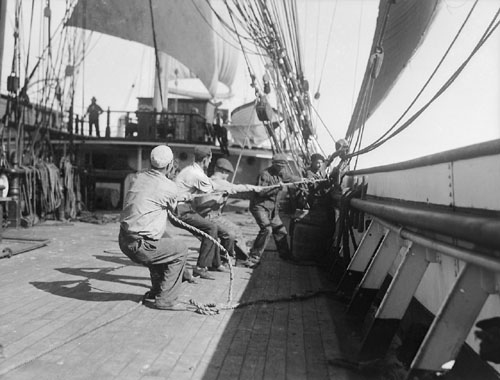
Sailors hauling a line

Long-drag shanty
Also called a "halyard shanty". Sung with the job of hauling on halyards to hoist, over an extended period, topsail or topgallant yards. Usually there are two pulls per chorus as in "Way, hey, Blow the man down!" Examples: "Hanging Johnny", "Whiskey Johnny", "A Long Time Ago", and "Blow the Man Down".
- Sample: "Hurrah for the Black Ball Line" (video), led by Peter Kasin on the ship Joseph Conrad at the Mystic Sea Music Festival, 2010.
Short-drag shanty
Also called a "[fore/main]sheet shanty". Sung for short hauling jobs requiring a few bursts of great force, such as changing direction of sails via lines called braces, or hauling taut the corners of sails with sheets or tacks. These are characterized by one strong pull per chorus, typically on the last word, as in "Way, haul away, haul away "Joe"'!" Examples: "Boney", "Haul on the Bowline", and "Haul Away Joe".
- Sample: "Haul Away Joe" (audio), sung by A. Wilkins, Eastern U.S., ca. 1930–32. From the U.S. Library of Congress, R. W. Gordon Collection.
Sweating-up chant
Also called a "swaying off chant. Sung for very brief hauling tasks, as for a few sharp pulls or "swigs" on a halyard to gain maximum tautness of a sail. These short chants are often classed as "sing-outs", but their form differs little from sheet shanties. Examples include mostly chants that have not gone under any well-known name, along with the better known "Johnny Bowker" and other short-drag shanties.
- Sample: "Haul the Woodpile Down" (audio) sung by unnamed sailor in San Francisco Bay area, early 1920s. From the U.S. Library of Congress, R. W. Gordon Collection.
Hand over hand shanty
Used for lighter hauling tasks, such as setting staysails and jibs or when simply hauling in the slack of a rope. The action is that of tugging alternately with each hand, on each beat.
- Sample: A recreation of a hand over hand chant (video), from notation by Doerflinger (1951) of Capt. James P. Barker's singing.
Bunt shanty
Used for "bousing up" (i.e. hauling) a bunt—the tightly bunched bundle of a sail that would need to be gathered up and fastened to the yard when furling. "Paddy Doyle's Boots" is universally attested as one of the few, exclusive bunt shanties. However, "Saint Helena Soldier" and "Johnny Bowker" have also been noted.
Stamp and go shanty
Also called a "runaway" or "walk away" shanty. Although technically a hauling action, the work accompanied by this type of shanty was continuous in nature. Thus the songs had longer choruses, similar to heaving shanties. The work entailed many hands taking hold of a line with their backs to the "fall" (where the line reaches the deck from aloft) and marching away with it along the deck.

On vessels of war, the drum and fife or boatswain's whistle furnish the necessary movement regulator. There, where the strength of one or two hundred men can be applied to one and the same effort, the labor is not intermittent, but continuous. The men form on either side of the rope to be hauled, and walk away with it like firemen marching with their engine. When the headmost pair bring up at the stern or bow, they part, and the two streams flow back to the starting-point, outside the following files. Thus in this perpetual "follow-my-leader" way the work is done, with more precision and steadiness than in the merchant-service.

As this maneuver could only be used on ships with large crews, such as vessels of war—in which few shanties were sung—shanties to accompany it were few in number and were not often noted in context. The most commonly cited example is "Drunken Sailor", which is thought to be one of the few shanties allowed in the Royal Navy.

=== Types related to heaving actions ===
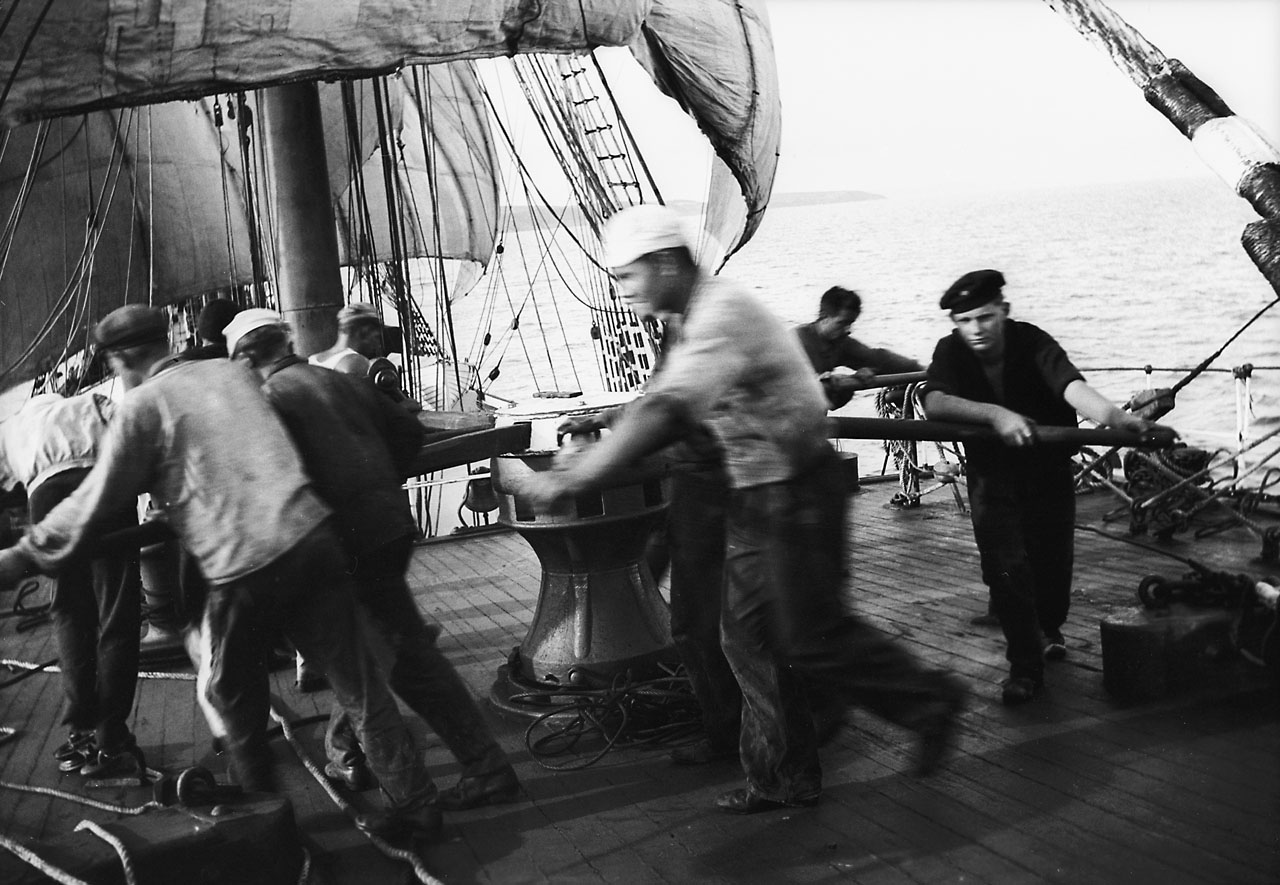
Sailors working at a capstan

Capstan shanty
Raising the anchor on a ship involved winding its rope around a capstan, a sort of giant winch, turned by sailors heaving wooden bars while walking around it. Other heavy tasks might also be assisted by using a capstan. Being a continuous action, shanties sung to accompany these tasks might have longer solo verses and, frequently, a "grand chorus", in addition to the call-and-response form. Examples: "Santianna", "Paddy Lay Back", "Rio Grande", "Clear the Track, Let the Bulgine Run", "Shenandoah", and "John Brown's Body".
- Sample: Roll the Old Chariot Along (audio) sung by unnamed sailor in San Francisco Bay area, early 1920s. From the U.S. Library of Congress, R. W. Gordon Collection.
Windlass shanty
Modern shanties were used to accompany work at the patent windlass, which was designed to raise anchor and was operated by the see-saw like action of pumping hand brakes. The up and down motion of the brake levers lent the action a binary form that was well-suited by many of the same songs used as halyard shanties. And yet, the continuous nature of the task also meant grand choruses were possible. So while halyard shanties and capstan shanties tended to be exclusive of one another, windlass shanties sometimes shared repertoire with each of those other types. Examples: "Sally Brown", "Heave Away, My Johnnies", and "Mister Stormalong".
- Sample: "Sally Brown" (video), led by Gibb Schreffler on the barkentine Gazela, 2022.
Pump shanty

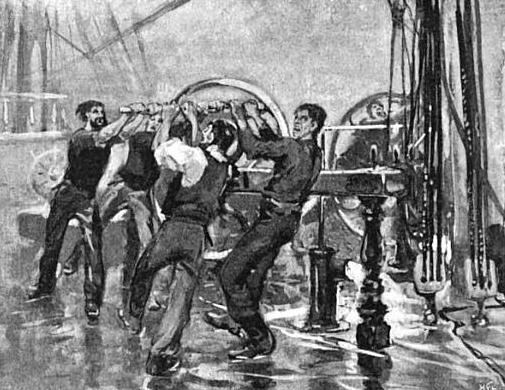
Operation of Downton pump

Because of leakage of water into the holds of wooden ships, they had to be regularly pumped out. The frequency and monotony of this task inspired the singing of many shanties. One design of pump worked very similarly to the brake windlass, while another, the Downton pump, was turned by handles attached to large wheels. Examples: "Strike the Bell", "Fire Down Below", "South Australia", and "One More Day". An example of special note is "Leave Her, Johnny, Leave Her" (also known as "Time for Us to Leave Her"), which was generally sung during the last round of pumping the ship dry once it was tied up in port, prior to the crew leaving the ship at the end of the voyage.

=== Other types ===
Miscellaneous deep-water shanties
Shanties might come into play for miscellaneous additional shipboard tasks. For example, songs used to accompany the work of holystoning the deck have been attested. "Poor Old Man" (also known as "Poor Old Horse" or "The Dead Horse") was sung in a ritual fashion once the sailors had worked off their advance pay (the so-called "dead horse") a month into the voyage. The ceremony involved hauling a stuffed facsimile of a horse up to the yardarm, before letting it drop into the sea, all the while singing this customary shanty.
Coastwise and longshore shanties
Shanties have also been well-documented in use for tasks other than those of the deep-water sailor. The working of cargo was performed by stevedores to the accompaniment of shanties, for example in the tradition of the Georgia Sea Island Singers of St. Simons Island, Georgia. They used such shanties as "Knock a Man Down" (a variation of "Blow the Man Down") to load heavy timber. The category of menhaden chanties refers to work songs used on menhaden fishing boats, sung while pulling up the purse-seine nets. The musical forms, and consequently the repertoire, of menhaden chanties differ significantly from the deep-water shanties, most noticeably in the fact that the workers "pull" in between rather than concurrently with certain words of the songs. Common examples are "The Johnson Girls" and "Won't You Help Me to Raise 'Em Boys". Off-shore whalermen in parts of the Caribbean sang shanties whilst rowing their whaleboats and when hauling their catch onto land.
- Sample: A menhaden chantey, "Won't You Help Me to Raise Um" (video), performed by The Northern Neck Chantey Singers of Virginia.
- Sample: A demonstration of whaleboat shanties (video), by The Barrouallie Whalers of St. Vincent & the Grenadines.

The above categories, with respect to the repertoire they contain, are not absolute. Sailors often took a song from one category and, with necessary alterations to the rhythm, tempo, or form, used it for a different task. This can be seen in the frequent lack of consensus, among different writers and informants, as to what job a given shanty was used for.

== "Shanties" versus "sea songs" ==
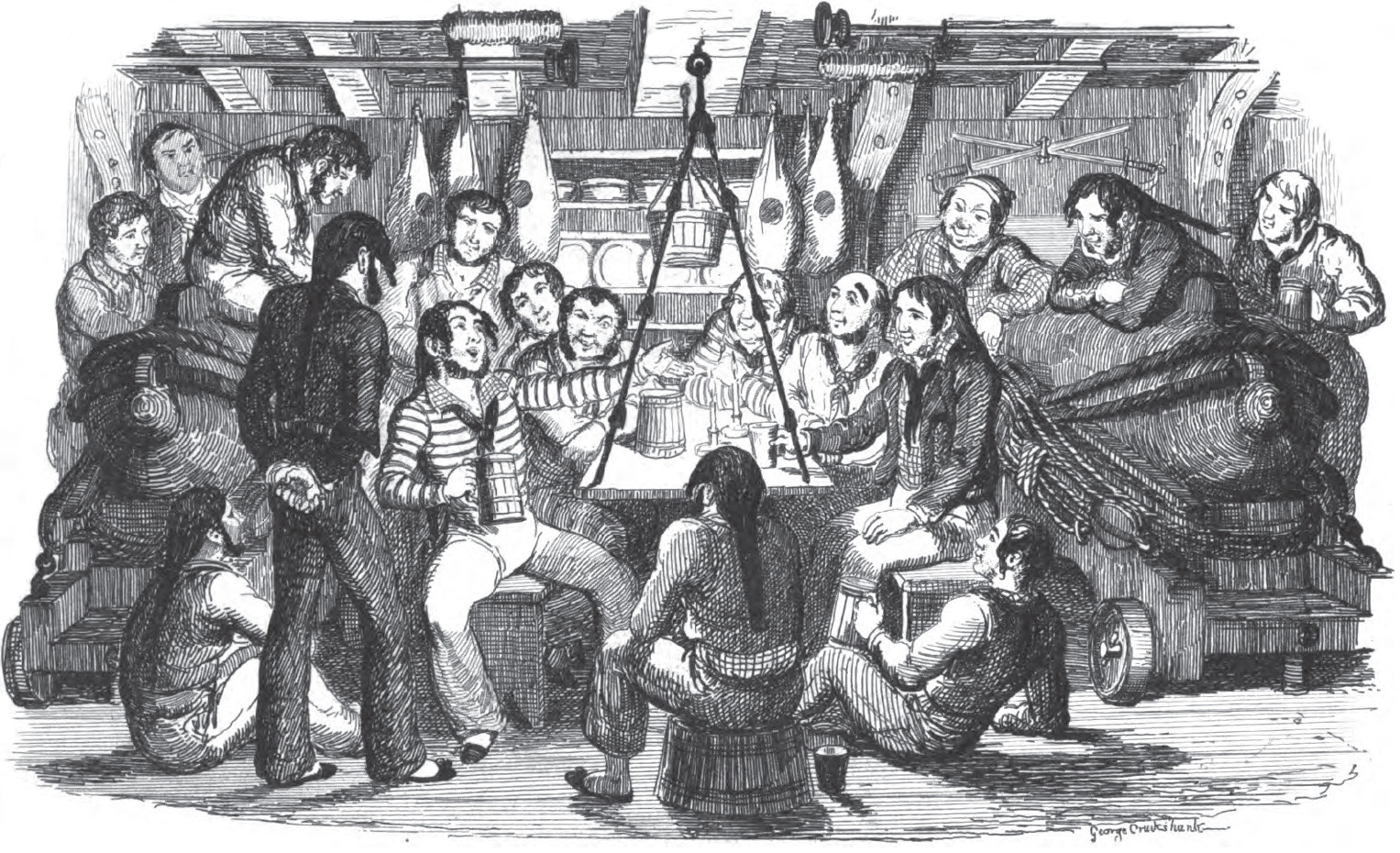
Early 19th century Royal Navy sailors singing while off duty

Shanties are work songs and were originally sung only for work. However, sailors also sang for pleasure in the forecastle where they slept or, in fine weather, gathered near the fore bitts (large posts on the foredeck). While songs with maritime themes were sung, all manner of popular songs and ballads on any subject might be sung off watch. The leisure songs associated with sailors are labeled simply as "sea songs", but they have no consistent formal characteristics. They are also popularly known among enthusiasts, especially when distinguishing them from shanties, as fo'c's'le songs or forebitters. Although those terms were not in great evidence in the 19th century, some literary references to "fore-bitter" and, less so, "fo'c'sle song", attest to their use even prior to the appearance of "shanty". Unlike shanties, during the singing of which one's hands were occupied, sea songs might be sung to the accompaniment of handy instruments like fiddle or concertina.

Examples of sea songs include "Spanish Ladies", first popular in the Royal Navy, and "The Stately Southerner", a ballad about a U.S. war ship. Examples of sea songs that were poorly documented in the sailing era, but which gained great popularity among singers in the revival era, are "The Leaving of Liverpool" and "Rolling Down to Old Maui".

== In languages other than English ==
While the crews of merchant ships in which shanties were sung might have come from a wide variety of national and ethnic backgrounds and might have spoken various mother-tongues, the shanty genre was by and large an English-language phenomenon. However, non-English-language sailor work songs were also developed. They are generally of these types:

- Preexisting non-English-language songs from the popular or folk song traditions of a linguistic group, which were adapted to the shanty paradigm;
- Preexisting, original shipboard worksongs from non-English-speaking peoples, retrofitted to the definition of "shanty";
- Newly created non-English-language songs, designed to fit the established shanty paradigm;
- Translations of English shanties into other languages, often preserving their English choruses.

There are notable bodies of shanty repertoire in Swedish, Norwegian, Dutch, French, Breton, and Welsh, and shanties have been translated into Polish and German. The terms for shanties in these languages do not always precisely correlate with English usage. In French, chant de marin or "sailor's song" is a broad category that includes both work and leisure songs. Swedish uses sjömansvisa, "sailor song", as a broad category, but tends to use the borrowed "shanty" to denote a work song. Similarly, Norwegian uses sjømannsvise as the broad category and the borrowed term sjanti (also spelled "shanty") or the native oppsang for work songs. The equivalents in German are Seemannslied and, again, shanty. Polish uses a word derived from English: szanta.

The traditional Japanese fisherman's worksong Sōran Bushi, originally from Hokkaido, has been described as a shanty.

Substantial collections of non-English shanties include the following, which have been instrumental in forming the modern day sailor song repertoires of revival performers in their respective languages:

French
Hayet, Capt. Armand: Chansons de Bord. Paris: Editions Eos (1927).
German
Baltzer, R. and Klaus Prigge. "Knurrhahn": Sammlung deutscher und englischer Seemannslieder und Shanties wie sie auf deutschen Segelschiffen gesungen wurden. Vol. 1, 2. Kiel: A. C. Ehlers (1935–6).
Norwegian
Brochmann, H. Opsang fra Seilskibstiden. Christiania: Norske Förlags Kompani Ltd. (1916).
Swedish
Sternvall, Sigurd. Sång under Segel. Stockholm: Albert Bonniers Förlag (1935).

== Performance today ==
Historically, shanties were usually not sung outside of work contexts, and singing sea songs was generally the purview of sailors. However, since their revival as leisure songs among laypersons they have been performed in a variety of contexts. Similarly to Euro-American folk music, shanties and sea songs are performed both informally by amateurs and as commercial entertainment by professionals, with many performers straddling both contexts. Some performers focus on shanties, sea songs, and related material, as part of the genre of maritime music, whereas in other cases performers of popular music (including the Folk genre) and classical music bring songs from the shanty repertoire into their own.

=== Regional trends ===
Devoted performances of shanties display certain customs and general trends in different areas. However, the genre is an international one; practices vary freely and are not limited to the following generalizations.

==== North America ====
In North America, as of 2011 enthusiasts can gather at regularly scheduled, open singing sessions. For example, "chantey sings" have been held monthly aboard the ship Balclutha in San Francisco and weekly in Gloucester, Massachusetts. At these sessions, any participant is free to start up and lead a shanty, which the rest of those present—sometimes over one hundred or more participants—join on the choruses. The gatherings aim for an inclusive atmosphere that welcomes people of all ages, genders, ethnicities, and singing abilities. North American professionals often perform solo or in very small groups, frequently using instruments. One of America's oldest inns, The Griswold Inn in Essex, Connecticut, has hosted Monday evening sea chantey sessions since 1972, originally led by Cliff Haslam and later joined by other musicians as The Jovial Crew.

Annual maritime festivals in coastal towns provide a gathering point for both amateurs and professionals, and the site for the introduction of new interpretations.

==== United Kingdom ====
In the UK, shanties find a venue in pubs that host "folk clubs". Professional performers tend to be in larger groups with a more substantial chorus, allowing for a capella performances. They are frequently identified with a specific port town to which they belong. Many annual maritime festivals in Britain and across the Channel provide contexts for performance.

==== Continental Europe ====
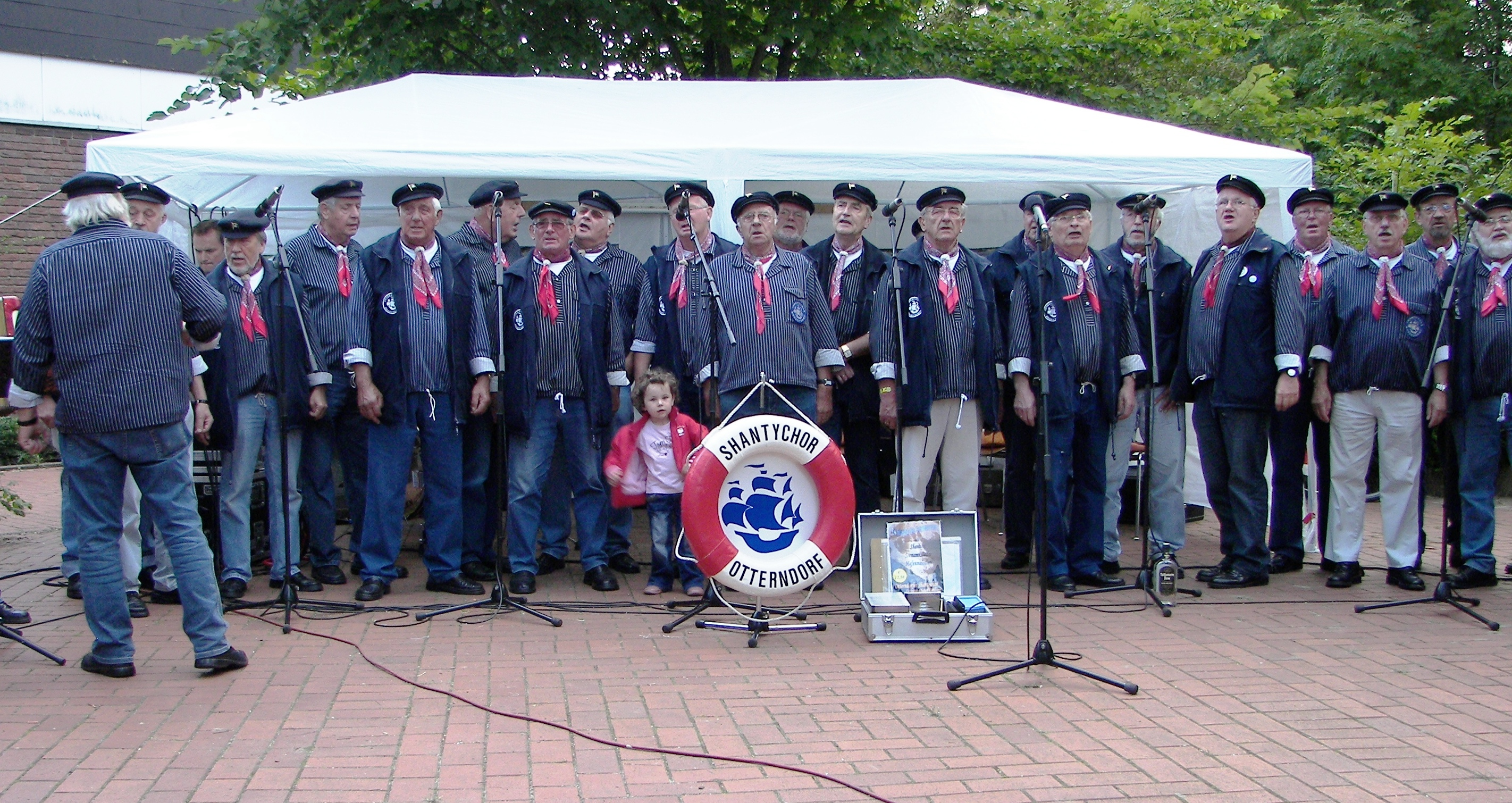
A German shanty choir

Shanty choirs (German Shantychor, Dutch shantykoor) are choral groups – often with many members – that perform only sailor songs. They are especially popular in the Netherlands, Germany, and Norway. Polish performers of shanties favor medium-sized groups, often singing in harmony, accompanying themselves on instruments, and presenting themselves similarly to the way a rock band would.

==== Australia ====
Sea Shanty Groups are active across Australia including Perth, Fremantle, and Albany. A group called The Anchormen formed by Matthew Wearne and Colin Anker in 2018, perform regular gigs in Bunbury, Western Australia. They performed at the City of Albany Maritime Festival in 2021. Anker said regarding Mental Health "We've had guys in the group say this is the only place where they feel comfortable in that no one judges them. We often face and perform to each other instead of the audience. It's a brotherhood. When you start singing sea shanties, it just grabs you and draws you in. You can't stop listening to and singing them." A favourite song is Spanish Ladies.

=== Shanties borrowed by other genres ===
Items from the shanty and sea song repertoire have been brought into the repertoires of performers of folk music, rock, country, and Western classical music. Sources for these renditions include books by folklorists and commercial recordings by shanty revival performers. The forms these performers produce tend to be quite standardized and relate to their source material similar to the way a cover song does. This can be contrasted with the method of performers focusing on maritime music, who tend to think of themselves as operating within that genre or a tradition, and who develop their repertoire from multiple sources and through various experiences.

==== Folk ====
The folk revival movement is one in which shanties themselves were often revived, especially as they have been viewed as a branch of heritage traditional songs of Anglophone culture. Several of the early performers in the Folk genre performed and recorded a significant number of sailor songs. For example, Paul Clayton recorded the album Whaling and Sailing Songs from the Days of Moby Dick (Tradition Records) in 1956, and Burl Ives' Down to the Sea in Ships came out in the same year. Since at least the 1950s, certain shanties have become staples of the Folk genre. This is evidenced in the popular Folk music fake book Rise Up Singing, which includes such shanties as "Blow the Man Down", "What Shall We Do with a Drunken Sailor", and "Bound for South Australia".

==== Rock ====
Borrowings into Rock music have often resulted from the fluid borders between Folk and Rock performers and audiences. For example, Bruce Springsteen's "Pay Me My Money Down" derives from the interpretation by the Folk group The Weavers, who in turn found it among the collected shanties once traditionally performed by residents of the Georgia Sea Islands. Some Rock performers, too, have been inspired to adopt shanties as part of what they perceive to be a connection to their regional or national heritage. For example, The Pogues recorded "Poor Paddy [Works on the Railway]" in the arrangement of Folk group The Dubliners, ostensibly because of the Irish connection. Others have been fascinated by "sea" themes, including "pirates" and the perceived freedom, wildness, or debauchery of sailor culture.

==== Classical ====
Classical composers have used shanties and sea songs (or their melodies) in their works. The Australian composer Percy Grainger is a notable case. Malcolm Arnold's "Three Shanties" for woodwind quintet (1943) develops motifs from "Drunken Sailor", "Boney Was a Warrior", and "Johnny Come Down to Hilo".

=== Performance styles ===
Shanty performances today reflect a range of musical approaches and tastes. The purpose and parameters of shanty singing in the present era have had an influence on which shanties are sung and how.

Performers who favor a "traditional" style do not necessarily believe they are replicating the exact style of shanty singing of the 19th century. However, within the constraints of modern contexts, they tend to adhere to certain stylistic traits that are believed to have characterized the genre historically. These may include a loud or full voice, an emphatic, strident—even harsh—tone (as if to carry over the noise of wind and waves), and tempos and rhythms that are reasonably conducive to working. They often perform a capella or only with light instrumentation typical of sailors (e.g. concertina). In general, performances may be more "rough around the edges" and be of variable length to accommodate impromptu changes in verses.

A great many of the performers of shanties do so in what might be distinguished as a "folk music" style. They tend to be more interested in the songs themselves and less in the "shanty style" of performance, in favor of music that may be considered more pleasant, less rough, and with more variation and interest than traditional shanties offer. Stylistic characteristics include lighter vocals with a "folk" timbre, livelier tempos, and instrumental interludes between verses. Invariably these performers choose to accompany themselves on instruments such as guitar and banjo. Their rhythms may be syncopated and quite different from work song rhythms, relying on the instruments to keep time rather than the voice.

Still other performers come to shanties from backgrounds in pop, rock, or theatrical music, and perform in what may be called a "contemporary" style. Some of the preferred characteristics are smooth, pop-style vocal timbre, carefully worked out harmony, and engaging rhythms.

Less commonly—though it was the case with their earliest commercial recordings—shanties are performed in a "classical" choir style. Choirs like the Robert Shaw Chorale, the Norman Luboff Choir, and The Seafarers Chorus have released entire albums of shanties and sea songs.

== In popular media ==
Appearances of shanties, or songs and melodies labeled as "shanties", in popular media can be anachronistic and fanciful. In accord with popular perception of shanties as a genre many hundreds of years old, songs with documented existence to only the mid-19th century, at the earliest, have been freely used to portray scenes from the 18th century and earlier. By imagining modern shanties to have been in use during such eras as the Golden Age of Piracy and the Napoleonic Wars, anachronistic associations have been formed between shanties and "pirates". Evidence for all these uses and associations can be found in the examples that follow in this section. Shanties, and short videos of them being sung, saw a spike in popularity in late 2020 into early 2021 mainly due to a trend on TikTok.

=== Popular literature ===
Much of the available historical information on shanties comes from travelogue literature, most of it of scarcely notable popularity, but some of it reaching a wide audience, such as Dana's Two Years Before the Mast (1840). However, some fiction writers up through the mid-19th century, who had sailing experience, also included scenes involving sailors' work songs. Among these authors were Horace Elisha Scudder, Elijah Kellogg, and Herman Melville. In Redburn: His First Voyage, for example, Melville wrote:

I soon got used to this singing; for the sailors never touched a rope without it. Sometimes, when no one happened to strike up, and the pulling, whatever it might be, did not seem to be getting forward very well, the mate would always say, "Come, men, can't any of you sing? Sing now, and raise the dead." And then some one of them would begin, and if every man's arms were as much relieved as mine by the song, and he could pull as much better as I did, with such a cheering accompaniment, I am sure the song was well worth the breath expended on it. It is a great thing in a sailor to know how to sing well, for he gets a great name by it from the officers, and a good deal of popularity among his shipmates. Some sea-captains, before shipping a man, always ask him whether he can sing out at a rope.

The shanty genre was unfamiliar to much of the lay public until it was publicized in the 1880s, however, so most of the popular references in fiction do not begin until that decade. A well-known early example, though not strictly speaking a reference to a shanty, is the song "Fifteen men on the dead man's chest", which was invented by Robert Louis Stevenson for his novel Treasure Island (1883). Quotes of "Blow the Man Down" were particularly plentiful. Rudyard Kipling romanticized the idea of the sailor's sea song within the poetic genre with his works "The First Chantey" and "The Last Chantey" (1893).

=== Popular music ===
While shanties were historically understood as work songs, the word "shanty" has often been used in popular culture since the mid-20th century as a catch-all term that also includes songs supposed to have been sung during leisure time at sea, and even other songs about the sea or which vaguely inspire thoughts of the sea. Much of the historical shanty repertoire, being by definition designed to suit work, is less attractive as entertainment listening. The musical forms were highly repetitive, and the lyrics were quite often doggerel without any cohesive or preconceived composition. For these reasons, sea songs that were never or only exceptionally adapted as shanties—but which have engaging melodies and texts—have proved popular to 20th century audiences under the rubric of "shanties". Both these non-shanty sailor songs and the historical repertoire of shanties are typically performed with instrumental accompaniment—something that was rare or unheard of at sea in the case of authentic shanties.

==== Popular musical interpretations of traditional repertoire ====
Music performers with no strong links to maritime music have interpreted traditional shanty and sea song compositions, of which widely scattered instances abound. For example, the bawdy sea song "Frigging in the Rigging" was recorded by the punk band Sex Pistols. Perhaps under the influence of Irish folk revival groups like The Clancy Brothers and The Dubliners, who included some shanties in their repertoires, some association has also been formed between shanties and Irish music. And so, looking back to these performers, later Irish-oriented rock groups like The Pogues interpreted traditional shanties and sea songs like "South Australia" and "The Greenland Whale Fisheries". A notable instance where many non-maritime music performers tackled the traditional maritime repertoire stems from the actor Johnny Depp's reported interest in shanties that developed while filming Pirates of the Caribbean. As a result, in 2006 Depp helped facilitate Rogue's Gallery: Pirate Ballads, Sea Songs, and Chanteys. A medley of sea songs performed by concert orchestra, Sir Henry Wood's Fantasia on British Sea Songs, is a popular component of the Last Night of the Proms in Britain. In 2021, sea shanties trended on TikTok after a viral rendition of the sea-themed song "Wellerman", performed by Scotland-based postman Nathan Evans and popularly mistaken to be a shanty, inspired users to seek and perform songs in the genre.

==== New compositions in "shanty" style ====
The musical style of shanties has also inspired new musical compositions, ranging from those designed to imitate 19th century song-style to those merely intended to evoke seafaring culture through evocative phrases and token musical features. For example, the Stan Rogers song, "Barrett's Privateers", being sung in a traditional style and having lyrics that relate an anecdote of maritime history, makes a convincing sea ballad and has been adopted into the repertoire of maritime music performers. Another newly composed song by folk singer Steve Goodman, "Lincoln Park Pirates", uses the phrase, "Way, hey, tow 'em away", imitating shanty choruses while at the same time anachronistically evoking the "piracy" in its subject. The theme song for the television show SpongeBob SquarePants has a shanty-like call and response structure and begins with a melodic phrase that matches the traditional "Blow the Man Down", presumably because the character "lives in a pineapple under the sea." The theme to Gilligan's Island was also inspired by shanty structure and style. An example of a more tenuous link between a new composition labeled as "shanty" and the salient characteristics of the genre, The Pogues recorded a song called "Sea Shanty". The only characteristic it appears to share with the shanty genre is a 6/8 meter (displayed by some well known shanties like "Blow the Man Down").

English composer Michael Maybrick (alias Stephen Adams) sold a hundred thousand copies of an 1876 song Nancy Lee in Seafaring style, with lyrics by Frederick Weatherly concerning an archetypal sailors wife. The song evoked an 1882 response Susie Bell from Australian composer Frederick Augustus Packer in the far flung British colony at Port Arthur, South Australia.

=== In film and television ===
Songs from the shanty repertoire have appeared in motion pictures. These most often are not portrayed in an appropriate work context and sometimes not even a shipboard context, and many times they can be classed as anachronisms that serve to bring color and interest to the drama. The following is a sample list of notable films to have included traditional shanty repertoire.

- The Phantom Ship (1935): "Whiskey Johnny", "New York Girls", "Johnny Come Down to Hilo", "Sally Brown"
- Mutiny on the Bounty (1935): "Drunken Sailor" (tune only), "Hanging Johnny"
- Captains Courageous (1937): "Blow the Man Down", "Drunken Sailor"
- The Ghost Ship (1943): "Blow the Man Down"
- The Curse of the Cat People (1944): "Reuben Ranzo"
- Great Expectations (1946): "Sally Brown"
- Treasure Island (1950): "Johnny Come Down to Hilo" (tune only)
- Against All Flags (1952): "Haul on the Bowline"
- Moby Dick (1956): "Come Down You Bunch of Roses" (as "Blood Red Roses"), "Heave Away, My Johnnies", "The Maid of Amsterdam (A-Roving)", "Paddy Doyle's Boots", "Sally Brown", "Reuben Ranzo"
- The Buccaneers (1956–1957): "Blow ye winds of morning", "The Maid of Amsterdam", "Oh Shenandoah", "Spanish Ladies", "Blow the Man Down", "Johnny Come Down to Hilo", and others
- Billy Budd (1962): "Hanging Johnny"
- Jaws (1975) : "Spanish Ladies"
- Roots (1977): "Haul the Bowline", "Haul Away, Joe"—on the brig Unicorn
- Lonesome Dove (1989): "Rise Me Up from Down Below" (aka "Whiskey-O")
- Down Periscope (1996): "Blow the Man Down"
- Moby Dick (1998): "New York Girls", "Cape Cod Girls" ("Bound Away to Australia"), "Donkey Riding", and "Haul Away Joe"
- SpongeBob SquarePants (1999): "Blow The Man Down" also borrowed into the theme, "Drunken Sailor", "Spanish Ladies" among others
- Gangs of New York (2002): "New York Girls"
- Master and Commander: The Far Side of the World (2003): "Don't Forget Your Old Shipmate" and "Spanish Ladies"
- Pirates of the Caribbean (film series): "Yo Ho, A Pirate's Life for Me", "Fifteen Men on a Dead Man's Chest", "Hoist the Colors", "Jolly Sailor Bold"
- Moby Dick (2011): "Lowlands Away", "Blow You Winds Southerly", "Blood Red Roses", "The Hog-Eye Man", "Leave Her Johnny", "Haul Away Joe"
- Treasure Island (2012): "Lowlands Away My John"
- The Big Bang Theory (2012): "Blow the Man Down"
- The Polar Sea (2014): "Northwest Passage"
- The Finest Hours (2016): "Haul Away, Joe"
- Blow the Man Down (2019): "Blow the Man Down"
- The Lighthouse (2019): "Doodle Let Me Go "
- Fisherman's Friends (2019): "Island Records released the Fisherman's Friends original soundtrack titled Keep Hauling"
- Saturday Night Live (2021): "Sea Shanty" with host Regé-Jean Page
- The Tonight Show Starring Jimmy Fallon (2025): "Red Storm Sea Shanty" with host Jimmy Fallon Head Coach Rick Pitino and the St. John's Red Storm men's basketball Team

=== In video games ===
- In Assassin's Creed IV: Black Flag and its remake Assassin's Creed Black Flag Resynced – set during the Golden Age of Piracy – the player character, the pirate Edward Kenway, can collect a number of sea shanties which his crew will then sing while on a voyage.
- In Assassin's Creed Rogue – set during the Seven Years' War – sea shanties are available when on the player character, Assassin turned Templar Shay Patrick Cormac's ship, the Morrigan. Some are immediately available, while others must be collected.
- In Red Dead Redemption 2, the character Simon Pearson, a former sailor, will sing the sea shanty "Homeward Bound" at the campsite while playing a concertina.
- In Pillars of Eternity II: Deadfire, if the player's ship crew have a high morale score, sea shanties will be played while the player travels around the game's overworld. These sea shanties are all based on real-world sea shanties, with the lyrics altered to add references to characters, locations and events within the game's fictional universe (the game's developers, Obsidian Entertainment, did something similar with cowboy songs in Fallout: New Vegas):
  - "Aim'Spirente", based on "Santianna"
  - "Roll the Old Berath's Wheel", based on "Roll the Old Chariot Along"
  - "The Faithful Sailor", based on "The Faithful Sailor Boy"
  - "Heave Away my Lendry", based on "Heave Away My Johnny"
  - "Haul Away and Go", based on "Haul Away Joe"
  - "Deadfire Lines", based on "The Black Ball Line"
- In Warframe, a sea shanty-style song, "Sleeping in the Cold Below", plays in the segment where player controls Sevagoth's Exalted Shadow in the mission "Call of the Tempestarii".

== See also ==
- Sailing ship
- Lace tells
- Work song
- Military cadence
- List of maritime music performers
- List of maritime music festivals
- Shosholoza
