= Mitch Epstein =

American photographer (born 1952)

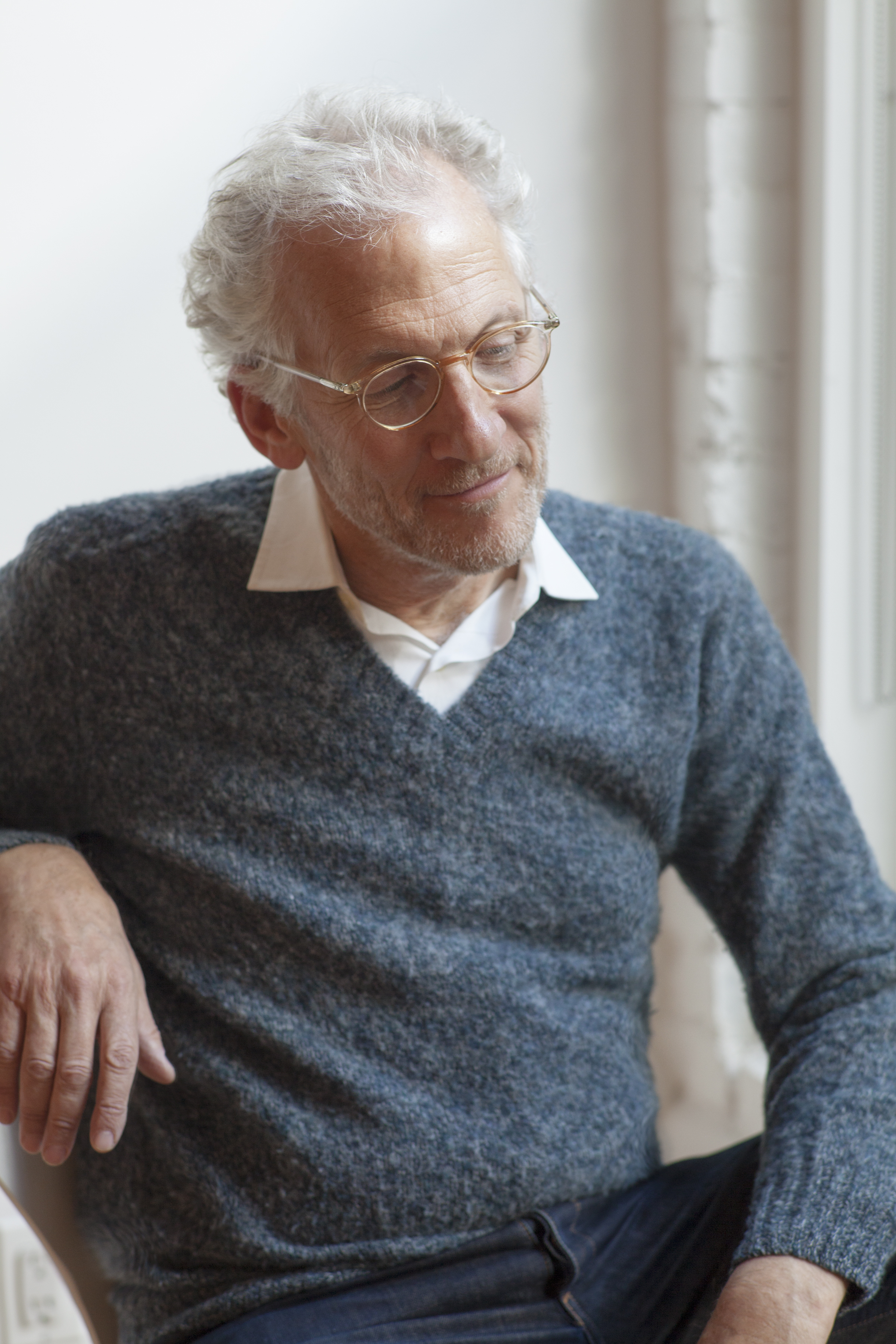
- Epstein in 2014
- Born: circa 1952 (age 73–74)
- Education: Rhode Island School of Design; Cooper Union
- Known for: Photography
- Notable work: American Power
- Spouse(s): Mira Nair (m. 1981; div. 1989) Susan Bell (m. 1994)
- Awards: Prix Pictet; 2011 American Power; Guna S. Mundheim Fellow in the Visual Arts; 2008 Berlin Prize
- Website: www.mitchepstein.net

Mitchell Epstein (August 23, 1952) is an American photographer and author. His books include Vietnam: A Book of Changes (1997); Family Business (2003), which won the 2004 Kraszna-Krausz Photography Book Award; Recreation: American Photographs 1973–1988 (2005); Mitch Epstein: Work (2006); American Power (2009); Berlin (2011); New York Arbor (2013); Rocks and Clouds (2018); Sunshine Hotel (2019); In India (2021); and Property Rights (2021).

He has also worked in various roles on several films. He was responsible for production design on his ex-wife Mira Nair's films Salaam Bombay! (1988) and Mississippi Masala (1991), and was co-producer on the latter.

Epstein's work is held in the collections of the Museum of Modern Art, New York, Whitney Museum of American Art, J. Paul Getty Museum, San Francisco Museum of Modern Art and Tate Modern, London.

== Early life and education ==
Mitch Epstein was born August 23, 1952, and raised in a Jewish family in Holyoke, Massachusetts.

He graduated from Williston Academy, where he studied with artist and bookmaker Barry Moser. In the early 1970s he studied at Union College, New York; Rhode Island School of Design, Rhode Island, and the Cooper Union, New York, where he was a student of photographer Garry Winogrand.

== Career ==
By the mid-1970s, Epstein had abandoned his academic studies and begun to travel, embarking on a photographic exploration of the United States. Ten of the photographs he made during this period were in a 1977 group exhibition at Light Gallery in New York. Ben Lifson wrote in his Village Voice review:

"He stands between artistic tradition and originality and makes pictures about abandoned rocking-horses and danger, about middle-age dazzled by spring blossoms, about children confused by sex and beasts. He has learned the terms of black-and-white photography, and although he adds color, he hasn't abandoned them, loving photography's past while trying to step into its future."

In 1978, he journeyed to India with his future wife, director Mira Nair, where he was a producer, production designer, and cinematographer on several films, including India Cabaret. He did the production design on Salaam Bombay! (1988) and Mississippi Masala (1991), and co-produced the latter. His book In Pursuit of India is a compilation of his Indian photographs from this period.

=== Vietnam: A Book of Changes. ===
From 1992 to 1995, Epstein photographed in Vietnam, which resulted in an exhibition of this work at Wooster Gardens in New York, along with a book titled Vietnam: A Book of Changes. Reviewing an exhibition of the Vietnam pictures for Art in America, Peter von Ziegesar writes, "In a show full of small pleasures, little prepares one for the stunning epiphany contained in Perfume Pagoda…Few photographers have managed to make an image so loaded and so beautiful at once."

=== The City ===
Having lived and traveled beyond the United States for over a decade, Epstein began to spend more time in New York City. His 1999 series The City investigated the relationship between public and private life in New York. Reviewing The City exhibition at Sikkema Jenkins in New York, Vince Aletti wrote that the pictures "[are] as assured as they are ambitious."

=== Family Business ===
In 1999, Epstein returned to his hometown of Holyoke, Massachusetts, to record the demise of his father's two businesses—a retail furniture store and a low-rent real estate empire. The resulting project assembled large-format photographs, video, archival materials, interviews and writing by Epstein. The book, Family Business, which combined all of these elements, won the 2004 Kraszna-Kraus Best Photography Book of the Year award. In reviewing the book, Nancy Princenthal wrote in Art in America that "his patiently plotted bell curve" of the history of the family business "is worthy of Dreiser".

=== American Power ===
From 2004 to 2009, Epstein investigated energy production and consumption in the United States, photographing in and around various energy production sites. This series, titled American Power, questions the meaning and make-up of power—electrical and political. Epstein made a monograph of the American Power pictures (2009), in which he wrote that he was often stopped by corporate security guards and once interrogated by the FBI for standing on public streets and pointing his camera at energy infrastructure. The large-scale prints from this series have been exhibited worldwide.

In his Art in America review, Dave Coggins wrote that Epstein "grounds his images…in the human condition, combining empathy with sharp social observation, politics with sheer beauty." In an essay for the catalogue Contemporary African Photography from The Walther Collection: Appropriated Landscapes (2011), Brian Wallis wrote,

"Epstein has made clear that his intention is neither to illustrate political events nor to create persuasive propaganda. Rather, he raises the more challenging question of how inherently abstract political concepts about the nation and the culture as a whole can be represented photographically…But equally significant is the unique form of documentary storytelling that he has invented in American Power—colorful, sweeping, concerned, intimate, honest."

In The New York Times, Martha Schwendener wrote:

"What is interesting, beyond the haunting, complicated beauty and precision of these images, is Mr. Epstein's ability to merge what have long been considered opposing terms: photo-conceptualism and so-called documentary photography. He utilizes the supersize scale and saturated color of conceptualism, and his odd, implied narratives strongly recall the work of artists like Jeff Wall."

In 2009, Epstein collaborated with his second wife, author Susan Bell, on a public art project and website based on American Power. The What Is American Power? project used billboards, transportation posters, and a website to "inspire and educate people about environmental issues."

In 2013, the Walker Art Center in Minneapolis commissioned Epstein and cellist Erik Friedlander to create a theatrical performance of American Power, which premiered at the Walker and, in 2015, traveled to the Wexner Center for the Arts in Ohio and The Victoria and Albert Museum in London. Created in collaboration with directors Annie-B Parson and Paul Lazar, this theatrical rendition of Epstein's photographic series combines projected photographs, archival material, video, music, and storytelling.

=== Berlin ===
In 2008, Epstein won the Berlin Prize in Arts and Letters from the American Academy in Berlin. Awarded a 6-month residency, he moved to Berlin with his wife and daughter from January–June 2008. The photographs he made there of significant historical sites were published in the monograph Berlin (2011).

=== New York Arbor and Rocks and Clouds ===
For his New York trilogy, New York Arbor and Rocks and Clouds, Epstein photographed the city's trees, rocks, and clouds with an 8×10 view camera and black and white film to depict the interplay between society and nature. "Epstein's trees extend the photographer's longstanding interest in mankind's disruption of our environment," writes Rob Slifkin, "...his new work typically addresses this theme of human engagement with nature without recourse to the inclusion of actual people. Instead it is the way the human environment clumsily perches itself upon and amidst the natural world that defines Epstein's approach to landscape."

== Recognition and awards ==
- 2002–2003: Guggenheim Fellowship from the John Simon Guggenheim Memorial Foundation
- 2004: Kraszna-Krausz Photography Book Award
- 2008: Guna S. Mundheim Fellow in the Visual Arts, Berlin Prize in Arts and Letters, from the American Academy in Berlin
- 2011: Prix Pictet

== Personal life ==
Epstein's first marriage to director Mira Nair ended in divorce around 1990 or 1991. Epstein experienced "uncomfortable" racial discrimination due to his interracial relationship with Nair.

He has identified his travels in India for his photography work and as part of Nair's various film productions as perspective-shifting. He describes the trips to India as among the most important experiences in his life.

Epstein was a visiting artist and professor in the photography program at Bard College.

== Films ==
- India Cabaret (1985) – Director of photography
- Salaam Bombay! (1988) – production designer
- Mississippi Masala (1992) – production designer
- Dad (2003) – producer and director

== Solo exhibitions ==
- Mitch Epstein: American Power, Henri Cartier-Bresson Foundation, Paris, May–July 2011
- Kunstmuseum Bonn, 2011
- Musée de l'Élysée, Lausanne, 2011
- Open Eye Gallery, Liverpool, November–December 2011

== Collections ==
Epstein's work is held in the following permanent collections:

- Museum of Modern Art, New York
- Whitney Museum of American Art
- J. Paul Getty Museum, Los Angeles
- San Francisco Museum of Modern Art
- Tate Modern, London,

== Publications ==
- In Pursuit of India. New York: Aperture, 1987. ISBN 0-89381-214-5.
- Fire, Water, Wind: Photographs from Tenri. Tenri-shi, Japan: Tenrikyō Dōyūsha, 1996. ISBN 4-8073-0370-8.
- Vietnam: A Book of Changes. New York: Center for Documentary Studies in association with W.W. Norton & Co., 1997. ISBN 0-393-04027-5.
- The City. New York: powerHouse, 2002. ISBN 1-57687-101-0.
- Family Business. Göttingen, Germany: Steidl, 2003. ISBN 3-88243-913-0.
- Recreation: American photographs 1973–1988. Göttingen, Germany: Steidl, 2005. ISBN 3-86521-084-8.
- Work. Göttingen, Germany: Steidl, 2006. ISBN 3-86521-281-6.
- American Power. Göttingen, Germany: Steidl, 2009. ISBN 978-3-86521-924-4.
- Berlin. Göttingen, Germany: Steidl & The American Academy in Berlin, 2011. ISBN 978-3-86930-224-9.
- New York Arbor. Göttingen, Germany: Steidl, 2013. ISBN 978-3-86930-581-3
- Rocks and Clouds. Göttingen, Germany: Steidl, 2018. ISBN 978-3-95829-160-7
- Sunshine Hotel. Göttingen, Germany: Steidl/PPP 2019. ISBN 978-3-95829-609-1
- Property Rights. Göttingen, Germany: Steidl 2021. ISBN 978-3-95829-901-6
- In India. Göttingen, Germany: Steidl 2021. ISBN 978-395829-967-2
