= Susan Bell =

Susan Bell may refer to:

- Susan Bell (bishop) (born 1966), bishop of Niagara
- Susan Bell (curler), winning team member in 1985 Ontario Women's Curling Championship
- Susan Bell (forester), British planner and forester
- Susan Bell (sport shooter)
- Susan Groag Bell (1926–2015), Czech-American pioneer in women's studies

== See also ==
- Susie Bell, 19th-century nautical tune collected by Frederick Augustus Packer
