= Rio Grande (shanty) =

Traditional sea shanty

"Rio Grande" is a nineteenth-century sea shanty, traditionally popular amongst American and British crews. Some people believe the title refers to the Rio Grande river, which forms much of the border between Mexico and the United States; but the shanty talks about the Brazilian state Rio Grande do Sul and its chief port of the same name. Like many other shanties, there are a variety of different lyrics. It was included in the 1894 work Studies in Folk-Song and Popular Poetry by Alfred Williams.
