= Downton pump =

Type of positive displacement pump

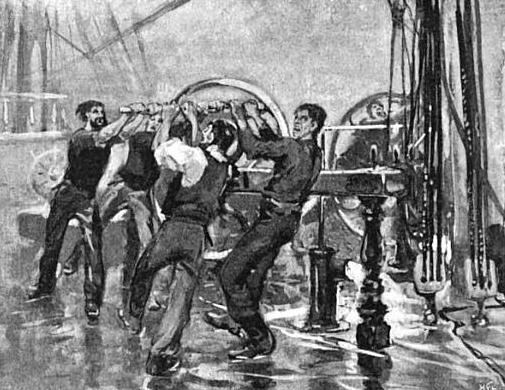
Downton pump operated by sailors

The Downton pump is type of positive displacement pump patented in 1825 by Jonathan Downton, a British shipwright. It was typically used on ships.

The design of the Downton pump sought to create a more constant flow of pumped liquid, and a steadier load-state on the pump, by increasing the number of buckets operating in the pump. These buckets were actuated by means of a rotating crankshaft and connecting rods, which caused the buckets to reciprocate up and down, with each feeding the next with liquid. Hebert (1836) contains a description and cut-away illustration of an early Downton pump.

== Power source ==
The power source for the pump could be either mechanical or human, with human-powered Downton pumps being operated by means of a capstan.
