= Susie Bell =

Australian nautical tune

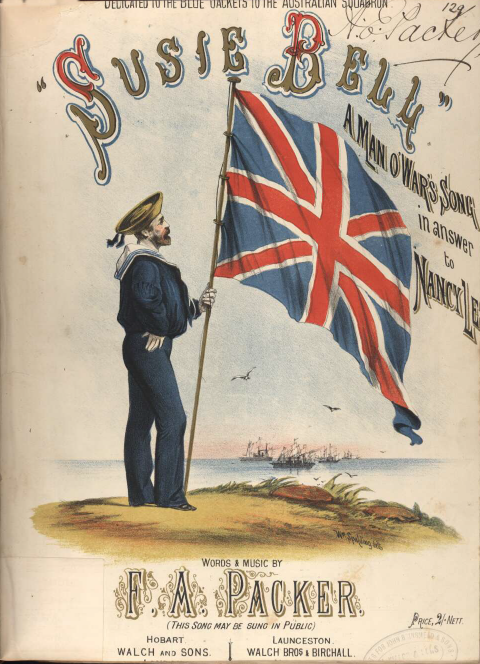

Song
- Published: 1882
- Genre: Nautical folk

Audio sample
- Collected by Frederick Augustus Packer: file; help

Susie Bell was a popular nineteenth century nautical tune collected by Frederick Augustus Packer around the port at Hobart, in Tasmania. First published in 1882 London. The song is dedicated to the blue jacket sailors of the Australian Squadron, stationed in Australia. The lyrics are a rollicking Australian response to Nancy Lee written by Stephen Adams

== Lyrics ==
Jack may blow of his Nancy Lee, how fair and sweet her face is,
But Susie Bell is the girl for me, with all her matchless graces,
She looks so sly with her laughing eye and rigs so trim and neat boys,
There ain't no boat as I knows afloat can match her charms and graces.

CHORUS
Sing Ho! below, yo ho heave ho so trim and taut my girl is
Away we go through the wind and snow And the pride of the fleet our ship is
And my sweetheart Sue I am true to you As the needle to the pole is
Singing Yo Heave Ho and a long loud cheer together
Let the wild winds blow What care we for the weather

Oh it's many a day since we sailed away at four o'clock in the morning
with our close reefed sail we faced the gale and fear and danger scorning
And as off we flew Ne'er a man in the crew more felt his heart a sinking
For I know'd as Sue as 'true as true' of me when I was thinking

CHORUS

so here's a glass for the prettiest lass who 'good as golden gold' is
and may Nancy Lee as faithful be as my own darling Sue is
and when we're spliced by the parsons knot may we have joy together
and fair or foul may blow the wind we'll face all sort of weather

CHORUS

== Performances ==
- 1883 Hobart
- 1885 Hobart
- 1886 Tasmania
- 1894 Melbourne, Victoria
- 1894 Launceston
- 1901 Bunbury, Western Australia
- 1906 Tasmania
- 1907 Tasmania
- 1930 Hobart
- 1936 Hobart
