= Wilkins (surname) =

Origin
- Meaning: son of "William"
- Region of origin: England and Wales

Other names
- Variant forms: Wilkens, Wilkinson, Wilkin

Wilkins is a surname.

== People of note with the surname Wilkins ==
- Given names A–C:
  - Abbie E. Krebs-Wilkins (1842–1924), American businesswoman
  - Alan Wilkins, Welsh cricketer
  - Alan Wilkins, Scottish playwright
  - Andy Jones-Wilkins, American ultrarunner
  - Ann Wilkins (1806–1857), American missionary teacher
  - Arnold Frederic Wilkins (1907–1985), radar pioneer
  - Barry Wilkins, Canadian ice hockey player
  - Beriah Wilkins (1846–1905), American politician
  - Billy Wilkins, American musician and teacher
  - Bob Wilkins (1932–2009), American TV personality
  - Bobby-Gaye Wilkins, Jamaican Olympic athlete
  - Brooke Wilkins, Australian softball player
  - Bray Wilkins, founder of Middleton, Massachusetts and figure in the execution of John Willard and others during the Salem Witch Trials
  - Carolyn A. Wilkins, Canadian economist
  - Carolyn F. Wilkins (born 1945), Australian botanist
  - Charles Wilkins (1749–1836), English orientalist
  - Charles Wilkins Webber (1819–1856), American journalist and explorer
  - Chris Wilkins (1944–2018), South African cricketer
  - Christian Wilkins (born 1995), American football player
  - Christian Wilkins (born 1995), Australian model
  - Clive Wilkins, British artist
  - Connie Wilkins, American author
- Given names D–G:
  - Damien Wilkins, American basketball player
  - Dave Wilkins (1914–1990), Barbadian musician
  - David H. Wilkins, American ambassador to Canada
  - David Wilkins, Irish Olympic sailor
  - David Wilkins (orientalist) (1685–1745), Prussian orientalist
  - Dean Wilkins, English football player and manager
  - Dominique Wilkins, American basketball player
  - Donna Wilkins, New Zealand netball player
  - Eddie Lee Wilkins, American basketball player
  - Eddie Wilkins, rugby league footballer of the 1960s
  - Edwin Wilkins Field (1804–1871), English lawyer and painter
  - Eric Wilkins, American baseball player
  - Ernie Wilkins (1922–1999), American musician
  - Esther Wilkins, American dentist and dental educator
  - Francis Wilkins (1864–1908), US-born Canadian politician
  - Fraser Wilkins (1908–1989), United States diplomat
  - Gabe Wilkins, American football player
  - George Wilkins, English dramatist (17th century)
  - George Wilkins, English football player and father of footballers Dean, Graham and Ray Wilkins
  - Sir George Hubert Wilkins (1888–1958), Australian polar explorer
  - Gerald Wilkins, American basketball player in the NBA
  - Gina Ferris Wilkins, American author
  - Glover Wilkins, American Tennessee-Tombigbee Waterway administrator
  - Graham Wilkins, English football player
- Given names H–L:
  - Harold T. Wilkins (1891–1960), British journalist
  - Henry Wilkins III (1930–1991), American politician from Arkansas
  - Henry Wilkins IV (born 1954), American politician and judge from Arkansas
  - Herve D. Wilkins (1843–1913), American organist and composer
  - Hubert Wilkins (1888–1958), Australian polar explorer, ornithologist, geographer and photographer
  - Hugh Percy Wilkins (1896–1960), Welsh engineer
  - Isaac Wilkins (1743–1830), Jamaican-born Canadian political figure
  - Isaiah Wilkins (born 1995), American basketball player and coach
  - J. Ernest Wilkins, Jr. (1923–2011), American nuclear scientist, engineer and mathematician
  - J. Ernest Wilkins, Sr. (1894–1959), American lawyer and labor leader
  - J. Steven Wilkins, American author and pastor
  - Jack Wilkins, American musician
  - Jacques Wilkins, Canadian political figure
  - Jeff Wilkins, American football player
  - Jeff Wilkins, American basketball player
  - Jheanelle Wilkins (born 1988), American politician
  - Joe Willie Wilkins (1921 or 1923–1979), American Memphis blues guitarist, singer and songwriter
  - John Wilkins (1614–1672), English Bishop
  - John Wilkins, American football coach
  - John Wilkins, Moroccan basketball player
  - John Wilkins Whitfield (1818–1879), American military general
  - Jody Wilkins, English Musician
  - Jordan Wilkins, American football player
  - Josetta Wilkins (1932–2023), Arkansas legislator
  - Kath Wilkins, English cricketer
  - Katie Wilkins, American volleyball player
  - Kim Wilkins, Australian author
  - Kitty Wilkins (1857–1936), American horse breeder
  - Laisha Wilkins, Mexican actress and talk show host
  - Len Wilkins (1925–2003), British footballer
  - Louis Wilkins (1882–1950), American Olympic athlete
- Given names M:
  - Malcolm Maurice "Mac" Wilkins, American athlete
  - Manny Wilkins (born 1995), American football player
  - Marc Wilkins, American baseball player
  - Marc Wilkins, Australian scientist
  - Marcus Wilkins, American football player
  - Mark Wilkins (racing driver), Canadian racing driver
  - Martin Isaac Wilkins (1804–1881), Canadian lawyer and politician
  - Mary Eleanor Wilkins Freeman (1852–1930), American author
  - Maurice Wilkins (1916–2004), British physicist, molecular biologist, and Nobel Laureate
  - Mazzi Wilkins (born 1995), American football player
  - Michael J. Wilkins, Utah State Supreme Court Justice
  - Morris Wilkins (1925–2015), inventor of the heart-shaped bathtub and champagne glass bathtub
- Given names N–O:
  - Nicole Wilkins (born 1984), American bodybuilder
  - Ormsby Wilkins (1916–1976), Australian radio presenter
- Given names P–R:
  - Peter Wilkins, British artist
  - Philip Charles Wilkins (1913–1998), U.S. Federal judge
  - Ray Wilkins (1956–2018), English football player
  - Raymond H. Wilkins (1917–1943), American military officer
  - Richard Wilkins (footballer), English footballer
  - Richard Wilkins (law), American law professor
  - Richard Wilkins (TV presenter), Australian television presenter
  - Rick Wilkins, Canadian composer, conductor, and jazz musician
  - Rick Wilkins, American baseball player
  - Robert Wallace Wilkins (1906–2003), American medical professional
  - Robert Wilkins (1896–1987), American musician
  - Roger Wilkins (1932–2017), American civil rights leader
  - Roger Wilkins (public servant), Australian public servant
  - Ronald W. T. Wilkins, Australian geochemist and poet
  - Rosalie Wilkins, Baroness Wilkins (1946–2024), British baroness and politician
  - Ross Wilkins (1799–1872), American politician
  - Roy Wilkins (1901–1981), American civil rights activist
  - Roy Wilkins, American football player
- Given names S–W:
  - Sharon Wilkins, American actress
  - Squire Wilkins (1924–2012), England international rugby union player
  - Stephen W. Wilkins (1946–2013), Australian physicist
  - Sue Myrick née Wilkins (born 1941), American politician
  - Susie Wilkins, English singer-songwriter, producer and multi-instrumentalist
  - Ted Wilkins, rugby league footballer of the 1950s
  - Terrence Wilkins, American football player
  - Thomas Wilkins (disambiguation)
  - Thomas Russell Wilkins (1891–1940), Canadian physicist
  - Toby Wilkins, British movie director
  - Vance Wilkins, American politician
  - Vaughan Wilkins, English historical novelist
  - Verna Allette Wilkins, author, founder of Tamarind Books
  - Walter Wilkins (1741–1828), English Member of Parliament
  - Walter Wilkins (d. 1840), son of Walter (d. 1828). English Member of Parliament and High Sheriff of Radnorshire. Changed the family name to de Winton in 1839.
  - Wayne Wilkins, British songwriter/producer
  - William A. Wilkins (1899–1987), British politician
  - William J. Wilkins (1897–1995), American judge
  - William Walter Wilkins, American judge
  - William Wilkins (1778–1839), English architect, classical scholar and archaeologist
  - William Wilkins (1779–1865), American politician
  - Winkie Wilkins, American politician

== Fictional ==
- Curtis Wilkins, comic strip character from Curtis
- Debbie Wilkins, soap opera character from EastEnders
- Major Wilkins, character in Under Capricorn
- Mark Wilkins, character in Resident Evil Outbreak
- Peter Wilkins, central character in The Life and Adventures of Peter Wilkins: A Cornish Man by Robert Paltock, Volume I of II), published in 1884
- Richard Wilkins, fictional character in Buffy the Vampire Slayer
- Wendy Wilkins, soap opera character from Search for Tomorrow
- Wilkins Micawber, character from the novel David Copperfield
- Wilkins, villain in the comic Batman#50
- Wilkins, Muppet created by Jim Henson

== See also ==
Wilkin (surname)
