= À Hauteur d'homme =

- Directed by: Jean-Claude Labrecque
- Written by: Jean-Claude Labrecque
- Starring: Bernard Landry
- Release date: November 11, 2003
- Running time: 95 min.
- Country: Canada
- Language: French

À Hauteur d'homme is a 2003 Canadian political documentary directed in 2003 by Jean-Claude Labrecque about Bernard Landry and the 2003 general election in Quebec, Canada. It won a Jutra Award for Best Documentary (tie) in 2004. Its style belongs to the Quebec cinéma direct school of filmmaking.

== Overview ==
À Hauteur d'homme is a political documentary film revolving first around one man, Bernard Landry, leader of the Parti Québécois (PQ), and second around the re-election campaign of his party in 2003. The movie shows an intimate, never-before-seen look at the works of an election campaign. The finality of the story, the defeat of the party, gives this work a mood of tragedy, but with final acceptance. It also features, amongst others, Landry's girlfriend, Chantal Renaud, and press attaché Hubert Bolduc.

Landry, the protagonist, is an independentist, social democrat, Premier of Quebec, fighting for the re-election of the Parti Québécois in the hope of obtaining his life's dream: the independence of Quebec from Canada. His opponents in the election, Jean Charest of the Parti Libéral du Québec (PLQ) and Mario Dumont of the Action démocratique du Québec (ADQ), are rarely seen in the film.

Along with his team, he goes through an intense experience in two periods. The first half of the campaign goes smoothly: Landry is relaxed and confident. After having fought for its very life, the party is popular again and leads the polls. The televised leaders' debate is the turning point. During the debate Charest confronts Landry with a news report purportingly quoting Jacques Parizeau, the former PQ premier, as being unrepentant for his 1995 referendum evening's unfortunate remarks. In the following days, this sparks a controversy that will be known as the Parizeau Affair. From then on, a second period begins. The PQ loses some steam. Charest slowly surpasses Landry in the polls.

Often trapped by insistent, forceful questions by reporters, Landry shares with the team his impression that journalists are unjustly harassing him and the party's campaign. After being, in turn, anxious, angry, and sometimes morose, he accepts the coming ineluctable defeat with serenity, but with much emotion, with the comfort of his loved ones and colleagues.

The documentary features the following politicians: Pauline Marois, André Boisclair and François Legault.

Landry's strategist team consists of: Richard Nadeau, Brigitte Pelletier, Hubert Bolduc, Denis Hardy, Frederic Alberro, Marie-Johanne Nadeau, Nathalie Verger, Pierre Langlois, Éric Côté and Jacques Wilkins.

== Context ==
In 2002, the poll numbers for the Parti Québécois fell sharply. The PQ government had been in power for two mandates and was seen as worn-out by some. An important part of the PQ's support went to the Action Démocratique du Québec and its young leader, Mario Dumont, and some to the Liberal Party of Quebec. It is under this dramatic situation for the PQ followers that Landry underwent a revitalization of the party and its image. The PQ was aided by the fall popularity of the ADQ's ideas as their conservative nature was uncovered, and by social democratic measures taken by the PQ government like the passing of the Act to combat poverty and social exclusion. The Parti Québécois succeeded in gaining back popularity in the beginning of 2003 to take the lead in the public opinion polls again. The PQ felt confident again to take upon a singular task: to become the first Quebec government in more than forty years to win a third mandate.

It is at the time of the downfall of 2002 that Labrecque decided to work on bringing about a movie about the coming election. He stated that, for this election, he believed the PQ had a lot to win if it succeeded, and a lot to lose if it did not: the re-election of the party could bring Quebec to independence, while a loss had the potential of hurting the sovereigntist movement, perhaps halting it for years.

The 2003 Quebec election itself happened over the backdrop of the war in Iraq. The principal battles in that war took place during the first half of the campaign, diverting the attention of the media and the population. Landry became known for his custom of wearing the white ribbon worn by Quebecers in favour of peace. The wearing of this ribbon was soon adopted by the two other main party leaders, Charest and Dumont.

== Production ==
=== General ===
For months, Landry was filmed everywhere he went, up to voting day. The fact that a politician had accepted to be filmed in such privacy impressed many and was therefore seen as an historical feat: few other movies have had such access to a political figure before.

=== Audio ===
These two previously existing (that is to say that they were not created for the movie soundtrack) musical compositions of the soundtrack are the backbone of the musical backdrop of the film. Audio excerpts from Amazon.com.

- Facades by Philip Glass returns in leitmotiv throughout the movie. It was chosen by Labrecque for its repetitive nature, representative of the 2003 political campaign in some ways.
- Fur Alina by Arvo Pärt and its very melancholic ambiance is used in the final scene where Landry conceded defeat and is comforted by the people close to him.

=== Visuals ===
It is rare for such emphasis be placed on attention to visual beauty in a documentary, especially a political one. This has brought much admiration for the work. It can be stated that Labrecque made it a point to show Landry as a human being with often very intimate, tight shots, breaking the standard of the news channel waist shot or talking heads type of clips that politicians are mostly seen through.

== Awards ==
The film was co-winner, with Benoît Pilon's Roger Toupin, épicier variété, of the Jutra Award for Best Documentary Film at the 6th Jutra Awards in 2004.

== See also ==
- Cinema of Quebec
- Cinéma direct
- Culture of Quebec
- List of Quebec movies
- National Question
- Politics of Quebec
- 2003 Quebec general election
- Quebec nationalism
- Quebec sovereigntism
