= Samuel Wilkins =

Samuel Wilkins II (born c. 1673) was an accuser in the Salem witch trials. He was the son of Henry Wilkins, and thus the grandson of Bray Wilkins and nephew of John Wilkins and Margaret Wilkins Knight, two other accusers. He testified against his cousin-in-law, John Willard.
