= Gwenda Wilkin =

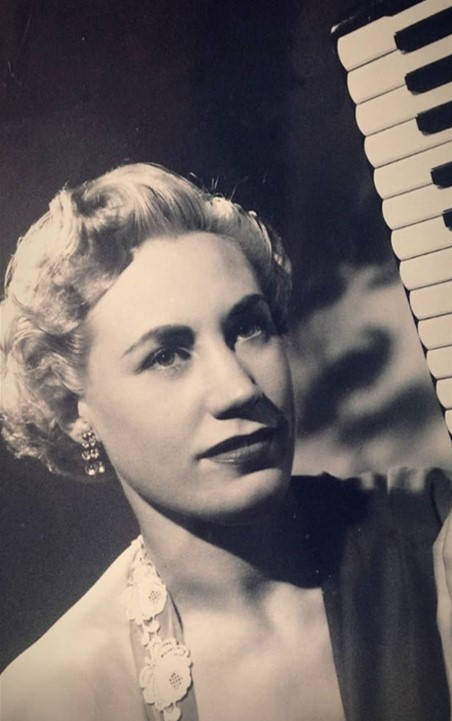

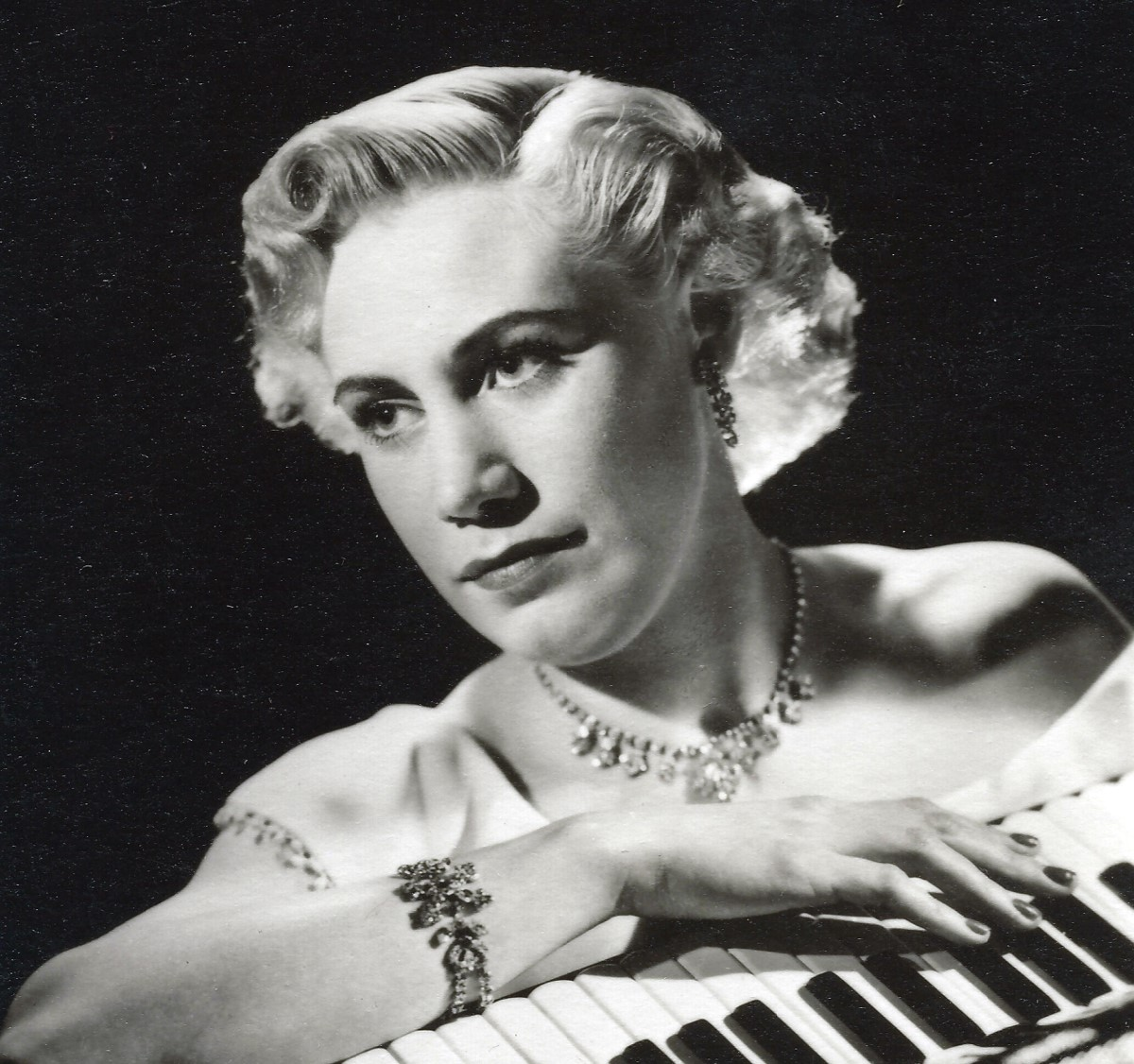
Gwenda Wilkin photographed in 1952 for ENSA programme

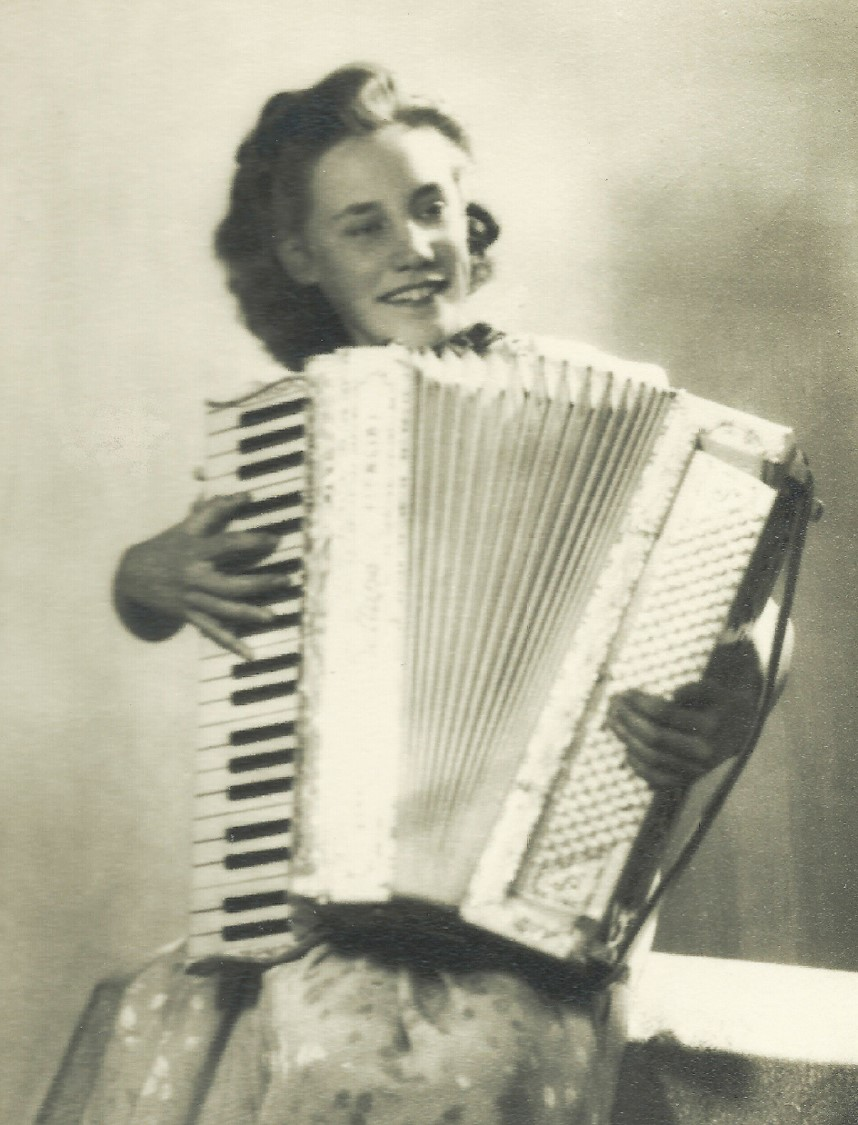
A young Gwenda Wilkin with her first accordion

Gwenda Wilkin (20 May 1933 – 6 May 2020) was a British accordionist. Born in Walthamstow on 20 May 1933, Gwenda was the only child of Frederick Wilkin (1904–1989) and Lillian Gladys Turner (1905–1995). After a visit to the Royal Albert Hall, a very young Gwenda wanted to play the organ so she started piano lessons. At 10 years old she was given an accordion for the first time and it immediately felt familiar to her. Her aptitude for the instrument meant she progressed rapidly in her lessons and she started performing at charity concerts within 3 years. In 1947 she won the British Junior Accordion Championship in St Pancras Town Hall in London. The following year in 1948 she won the British Junior and Open Accordion Championship. In 1949 Gwenda represented Britain in the Accordion World Championship in Spa, Belgium securing an impressive 6th position for her young age. She competed again in 1950 in Milan, Italy and won the bronze medal.

In the summer of 1950 Gwenda rose to stardom playing at venues throughout Britain and in 1952 she was asked to join ENSA (later called the CSE) by Gracie Fields to tour internationally entertaining the British troops. Gwenda spent most of the 1950s touring abroad performing for Troops with Gracie Fields and Vera Lynn who both became lifelong friends. Vic Evans and Chester Harriot accompanied Gwenda throughout her African tour and became her firm friends until their respective deaths, speaking on the telephone every week into old age.

Gwenda appeared on one of the very first episodes of Opportunity Knocks which was first aired by the BBC in 1949. She was regular artist on BBC Radio shows like Have a Go and Workers Playtime, Midday Musical Hall, and Variety Bandbox.

The Royal family noticed Gwenda through her Radio and TV appearances and she become a favourite of the Queen Elizabeth The Queen Mother who often invited her to perform at Clarence House and for the garden parties at Buckingham Palace.

Throughout the 1960s and 1970s Gwenda spent most of her time performing in the UK so she could spend more time with her two young children. She was a supporter of the Not Forgotten Association and the Chelsea Pensioners.

Gwenda retired from show business towards the end of the 1970s due to health problems and returned to school to study veterinary practise and animal husbandry. She qualified in 1985 and practised with local veterinary surgeries until her retirement in 2005. Gwenda died on 6 May 2020 in North Middlesex Hospital from complications following surgery.
