= The Ainsley Harriott Show =

- Genre: Cooking, talk show
- Directed by: Dan Berg
- Presented by: Ainsley Harriott
- Country of origin: United States
- Original language: English

Production
- Producer: John Veroff
- Production companies: Valleycrest Productions, Ltd. Merv Griffin Entertainment; Buena Vista Television

Original release
- Network: Syndicated
- Release: January 10 – September 15, 2000

The Ainsley Harriott Show was the American cooking and talk show debut of Britain television chef Ainsley Harriott.

In 1999, Buena Vista Television established the production crew for The Ainsley Harriott Show which was produced by Valleycrest Productions along with Buena Vista Television and Merv Griffin Entertainment. Joni Holder was brought on as co-executive producer, John Veroff as supervising producer and Dan Berg as director.

The show was syndicated by Buena Vista Television.

Prior to the conception of the show, Harriott was first spotted on the BBC by the future executive producer of The Ainsley Harriot Show, Merv Griffin, who was at the time visiting Ireland.

The show was filmed in New York and guests included professional boxer Evander Holyfield, actor Danny DeVito, Richard Branson, Stefanie Powers and comedian Caroline Rhea.

The show debuted in 2000 and ended later that same year.

== Critical reception ==
The New York Times said in its review "At first glance, The Ainsley Harriott Show looks a little, well, awful. The very British Mr. Harriott wears aggressively bright clothes. He trills operatically, occasionally with the help of the show's house band. He yaks it up with B-television actresses," adding "If you can imagine someone speaking in italics punctuated by exclamation points, you have accurately imagined Ainsley Harriott. Everything's exciting! Everything will be even more exciting! Just you wait and see! He is the kind of guy who bursts into song between recipes, and no one likes him less for it."
