= Wilkin (surname) =

Wilkin is a surname.

== People of note with the surname Wilkin ==
- Abra Prentice Wilkin, American philanthropist
- Alexander Wilkin, American military officer
- Catherine Wilkin, Australian actress
- Garth Wilkin, politician from Saint Kitts and Nevis
- Gwenda Wilkin, British accordionist
- Jacob W. Wilkin, American judge
- Jeremy Wilkin, British actor
- John Wilkin, American librarian
- Jon Wilkin, British rugby player
- Karen Wilkin, American museum curator and art critic
- Marijohn Wilkin, American songwriter
- John Buck Wilkin, American singer-songwriter

== Fictional persons ==
- Bingo Wilkin, character in That Wilkin Boy
- Wilbur Wilkin, character in Wilbur Comics

== See also ==
- Wilkins (surname)
