= Ainsley Harriott =

English chef and television presenter

Ainsley Harriott MBE
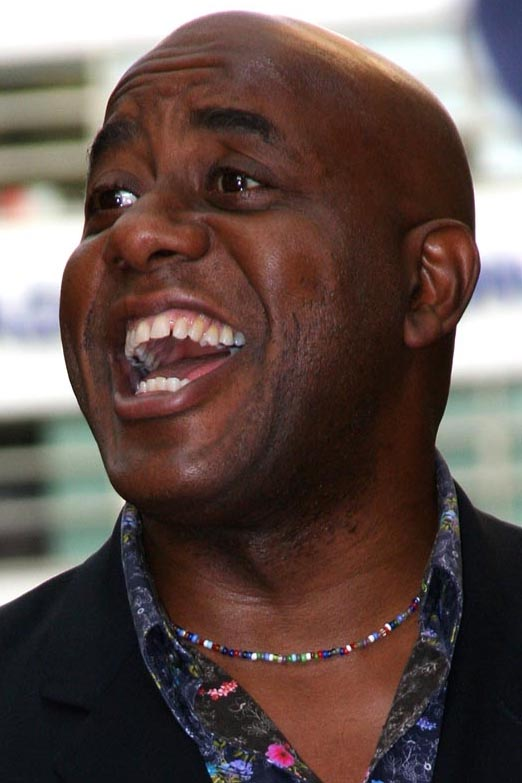
- Harriott in 2007
- Born: Ainsley Denzil Dubriel Harriott; 28 February 1957 (age 69); Paddington, London, England
- Education: Westminster Kingsway College
- Occupations: Chef, television presenter, entertainer
- Years active: 1988–present
- Spouse: Clare Fellows (m. 1989; sep. 2012)
- Children: 2
- Parents: Chester Harriott (father); Peppy Strudwick (mother)
- Culinary career
- Television shows
- Can't Cook, Won't Cook; Ready Steady Cook; Red Dwarf; The Ainsley Harriott Show
- Harriott's voice recorded January 2017
- Website: ainsley-harriott.com

Ainsley Denzil Dubriel Harriott MBE (born 28 February 1957) is an English chef and television presenter. He is known for his BBC cooking game shows Can't Cook, Won't Cook and Ready Steady Cook.

== Early life ==
Harriott was born in Paddington, London, to Peppy (née Strudwick) and pianist and singer Chester Leroy Harriott (1933–2013). He has Jamaican heritage. Harriott attended Wandsworth Comprehensive School then trained at Westminster Kingsway College (formerly Westminster Technical College), and obtained an apprenticeship at Verrey's restaurant in London's West End, later working as a commis chef.

== Career ==
Harriott's talents lie in comedy and singing as well as cooking. He formed the Calypso Twins with school friend Paul Boross, releasing a hit record in the early 1990s, "World Party". The Calypso Twins were regular performers at the Comedy Store and Jongleurs; they also performed in America and on TV and radio shows. Harriott became head chef at the Long Room of Lord's Cricket Ground. He was asked to present More Nosh, Less Dosh on BBC Radio 5 Live, and also has appeared as an extra in Hale and Pace.

=== Television work ===
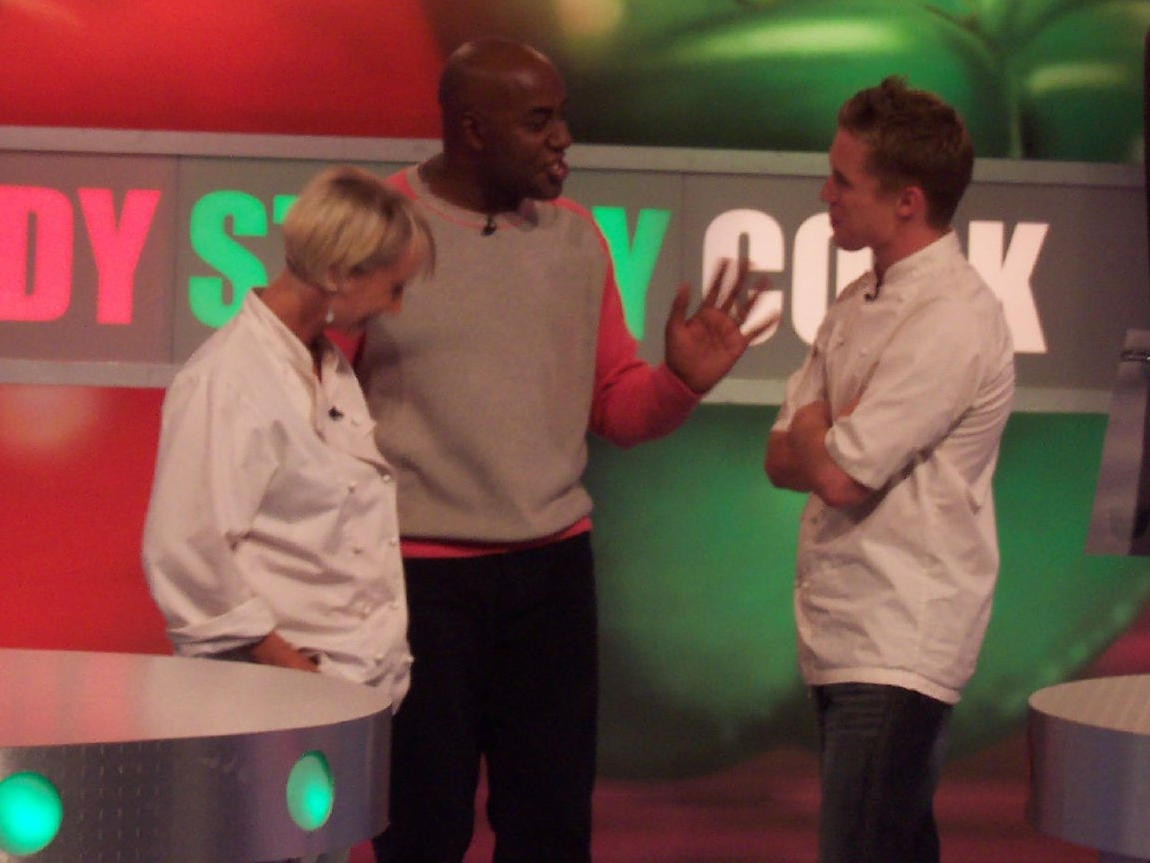
Harriott on the set of Ready Steady Cook, August 2004

Harriott became the resident chef on Good Morning with Anne and Nick and later the main presenter of Can't Cook, Won't Cook and originally a chef on Ready Steady Cook before he went on to host it in 2000, both shows involving members of the public. He has presented more straightforward how-to-cook programmes such as Ainsley's Barbecue Bible, Ainsley's Meals in Minutes, Ainsley's Big Cook Out and Ainsley's Gourmet Express.

Harriott played the part of a GELF chief in the sci-fi comedy series Red Dwarf in 1993. In 1998, for the show's 10th anniversary, Harriott presented a special edition of Can't Cook, Won't Cook called Can't Smeg, Won't Smeg with the cast of the show cooking a meal while remaining in character.

In 2000, Harriott made his debut on United States television with The Ainsley Harriott Show, produced by Merv Griffin Entertainment and syndicated by Buena Vista Television, the series also ended in 2000.

Harriot then went on to host Ready... Set... Cook!, the American version of Ready Steady Cook. Ainsley was guest chef on Something for the Weekend on 10 May 2009 and 21 February 2010 alongside guests JLS. In February 2010, Harriott joined the morning show GMTV with Lorraine featuring cookery recipes. From 2002 until 2007, Harriott appeared in TV adverts for Fairy Liquid.

In September 2008, Harriott took part in the genealogy documentary series Who Do You Think You Are? Harriott knew that his great-grandfather Ebenezer Harriott was in the colonial West India Regiment, and had assumed that they were descended from slaves. In Barbados, he confirmed that his great-grandfather had a distinguished military career, and learnt that he had fought on the side of the British in the Hut Tax War of 1898 – an increasingly violent series of protests against systems of taxation in Sierra Leone. Although Harriott had assumed that his great-great-grandfather, James Gordon Harriott, was a black slave, he was revealed to be the descendant of a long line of white slaveowners.

Harriott appeared in the final My Family Christmas special in 2010 "Mary Christmas". On 11 August 2015, he was announced as the second contestant of the thirteenth series of Strictly Come Dancing. On 5 September 2015 it was revealed Harriott was paired with professional dancer Natalie Lowe for the thirteenth series. He was the fourth contestant to be voted off and finished twelfth.

Harriott was appointed Member of the Order of the British Empire (MBE) in the 2020 New Year Honours for services to broadcasting and the culinary arts.

=== Writing ===
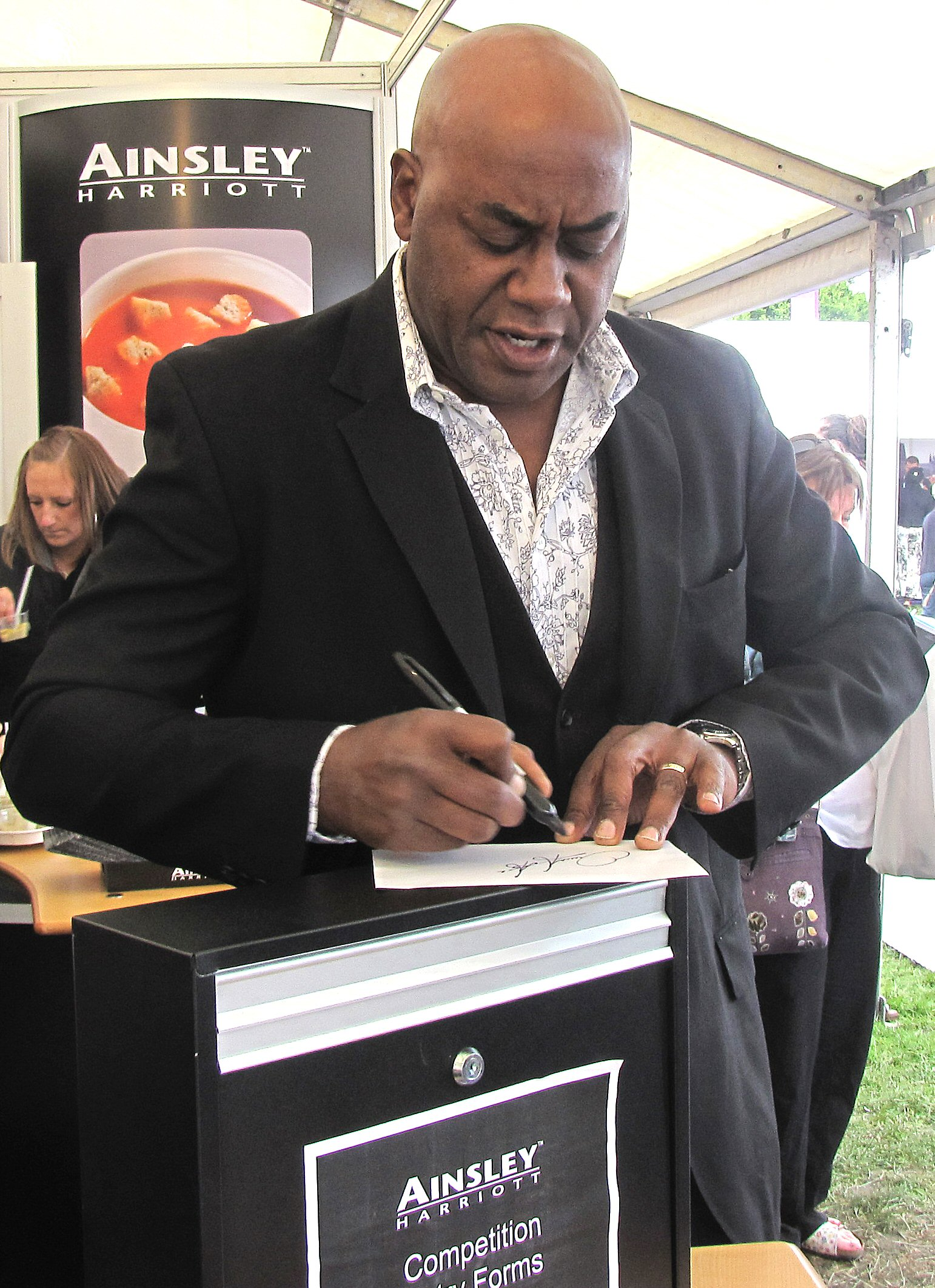
Harriott at the Taste of London, June 2010

Harriott is a best-selling author, publishing twelve books as well as numerous others in conjunction with his television shows. Including foreign-language translations, he has sold over 2 million books worldwide.

=== Other work ===
Harriott was the President of the Television and Radio Industries Club (TRIC) 2004–05 and presented their awards ceremony that year. He markets his own range of food, including couscous, risotto, soups and cereal bars.

He made a guest appearance in the BBC radio comedy series Giles Wemmbley Hogg Goes Off as himself in 2006.

Harriott played the role of the Narrator in The Rocky Horror Show at the New Theatre in Cardiff, Wales in March 2010, at the Churchill Theatre in Bromley, London in October 2010, and again at the Richmond Theatre in November 2010.

In 2022 Harriot, along with others including the DIY SOS presenter Nick Knowles, helped to save his sister Jacqueline from drowning after she fell into a water feature at the Chelsea Flower Show.

In December 2023 Harriot won the Christmas special of The Masked Singer as Partridge (in a Pear Tree).

== Personal life ==
Harriott married former costume designer Clare Fellows, the youngest sister of comedian and actor Graham Fellows. They have two children. In November 2012, the couple were reported to have separated and they remain on good terms.

Harriott is a supporter of Arsenal F.C.

== Filmography ==
Year(s)	Title	Role
1988	Hale & Pace	Extra
1990–1991	Davro	Extra
1992–1996	Good Morning with Anne and Nick	Resident chef
1993	Red Dwarf	GELF Chief
1994–2010	Ready Steady Cook	Chef / presenter
1995–2000	Can't Cook, Won't Cook	Presenter
1997	Ainsley's Barbecue Bible	Presenter
1998	Ainsley's Meals in Minutes	Presenter
1999	Ainsley's Big Cook Out	Presenter
2000–2001	Gourmet Express	Presenter
2000–2001	Ready.. Set... Cook!	Presenter
2000	The Ainsley Harriott Show	Presenter
2003	The Mark Steel Lectures	Robert Boyle
2005–2007	City Hospital	Presenter
2010, 2017	Lorraine	Guest chef
2013	Great British Food Revival	Presenter
2014	Ainsley Eats the Streets	Presenter
2015	Ainsley Harriott's Street Food	Presenter
2015	Strictly Come Dancing	Contestant; 12th place
2015	Len and Ainsley's Big Food Adventure	Presenter, with Len Goodman
2016	The Best Dishes Ever	Narrator
2017	Holding Back the Years	Himself
2018	Costa Del Celebrity	Main role
2018	My World Kitchen	Narrator
2019	Ainsley's Caribbean Kitchen	Presenter
2019	Ainsley's Market Menu	Presenter
2020	Ainsley’s Mediterranean Cookbook	Presenter
2020	Ainsley's Food We Love	Presenter
2020	Ainsley's Festive Food We Love	Presenter
2020	Michael McIntyre's The Wheel	Himself
2021, 2022	Ainsley's Good Mood Food	Presenter
2021	Ainsley’s Christmas Good Mood Food	Presenter
2022	Best of British By the Sea	Co-presenter, with Grace Dent
2022	Ainsley's World Cup Flavours	Presenter
2023	Ainsley's Fantastic Flavours	Presenter
2023	Ainsley's Coronation Kitchen	Presenter
2023	The Masked Singer	Contestant / Partridge (in a Pear Tree)
2024	Ainsley's Taste of Malta	Presenter
2024	Ainsley’s National Trust Cook Off	Presenter
2026	Ainsley's Taste of The Bahamas	Presenter

== Bibliography ==
- 1999 Ainsley Harriott's Meals In Minutes (ISBN 0-563-55166-6)
- 2000 Ainsley Harriott's Barbecue Bible (ISBN 0-563-55181-X)
- 2002 Ainsley Harriott's Low-fat Meals In Minutes (ISBN 0-563-53480-X)
- 2002 Ainsley Harriott's Gourmet Express (ISBN 0-563-48826-3)
- 2003 Ainsley Harriott's All New Meals In Minutes (ISBN 0-563-48750-X)
- 2003 Ainsley Harriott's Gourmet Express 2 (ISBN 0-563-48860-3)
- 2003 The Top 100 Recipes from Ready Steady Cook (ISBN 0-563-48729-1)
- 2004 Ainsley Harriott's Friends and Family Cookbook (ISBN 0-563-48756-9)
- 2005 Ainsley's Ultimate Barbecue Bible (ISBN 0-563-52217-8)
- 2006 Ainsley Harriott's All New Meals In Minutes (ISBN 0-563-49321-6)
- 2006 Ainsley Harriott's Feel Good Cookbook (ISBN 0-563-49352-6)
- 2008 Ainsley Harriott's Fresh and Fabulous Meals in Minutes (ISBN 1-84607-444-4)
- 2009 Just Five Ingredients (ISBN 9780563539247)
- 2011 My Kitchen Table: 100 Meals in Minutes (ISBN 1849901503)
- 2012 My Kitchen Table: 100 Great Chicken Recipes (ISBN 1849903972)
- 2019 Ainsley's Caribbean Kitchen (ISBN 9781529104257)
- 2020 Ainsley’s Mediterranean Cookbook (ISBN 9781529104677)
- 2021 Ainsley’s Good Mood Food (ISBN 978-1529148312)
