= Kevin McCarthy (director) =

American television director

Kevin McCarthy is an American television director.

== Career ==
He is best known as the director of the syndicated game show Jeopardy!, and before that, he served as the show's associate director from the start in 1984 until taking the main director position in 1992 (replacing Dick Schneider), a role in which he held for 26 years until the end of the 2017–18 season, when he announced his retirement on June 26, 2018. He was replaced by Clay Jacobsen. He also directed Jeopardy!'s spin-off programs Rock & Roll Jeopardy! on VH1 and Sports Jeopardy! on Crackle, and co-directed another Merv Griffin-created game show, Click.

== Awards ==
McCarthy has been nominated 21 times for Jeopardy! in the Daytime Emmy Award for Outstanding Game/Audience Participation Show, and won the award 8 times.
