= Thomas Wilkinson =

Thomas Wilkinson may refer to:

== Clergy ==
- Thomas Wilkinson (bishop of Brandon) (fl. 1929–1975), Anglican bishop in Canada
- Thomas Wilkinson (bishop of Hexham and Newcastle) (1825–1909), English prelate of the Roman Catholic Church
- Thomas Edward Wilkinson or Edward Wilkinson (1837–1914), Anglican bishop in Africa and Europe

== Victoria Cross recipients ==
- Thomas Wilkinson (VC 1855) (1831–1887), during the Crimean War
- Thomas Wilkinson (VC 1942) (1898–1942), during the Second World War
- Thomas Orde Lawder Wilkinson (1894–1916), during the First World War

== Others ==
- Thomas Wilkinson (Australian politician) (1799–1881), member of the Victorian Legislative Council, 1851–1853
- Thomas Wilkinson (MP) (fl. 1512–1523), British Member of Parliament for Kingston upon Hull
- Thomas Wilkinson (pirate), pirate convicted in Philadelphia, Pennsylvania in 1781
- Thomas Wilkinson (sculptor) (1875–1950), British sculptor
- Thomas Wilkinson, former guitarist of the American death metal band Immolation (band)
- Tom Wilkinson (1948–2023), British actor
- Tom Wilkinson (Canadian football) (born 1943), quarterback
- Tom Wilkinson (footballer), English former footballer

== See also ==
- Thomas Wilkins (disambiguation)
