= Thomas Wilkins =

Thomas Wilkins may refer to:

- Thomas Wilkins (antiquarian) (1625/26–1699), Welsh cleric and antiquarian who collected Welsh manuscripts
- Thomas Wilkins (conductor) (born c. 1956), American orchestra conductor
- Thomas Russell Wilkins (1891–1940), Canadian physicist

== See also ==
- Tom Wilkens (born 1975), American swimmer
- Thomas Wilkinson (disambiguation)
