= Rock & Roll Jeopardy! =

American television game show

- Genre: Game show
- Created by: Scott Sternberg
- Based on: Jeopardy! by Merv Griffin
- Directed by: Kevin McCarthy
- Presented by: Jeff Probst
- Narrated by: Loretta Fox; Stew Herrera
- Theme music composer: Steve Kaplan
- Country of origin: United States
- Original language: English
- No. of seasons: 4
- No. of episodes: 100

Production
- Executive producer: Harry Friedman
- Producers: Lisa Finneran; Gary Johnson
- Running time: approx. 22 minutes
- Production companies: Trackdown Productions; VH1; Columbia TriStar Television

Original release
- Network: VH1
- Release: August 8, 1998 – December 2001

Rock & Roll Jeopardy! is an American television game show created by Scott Sternberg and adapted from the quiz show Jeopardy!. The show debuted on VH1 on August 8, 1998 and ran for four seasons, ending in December 2001. The series also aired in Canada on MuchMoreMusic with reruns airing until 2004. Hosted by Jeff Probst, this version featured largely identical play to the parent program, but highlighted post-1950s popular music trivia rather than focusing on general knowledge. Loretta Fox was the show's original announcer, with Stew Herrera later replacing her.

== Format ==
Instead of the actual amount won during the three rounds of game play, the champions on Rock & Roll Jeopardy! were awarded $5,000, regardless of their score, and non-winners received consolation prizes, which were $2,000 for the second-place contestant and $1,000 for the third-place contestant (like the parent series). For the first two seasons, the clue values were in points, as in Super Jeopardy!, but they were changed to dollars for the final two seasons with the guaranteed minimum for the winner being $5,000. Numerous rock musicians appeared in celebrity editions of the show, playing for charitable organizations of their choice.

As was the case with Jeopardy!, Rock & Roll Jeopardy!'s production involved most of the daily syndicated Jeopardy!'s then-current personnel, and its copyright holder was identified in show credits as Trackdown Productions, Inc. Again, the show was taped at Stage 11 of Sony Pictures Studios, rather than Stage 10. Years after the cancellation, the parent program began to use Rock & Roll Jeopardy!'s main theme and think music (electric-guitar renditions of "Think!" written and performed by Steve Kaplan) in its Kids Weeks, Teen Tournaments and the College Championships (the closing sequence retained the original theme). In Series 36, for the College Championship, it was replaced with Sports Jeopardy! cues. (The College Championship used an entirely new theme from Bleeding Fingers Music in Series 38.)
