= Click (game show) =

- Genre: Game show
- Created by: Merv Griffin
- Directed by: Kevin McCarthy (1997–1998); Bob Hersh (1998–1999)
- Presented by: Ryan Seacrest
- Announcer: Amber Bonasso; Amber Willenborg
- Theme music composer: Steve Lindsey
- Country of origin: United States
- No. of seasons: 2

Production
- Producer: John Lauderdale
- Production locations: The Production Group Studios; Los Angeles, California (season 1); Jonas Jensen Studios; Seattle, Washington (season 2)
- Running time: approx. 22–26 minutes
- Production companies: Merv Griffin Entertainment; Kelly News & Entertainment

Original release
- Network: Syndication
- Release: September 6, 1997 – January 30, 1999

Click is an American television game show based around computers and the then-relatively novel medium of the Internet. The youth-oriented series was created by Merv Griffin and hosted by Ryan Seacrest, with a female co-host who also served as announcer: Amber Bonasso in season 1, and Amber Willenborg in season 2.

It aired in syndication from September 6, 1997 to January 30, 1999, and reruns aired for several years thereafter on Game Show Network. This was the final new game show that Griffin created to premiere during his lifetime.

== Gameplay ==
Three teams (green, red, and yellow) of two teenagers played three rounds, referred on air as "Levels", where the aim was to answer questions worth varying amounts of money.

In each level, the contestants stood at podiums facing a large video wall (which acts as a computer), each screen of that wall had an icon with a symbol representing a category on it. A flashing cursor bounces around the board and stops when someone "clicks the mouse" (pushing down a large red button in the center of the podium at the central station) A question is then read, and teams earned cash for correct answers.

Two main categories (called "Stations") were featured in the first season; regular knowledge categories were answered at "The Motherboard", the station where teams played the game. The Hard Drive station was added in Season Two and was where the regular knowledge categories were answered. "The Motherboard" was only used for clicking the mouse on one of the three stations.

=== Website ===
Possible topics included:

- E-Mail—identifying a famous person who wrote a fictional e-mail. Moved to Chat Room for season 2.
- Click Pix—A picture clue was given for a question.
- Click Video—A video clue was given to the question.
- Sound Bytes—Audio clues were used for questions.
- Home Page—Identifying a topic from a series of clues, grouped into a "home page" format. Added during the second season.

=== Word Wizard/Chat Room ===
Topics included:

- Spell Check choosing the correct spelling among a choice of three, during season 2 this was changed to searching for a misspelled word in a sentence.
- Dictionary—Choosing the answer that best fits the definition of a given word, among a choice of three. The Dictionary was moved to the Hard Drive in season 2 and had four choices.
- Funetics—Identifying license plate-type puzzles, or a word spelled phonetically. Used in season 1 only.
- Instant Message—Identifying who is online, via a fictional instant message. Also added during the second season.

=== Hard Drive (season 2 only) ===
Topics included:

- Health
- Science
- Landmarks
- Language
- Literature
- Food
- Nature
- Politics
- Headlines
- College
- Music
- Math
- Animals
- U.S. History
- World History
- Dictionary
- TV and Film
- Religion
- Culture
- Geography
- Sports

Note: These general knowledge categories were asked at the motherboard during the first season.

== Rounds ==
=== Level One ===
Each team takes turns facing the computer. They each have 60 (originally 90) seconds to answer as many questions as possible. The value of the questions are $25, $50, $75 or $100. One icon on the board is called "Double Click", where the team can double their current score with a correct answer. A team earned $100 if they had no money after a Double Click answer.

During the second season, regular questions were no longer at the motherboard; instead, they were now at another station called "Hard Drive". One player stood at the motherboard clicking while his/her partner ran to one of the three stations. Also, the "Word Wizard" was renamed the "Chat Room". The "Web Site" stayed the same. If the first player missed the question their partner at the motherboard had a chance to answer the question.

=== Level Two ===
Starting with the lowest-scoring team, each team keeps control of the mouse as long as they answer questions correctly. If there was a tie for second place after level one, there was a coin flip during the commercial break and the winner of the coin flip gets to start. If at any time they miss a question, the opposing teams at the main podiums can buzz in and steal control. Landing on a "Virus" ("Crash" in the second season) meant a question was asked to the teams at the podiums for control. If neither team answered correctly, the first team kept control. Question values are still worth anywhere from $25–$100.

=== Level Three—Speed Round ===
Host Seacrest now controlled the mouse, because all three teams had a chance to play every question. In season 2, Seacrest had his back to the board while controlling the mouse. One member of each team stood at a different station while their partners remained at the podiums. After the station was chosen, the player at the appropriate place would hear the question and have a chance to answer for $100. A wrong answer meant that the players at the podiums would have a chance to buzz in and take the money.

After several questions, an off-stage prerecorded voice yelled, "SWITCH! SWITCH! SWITCH!" Then the players swapped places with their teammates and more questions were asked. When time is up in Level 3, the top-scoring team won the game and advanced to the Bonus Level. All three teams kept their money. The losing teams also received consolation prizes.

In case of a tie for first place, or a three-way tie at the end, one final question was asked, and the team who buzzed in with a correct answer moved on to the Bonus Level.

=== Bonus Level ===
In the Bonus Level, the winning team attempted to answer three questions within the time limit to win a pair of computers. In the first season, the team had 45 seconds to answer any three correct questions to win the grand prize. Each correct answer was worth a prize. In season 2, the team had 60 seconds, but the three correct answers had to be given consecutively to win the computers otherwise they get a consolation prize. Each correct answer in the second season Bonus Level was worth $100 win or lose (regardless of whether or not they were consecutive).
