= It's Worth What? =

- Created by: Roy Bank; Lara Spencer
- Presented by: Cedric the Entertainer
- Composer: Jingle Punks
- Country of origin: United States
- No. of seasons: 1
- No. of episodes: 9

Production
- Executive producers: Roy Bank; Lara Spencer; Barry Poznick; John Stevens; Cedric the Entertainer; Ron Ward
- Running time: 42–44 minutes
- Production companies: Merv Griffin Entertainment; Zoo Productions

Original release
- Network: NBC
- Release: July 19 – September 13, 2011

It's Worth What? is an American television game show that debuted July 19, 2011, on NBC. Hosted by Cedric the Entertainer, the show's primary focus is the cost and value of items. Announcer Dave Mitchell would describe each item that appears on stage. Occasionally on each show, resident licensed appraiser Stuart Whitehurst gives additional information about why an item was worth that much.

The series was originally intended to air from July 12, 2011, but this was later changed to July 19.

On May 13, 2012, it was announced that It's Worth What? would not be renewed for a second season.

== Gameplay ==
Season One Episodes
Round	Value (Episodes 1, 6, 9)	Value (Episodes 2-5, 7, 8)
1	$5,000	$5,000
2	$5,000	$5,000
3	$10,000	$15,000
4	$10,000	$15,000
5	$20,000	$30,000
6	$20,000	$30,000
7	$30,000	up to 10x Team Bank (see Final Round)
8	up to 10x Team Bank (see Final Round)	--

Two contestants work together as a team to "discern" the prices of antique items, either appraised value or sale price at auction. Eight Rounds were originally played; however, seven rounds were played in later taped episodes. Winning each round added a specified dollar value into the team’s bank. However, the game continues regardless of winning or losing each round. The team can earn up to US$1 million for a perfectly played game.

=== Round 1 ===
- What's Worth More?: Two separate collectable items are shown and described to the team; both players must then decide, as a team, which one of the items is worth more than the other. After the team has made their decision, Cedric asks if they are sure of their decision. If yes, then Cedric asks if the team is “sure, sure” to lock in their decision. If not, the team can then change their minds. The correct values are then revealed, one item or all items at a time, to determine if the team would “Bank it or Bust it”.

=== Rounds 2 through 6/7 ===
These rounds feature an array of different mini-games which are played in both random order and a similar manner to round one. Among the games played are:

- Truth Be Sold: A collectable item worth a specific amount is shown. Cedric gives two possible stories about why the item is worth that much money: one is true and the other is made up. The team must decide which of those stories is true to win the round.
- Are You Buying It?: Cedric, wearing white gloves, brings three collectable items of various sizes out of an old Traveling Salesman’s suitcase. The case has a false bottom from which items are brought up and through from the display case underneath. Cedric describes each item trying to “sell” it to the team as the most expensive of the three. The team must decide which item of the three is either the most expensive or worth more than a specified amount in order to win.
- Property Line: Cedric gives an exact dollar value as the property line. Then he shows three valuable properties to the team on a video wall that looks like a billboard saying “Cedric the Realtor: I’ll Entertain Any Offer”; one whose value is the exact amount of the property line, one whose value is more than the property line, and one whose value is less than the property line, along with a story about why that property is worth that much money. The team must then place each property in their correct order: above, below, or exactly on the property line. In order to win, all three properties must be in their correct order. After all three properties have been placed; the team is then given the opportunity to make changes before locking in the properties.

Sometimes, the properties are presented in theme editions like:
- The "Vacation" Edition: with vacation rentals the team must put in order of rent per day
- The “I love New York” Edition: with homes located in New York State
- The "Unusual Homes" Edition: with homes built out of commercial and non-traditional buildings
- The “Gone Hollywood” Edition: with homes that were featured in the movies & TV shows
- The “Celebrity” Edition: with mansions owned by celebrities

- Out of the Closet: An avatar of Cedric in his/her underwear, a.k.a. "Cedric the Supermodel", is shown on the video screen. The object is to dress the avatar in the most expensive outfit possible. Three sets of collectable/fashionable clothing are then brought out one set at a time. Each set contains two different articles of clothing (pairs of shoes, dresses, hats, etc.). Each time, the team must select the article of clothing that is more expensive than the other one, which is then placed on the avatar. Once the outfit has been locked in, another avatar is brought out wearing the clothing that was not picked. This represents the “house”. The values of each article of clothing on both avatars are revealed one set at a time. To win the round the value of each item of clothing in the team’s outfit must be more than the value of the similar item of clothing in the house’s outfit. All three items must be correct in order to win.
- Time is Money: Three collectable items from three different centuries are brought out and described. The team must decide which one of the items is the most valuable to win the round.
- Celebrity Inflation: Three ordinary items are brought out and described. Each item was sold at auction for a ridiculously high amount due to the item having reportedly been owned at one time by a celebrity. Also, three celebrity impersonators are brought out representing the celebrity who reportedly owned one of the items. The team must match each item with its celebrity owner, one owner per item, by placing a card with the item name and auction sale price in the celebrity’s hands. After all three items have been paired; the team is then given the opportunity to make changes before locking in the pairs. To win the round, all three items must be correctly matched with their corresponding celebrity.
- Sticker Shock: One collectable item is brought out and described. The team is then shown two dollar values; only one is the actual appraised value of that item. Choosing the correct value wins the round.
- Who Buys That?: Three outrageous luxury items are brought out and described. The team must decide which one of the items is the most expensive to win the round.
- Appreciate Me: One collectable item is brought out and described that has appreciated in value since it was first made in a specified time period. The team is then shown three or four dollar values; only one is the current appraised value of the item. Choosing the correct value wins the round.
- Nice Pair: Two collectable items are brought out and described. The team is then shown three or four dollar values; only one is the actual combined value of both items. Choosing the correct value wins the round.
- Money Doesn’t Grow On Trees: Three collectable items from the ultimate millionaire back yard are brought out and described. The team must decide which one of the items is the most expensive to win the round.
- Better with Age: One collectable item is brought out and described. Also, the amount the item cost when it was new was revealed. The team must decide whether the item is worth more when it was new or worth more now to win the round.
- Billionaire Toys Club: The team is shown three different extreme “Big Boy” toys on the video wall. It is up to the team to put pictures of all three items in order of value from least expensive on the left to most expensive on the right. After all three items have been placed; the team is then given the opportunity to make changes before locking in the order. All three items must be in the correct order to win the round.
- Sweet-Art Deal: Three classic paintings are brought out and described with the names of the painters on a placard underneath each painting. Then, three asking prices appear each on movable walls behind the paintings. The team must place each asking price behind each one of the paintings. After all three paintings and prices have been paired; the team is then given the opportunity to make changes before locking in the pairs. To win the round, all three prices must be correctly matched with their corresponding painting.
- Break the Bank: Four collectable items are brought out and described. Each item has a corresponding UPC code. Also, a predetermined amount is given. The team must choose any two items which are then scanned by Cedric. There is only one combination of two items whose combined total is more than the predetermined amount. If the correct two items are chosen, the team wins the round.
- Money Round: Three collectable items are brought out and described on top of a table surrounded by a hand cranked ticker-tape device placed underneath. On the tape are seven dollar amounts; Three of the dollar amounts are the actual dollar value of the collectables listed in order from left to right, and are spaced so an amount is centered directly underneath each item. One team member must crank the tape until the team places the correct dollar amount under each item. After all three items and prices have been paired; the team is then given the opportunity to make changes before locking in the pairs. To win the round, all three prices must be correctly matched with their corresponding item.
- Money Order: The team is shown three extravagant items. It is up to the team to put pictures of all three items in order of value from least expensive on the left to most expensive on the right. Two versions were played:

- Version One: After all three items have been placed; the team is then given the opportunity to make changes before locking in the order.
- Version Two: without consultation; one team member chose the least expensive item, the other chose the most expensive item and the item in the middle fell into place.

In both versions, all three items must be in the correct order to win the round.

- Don’t Get Declined: The team is given a giant gold credit card from the "Bank of Cedric" with a predetermined credit limit. Four collectable items are brought out and described. The team must purchase any two items; the card is swiped into a card reader for each purchase. There is only one combination of two items that is less than the predetermined amount. If the correct combination of two items is chosen, the team wins the round. However, if the combined total of the two chosen items is more than the predetermined credit limit, the card is declined and the team loses the round.

=== Final Round ===
- It's Worth More!: The team is shown and described four different collectable items. Then, four more collectable items are brought out and described, one at a time, each representing the "house". Each time, the team pairs the house item under the team item that costs more than the house item. After all eight items have been paired, the team is then given the opportunity to make changes before locking in the pairs. Once the pairs are locked in, the team chooses which pair to reveal one pair at a time. The dollar values of each item in the pairings are revealed. If the team item is more than the house item, the match is correct and the team wins the amount of their bank multiplied by a specific number. This does not happen if the team banks $100,000 in the first six rounds. The more correct matches means the more money won.

# of Correct Matches	Bank Multiplier	Amount if $100,000 is banked
1	1x	$100,000
2	2x	$250,000
3	4x	$500,000
4	10x	$1,000,000

If at any time a team item is revealed to be less than the house item, the match is incorrect, the game is over, and the team wins only 25% of their original bank.

The team has the option to quit at any time and leave with whatever is in their bank at that point. However, the team must make at least one correct match in order to receive that option. At the end of the game, regardless of how it ended, the values of all the pairs are revealed along with the winning order of the correct matches.
