= Nicky Clayton =

Professor of Comparative Cognition

Professor Nicky Clayton FRS FSB
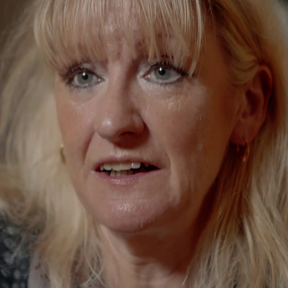
- Born: 22 November 1962 (age 63)
- Citizenship: United Kingdom
- Education: University of Oxford; University of St Andrews
- Scientific career
- Fields: Comparative cognition
- Workplaces: University of Cambridge; Rambert Dance Company
- Thesis: (1987)
- Nicky Clayton's voice from the BBC programme The Life Scientific, 22 November 2011.
- Website: www.nickyclayton.com; twitter.com/nickyclayton22

Nicola Susan Clayton (born 22 November 1962) is a British psychologist. She is Professor of Comparative Cognition at the University of Cambridge, Scientist in Residence at Rambert Dance Company, co-founder of 'The Captured Thought', a fellow of Clare College, Cambridge, where she is Director of Studies in Psychology, and a fellow of the Royal Society since 2010. Clayton was made Honorary Director of Studies and advisor to the 'China UK Development Centre'(CUDC) in 2018. She has been awarded professorships by Nanjing University, Institute of Technology, China (2018), Beijing University of Language and Culture, China (2019), and Hangzhou Diangi University, China (2019). Clayton was made Director of the Cambridge Centre for the Integration of Science, Technology and Culture (CCISTC) in 2020. A position she held until 2023. Since 2024, Clayton is deputy chair of the steering committee for the future researcher initiative at UniHive.

== Early life and education ==
Clayton graduated with a Bachelor of Arts with Honours in zoology from the University of Oxford in 1984, before gaining a PhD from the University of St Andrews in 1987.

== Career ==
=== University of Cambridge ===
Clayton has made major contributions in the study of animal cognition as well as cognitive development in human children, with significant impact in the neurobiology of memory and overall cognitive development.^{[5]}Her expertise in the study of comparative cognition integrates a knowledge of both biology and psychology in providing new methods of thinking about the evolution and development of intelligence in non-verbal animals and pre-verbal children. Clayton studies cognition not only in humans but also in members of the crow family (including jackdaws, rooks and jays). This work has challenged many assumptions that only humans can reminisce about the past and plan for the future, and that only humans can understand other times as well as other minds. Her work has also led to a re-evaluation of the cognitive capacities of animals, specifically birds, and resulted in a theory that intelligence evolved independently in at least two groups, the apes and the crows, and most recently cephalopods. This has also had scientific impact in changing the Animal Welfare (Sentience) Bill. Nicky presented an edition of Between the Ears entitled 'Year of the Covids' on BBC Radio 3 on 3 April 2023.

Nicky Clayton being interviewed for the Dutch TV-show The Mind of the Universe.

=== Rambert Dance Company ===
Since 2009, Clayton has worked with the Rambert Dance Company as science collaborator, then scientific adviser, and now scientist-in-residence. As a dancer, specializing in tango and salsa, she draws evidence from both the arts and science in her collaborations. In 2009, Clayton experienced her first collaboration by becoming involved in a dance piece called The Comedy of Change, which was inspired by Charles Darwin's ideas of natural and sexual selection. She met the choreographer and Artistic Director of Rambert Dance Company, Mark Baldwin, and gave input about science that could inform the piece. Other choreographic works inspired by science Clayton has collaborated with Baldwin on include Seven For a Secret, Never To Be Told, What Wild Ecstasy, The Strange Charm of Mother Nature, The Creation, Perpetual Movement and Bold.

The piece Seven For a Secret, Never To Be Told was based on the psychology of children, an area of Clayton's research. Clayton singled out themes related to the behavioural development of children, such as the importance of play, which helped to inspire the choreography. This piece was another collaboration between Clayton and Baldwin; the title inspired by a line from the nursery rhyme One for Sorrow, which was based on a superstition associating the number of magpies one sees to prediction of one's future.

=== The Captured Thought ===
Clayton on the theory of mind. What is thinking? How do people and animals think?

Another of Clayton's collaborations is with the artist and author Clive Wilkins, who has been Artist in Resident in the psychology department at the University of Cambridge since 2012, a position created especially for Wilkins. Their collaboration arose out of a mutual interest in mental time travel and resulted in Clayton and Wilkins co-founding "The Captured Thought~ an arts/science collaboration." Their work and lectures explore the subjective experience of thinking, by drawing evidence from both science and the arts to examine perception and the nature of mental time travel, as well as the mechanisms we use to think about the future and reminisce about the past. The goal of this project is to illuminate ideas concerning memories and question the power of analysis. Important aspects of The Captured Thought's work have been highlighted in articles in 'The Guardian' newspaper in 2019 and in 'Die Zeit' magazine in 2020. The Captured Thought were invited speakers at The University of Vienna's CogSciHub inauguration 2019 and India's National Brain Research Centre 16th Foundation Day. Clayton and Wilkins continue to present their work in lectures to universities and conferences across the globe~ including UK, Europe, USA, Asia, China and Australasia. Their work together featured in the New Scientist Special Christmas and New Year issue 2022.

== Published works ==
- 1998: Episodic-like memory during cache recovery by scrub jays
- 2001: Effects of experience and social context on prospective caching strategies in scrub jays
- 2004: The mentality of crows. Convergent evolution of intelligence in corvids and apes
- 2006: Food-caching western scrubjays keep track of who was watching when
- 2007: Planning for the future by Western Scrub-Jays
- 2009: Western scrub-jays conceal auditory information when competitors can hear but cannot see
- 2009: Episodic future thinking in 3- to 5- year-old-children: The ability to think of what will be needed from a different point of view
- 2009: Chimpanzees solve the trap problem when the confound of tool-use is removed
- 2012: Eurasian jays (Garrulus glandarius) overcome their current desires to anticipate two distinct future needs and plan for them appropriately
- 2013: Careful cachers and prying pilferers: Eurasian jays (Garrulus glandarius) limit auditory information available to competitors
- 2013: Evidence suggesting that desire-state attribution may govern food sharing in Eurasian jays
- 2014: EPS Mid Career Award Lecture. Ways of Thinking: From Crows to Children and Back Again
- 2014: Of babies and birds: complex tool behaviours are not sufficient for the evolution of the ability to create a novel causal intervention
- 2014: Pilfering Eurasian jays use visual and acoustic information to locate caches
- 2014: The Evolution of Self Control
- 2015: Thinking ahead about where something is needed: New insights about episodic foresight in preschoolers
- 2019: Tricks of the Mind. Experiencing the Impossible Current Biology. Book review
- 2019: Mind Tricks. Magic and mysticism reveal cognitive shortcuts with implications beyond entertainment
- 2019: Reflections on the Spoon Test. Neuropsychologia
- 2020: An unexpected audience. Science
- 2021: Exploring the perceptual inabilities of Eurasian jays (Garrulus glandarius) using magic effects. PNAS
- 2021: Schnell, A.K., Clayton, N.S., Hanlon, R.T. & Jozet-Alves, C.. Episodic-like memory is preserved with age in cuttlefish. Proceedings of the Royal Society, 288, 20211052
- 2021: Schnell, A. K., Loconsole, M., Garcia-Pelegrin, E., Wilkins, C. & Clayton, N. S.. Jays are sensitive to cognitive illusions. Royal Society Open Science, 8, 202358
- 2021: Garcia-Pelegrin, E., Wilkins, C. & Clayton, N. S.. The ape that lived to tell the tale. The evolution of the art of storytelling and its relationship to Mental Time Travel and Theory of Mind. Frontiers in Psychology 12, 755–783
- 2022: Garcia-Pelegrin, E., Schnell, A. K., Wilkins, C. & Clayton, N. S.. Could it be Protomagic? Deceptive tactics in non-human animals resemble magician’s misdirection. Psychology of Consciousness: Theory, Research and Practice, in press
- 2022: Garcia-Pelegrin, E., Wilkins, C. & Clayton, N. S.. Are magicians specialists at identifying deceptive motion? The role of expertise in being fooled by sleight of hand. Scientific Reports, in press
- 2023: Goldberg J, Wilkins, C. A. P. & Clayton, N. S. (2023). Sleight of Wing. The Linking Ring, in press
- 2023: Garcia-Pelegrin, E., Miller, R. A., Wilkins, C. A. P. & Clayton, N. S. (2023). Manual action expectation and biomechanical ability in three species of New World monkey. Current Biology, 33, 1-6.
- 2024: Garcia-Pelegrin, E., Schnell, A. K., Wilkins, C. & Clayton, N. S. (2024). Beyond the Tricks: The Science and Comparative Cognition of Magic. Annual Review of Psychology 75, 289–293
- 2025: Ajuwon, V., Monteiro, T,. Schnell, A. K. & Clayton, N. S. (2025). To Know or Not to Know. Curiousity and the value of prospective information in animals. Learning and Behavior 53, 114-127
- 2025: Cornero, F. C., Lane, W. & Clayton. N. S. (2025). Can an old rook learn new tricks? Vocal command comprehesion [sic?] and obedience in rooks. Animal Cognition, in Press.
- 2025: Veit, W., Browning, H., Garcia-Pelegrin, E., Davies, J. R., DuBois, J. G. & Clayton, N. S. (2025). Dimensions of Corvid Consciousness. Animal Cognition, 28(1), 1-17.
- 2026: Pendleton, Pritchard, Wilkinson, Wilkins, Clayton (2026) From plausibility in climate-risk scenarios: a cognitive framework for decision-making under deep uncertainty

== Awards ==
- 1997: Best Teachers in America Award
- 1999: American Psychological Association's Frank Beach Award
- 2003: Klaus Immelmann Award in Animal Behavior
- 2010: Jean-Marie Delwart Award in Comparative and Evolutionary Neuroscience, Belgium Academy of Sciences
- 2010: Elected Fellow of the Royal Society
- 2012: Experimental Psychology Society Mid-Career Award
- 2013: Fellow of the American Ornithological Society
- 2019: President of the British Science Association Psychology Section
- 2021: ASAB Tinbergen Lecturer award
- 2022: Association for the Study of Animal Behaviour (ASAB) Medal
- 2024: Comparative Cognition Research Award and special issue of the journal Learning and Behavior and associated podcast.
