= Verrey's =

Former country house in London

Coordinates: 51.514078°N 0.141892°W

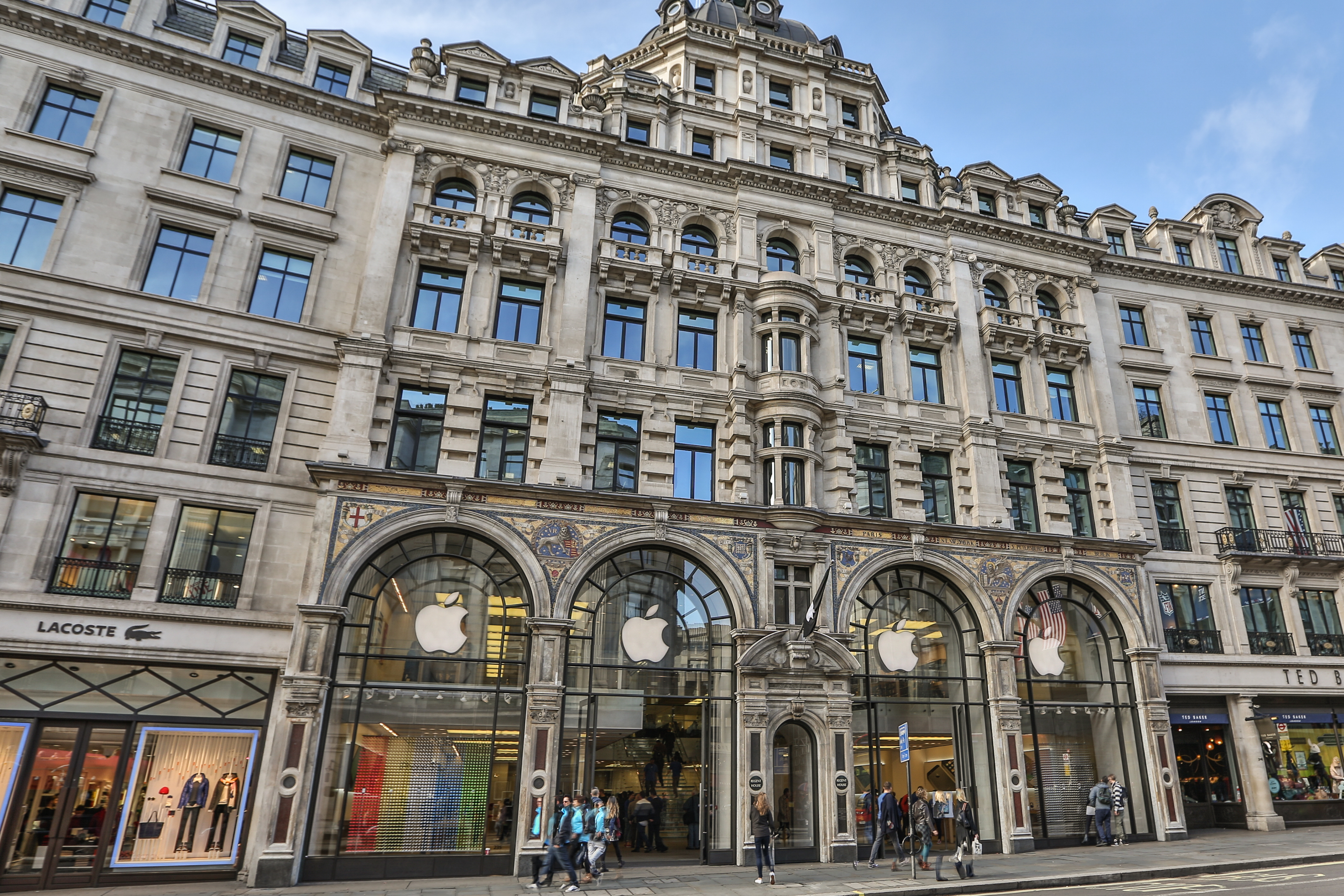
229–247 Regent Street, formerly housed Verrey's in the 19th century

Verrey's on Regent Street in London, was one of the most popular restaurants of the 19th century. An establishment which was frequented by Victorian high society, it was one of the earliest restaurants in London.

== History and description ==
The restaurant was opened in 1825 by Swiss confectioner Charles Verrey who lived on Regent Street. First selling confectionery, Verrey ran it alongside his daughter, and by 1848 it was also a restaurant.

By the 1850s it was established as an eatery of high repute, popular particularly among high profile foreign visitors. It served dishes of french cuisine, and was said to rival the Café Royal.

By 1879, Charles Dickens Jr. described Verrey's as "perhaps the oldest of the real Restaurants in London. Among those who frequented the restaurant were the future King Edward VII, Charles Dickens, Benjamin Disraeli, Alfred Lord Tennyson and William Ewart Gladstone.

In the 1970s, Ainsley Harriott took began his career as a junior trainee at the restaurant under chef Kevin Kennedy. The restaurant closed in 1985.
