= Susie Wilkins =

English singer-songwriter

- Genres: Blues; Jazz; Rock; Soul
- Occupation: Singer-songwriter
- Instruments: Vocals, guitar, keyboards
- Years active: 1993-present

Susie Wilkins is an English singer-songwriter, producer and multi-instrumentalist.

== Biography ==
Raised in Hong Kong, Wilkins commenced her musical career in the mid-1990s as a regular at the Hong Kong Fringe Club’s Open Mic sessions and at other local venues such as Post97 and the Jazz Club.

In 2002, Wilkins released her first album, Half Empty, which was recorded partly live at the Hong Kong Fringe Club. The album was mastered at London’s Abbey Road Studios and released on Wilkins’ own label, Rootless Records.

In 2004, she released a self-produced EP, Bliss. Her songs have since received considerable airplay in the US, UK and Southeast Asia.

In 2008, she supported Joe Jackson for most European dates of his Rain tour, playing at venues such as London's Shepherd's Bush Empire, Paris' La Cigale, Amsterdam's Paradiso and Berlin's Schiller Theater.

In 2011, Wilkins released her second album, Anywhere but Here, which features Jeremy Stacey on drums and Mike Visceglia on bass. The album was mixed by Grammy Award winning producer Ryan Freeland in Los Angeles.

Following its release, Anywhere but Here attracted the attention of the British radio presenter Tom Robinson, which led to a number of tracks, including “I Hope” and “Too Tired to Cry”, receiving airplay on BBC Radio 6. In April 2012, “No Answer” was featured as Track of the Day by British music blog the VPME. In September 2012, the track “Wasted Time” was featured on Tom Robinson's music blog, Fresh on the Net, and in May 2014 was selected as a Daily Discovery by American Songwriter magazine.
