= Denis Hardy (economist) =

Quebecois economist

Denis Hardy is a Quebecois economist who served as a chief of staff for Bernard Landry, while he was deputy premier and minister of finances. He later became deputy chief of staff for premier Landry.

On April 22, 2003, he was appointed as assistant deputy minister in the Quebec finance ministry.
