= Victor Brown (musician) =

Victor Brown (1921–2016), known professionally as Vic Evans, was a Cuban-born, Jamaican-British variety performer, known for being one half of Harriott & Evans.

== Life ==
Victor Brown was born in Banes, Cuba, the son of Jamaican parents: John Brown, an engineer, and his wife Mirian, née Brown. He trained as an engine-room seaman and left Jamaica for Britain in 1939, before serving in World War II. He subsequently performed (eventually, with his brother Noel, as the Brown Brothers) for the Entertainments National Service Association and the League of Coloured Peoples, and then in nightclubs. He worked with Prince Zulamkah and then briefly joined forces with the pianist Winifred Atwell.

In 1947, he moved with his wife, Kameedea, née Packwood, to West Africa, where she was working as a nurse. While there, he joined Ghanaian music troupes (playing with E. T. Mensah and Guy Warren) and tried to establish a timber business. When that failed, he returned to Britain and began performing with his brother Noel, working their way to the Gateways, a pioneering lesbian club in Chelsea, where he met the pianist Chester Harriott. The pair formed a duo, with Harriott on the piano and Brown singing (he was a tenor), an arrangement that proved successful; they spent eight years playing and touring as a variety act, Harriott & Evans (for Victor Brown was then known on stage as Vic Evans), mixing with a booming jazz scene and travelling across the world. As support act for a Tommy Steele concert at the Blackpool Opera House in August 1961, they were described as "Europe's greatest coloured entertainers". Harriott and Evans went their separate ways in 1962.

In later life, Brown and his wife moved to Lancashire, settling in Morecambe. He died in 2016, aged 95.
