= Chester Harriott =

Jamaican-British pianist

Chester Leroy Harriott (24 February 1933 – 4 July 2013) was a Jamaican-born pianist and entertainer known for his eight years as one part of the variety act Harriott and Evans. He is the father of chef and television presenter, Ainsley Harriott.

== Life ==
Harriott was born in St Thomas, Jamaica, the son of a doctor's assistant, Oscar Harriott, and his wife, Minna (née Powell), a teacher. They later moved to the island's capital, Kingston, then the United States to study, leaving Chester and his siblings with relatives. (Note: The family's history was the subject of an episode of the BBC documentary series Who Do You Think You Are? in 2008.)

A gifted pianist from a young age, he appeared on local radio stations and followers set up a fund for him to study in London; in 1950, he joined Trinity College of Music and while there met Arthur Bennett, who taught him modern music. Through that connection, Harriott was introduced to the nightclub scene in central London, playing at the Langham Club for the likes of Princess Margaret. Throughout the early 1950s, he performed at Gateways, a pioneering lesbian club in Chelsea, as well as the Mandrake Club in Soho and the Sunset Club, where he performed alongside the celebrated jazz saxophonist Joe Harriott. (Note: The relationship between Chester and Joe Harriott is disputed. Chester's obituary in The Guardian states that "Although a family relationship between them has been rumoured, these is no evidence for this. The name is not rare in Jamaica, with at least three plantation owners having been called Harriott." While Alan Robertson had claimed they were cousins in his 2003 biography of Joe Harriott, the Jazz historian Val Wilmer took issue with this in an article in a letter to Jazz Journal International published in 2008.)

After finishing at Trinity, he partnered up with John Porter to form a double-act, but soon switched to form a lasting duo with Victor Brown. Performing for eight years as Harriott and Evans, a variety act, they travelled to Paris, toured and sold 50,000 copies of one album. In 1962, they parted ways and Harriott carried on performing solo before working for Granada Television from 1967. He opened a restaurant called Truffles in 1985 and retired from performing following an illness in the late-1990s. He outlived his first wife, Petronia, and later married a magician called Claudine. Harriott died on 4 July 2013 aged eighty years. He had five children, including the television chef Ainsley Harriott.
