= Brigitte Pelletier =

Canadian lawyer

Brigitte Pelletier (born 1964) is a Canadian lawyer in Quebec and former associate deputy minister of the Quebec Ministry of Justice. She is a graduate of Université Laval.

She was a former chief of staff for Quebec premier Bernard Landry in 2002-2003.

Following Landry's defeat in 2003, she was appointed as Associate Deputy Deputy Minister of Justice.
