= Marc Wilkins (geneticist) =

Australian scientist

Marc R. Wilkins
- Education: Macquarie University
- Known for: proteome
- Father: Ronald W. T. Wilkins
- Scientific career
- Workplaces: University of New South Wales
- Doctoral advisor: Keith Williams

Marc R. Wilkins is an Australian scientist who is credited with the defining the concept of the proteome. Wilkins is a professor in the School of Biotechnology and Biomolecular Sciences at the University of New South Wales, Sydney.

Wilkins coined the term proteome in 1994 whilst developing the concept as a PhD student at Macquarie University, Sydney, Australia, describing it as the "PROTein complement expressed by a genOME". The term is a generalisation of the concept of the genome to encompass the set of all proteins that can be produced through the genome through alternative splicing and post-transcriptional modification of messenger RNA.

== Career ==
Wilkins held a post-doctoral fellowship from 1995 to 1997 at the University of Geneva, Switzerland, working with Denis Hochstrasser and Amos Bairoch. He co-developed many of the protein analysis tools available on the ExPASy web server. He subsequently served as a senior post-doctoral fellow in the Australian Proteome Analysis Facility, which was established by the Australian Government in 1995 as the world's first dedicated proteome research centre.

In 1997 he co-edited the first book on proteomics, Proteome Research: New Frontiers in Functional Genomics (Wilkins et al. (eds), Springer Verlag), which sold more than 4,000 copies.

He was a co-founder of the proteomics company Proteome Systems Ltd. It was established in January 1999, and listed on the Australian Securities Exchange in 2004. Dr Wilkins worked in Proteome Systems full-time for 6 years as leader of its bioinformatics Research and Development team then as Head of Proteomics. It was awarded IBM's "Rookie of the Year Award" for companies in the Asia-Pacific region, in 2003. Proteome Systems was renamed Tyrian Diagnostics and ultimately divested its IP. In 2007, Wilkins co-founded the regenerative medicine company, Regeneus. This company has developed treatments for osteoarthritis using adult stem cells, which are now in clinical trials.

Wilkins is currently a professor of Systems Biology at the University of New South Wales, and is the director of the Systems Biology Initiative and the Ramaciotti Centre for Genomics. He has published more than 200 research papers and book chapters. His current research concerns the role of protein methylation in the eukaryotic cell, the use of crosslinking mass spectrometry (XL-MS) for proteome-scale analysis of protein interaction networks (the interactome) and the bioinformatic analysis of next-generation sequencing data. As part of the koala genome consortium, his team did all PacBio long-read sequencing and then Falcon-based assembly to generate the most complete and contiguous marsupial genome to date.

In 2012, Wilkins was awarded the Australian Society for Biochemistry and Molecular Biology's Beckman Coulter Discovery Science Award. This prize is awarded to a member for distinguished contributions to the field of biochemistry and molecular biology. The University of New South Wales awarded Wilkins a Doctor of Science (D. Sc.) in 2018.

Recently, he has enjoyed collaborating on the Human Proteome Project (published 2020) and the Human RNA Atlas Project (published 2021).
