= Ronald W. T. Wilkins =

Australian geochemist and poet

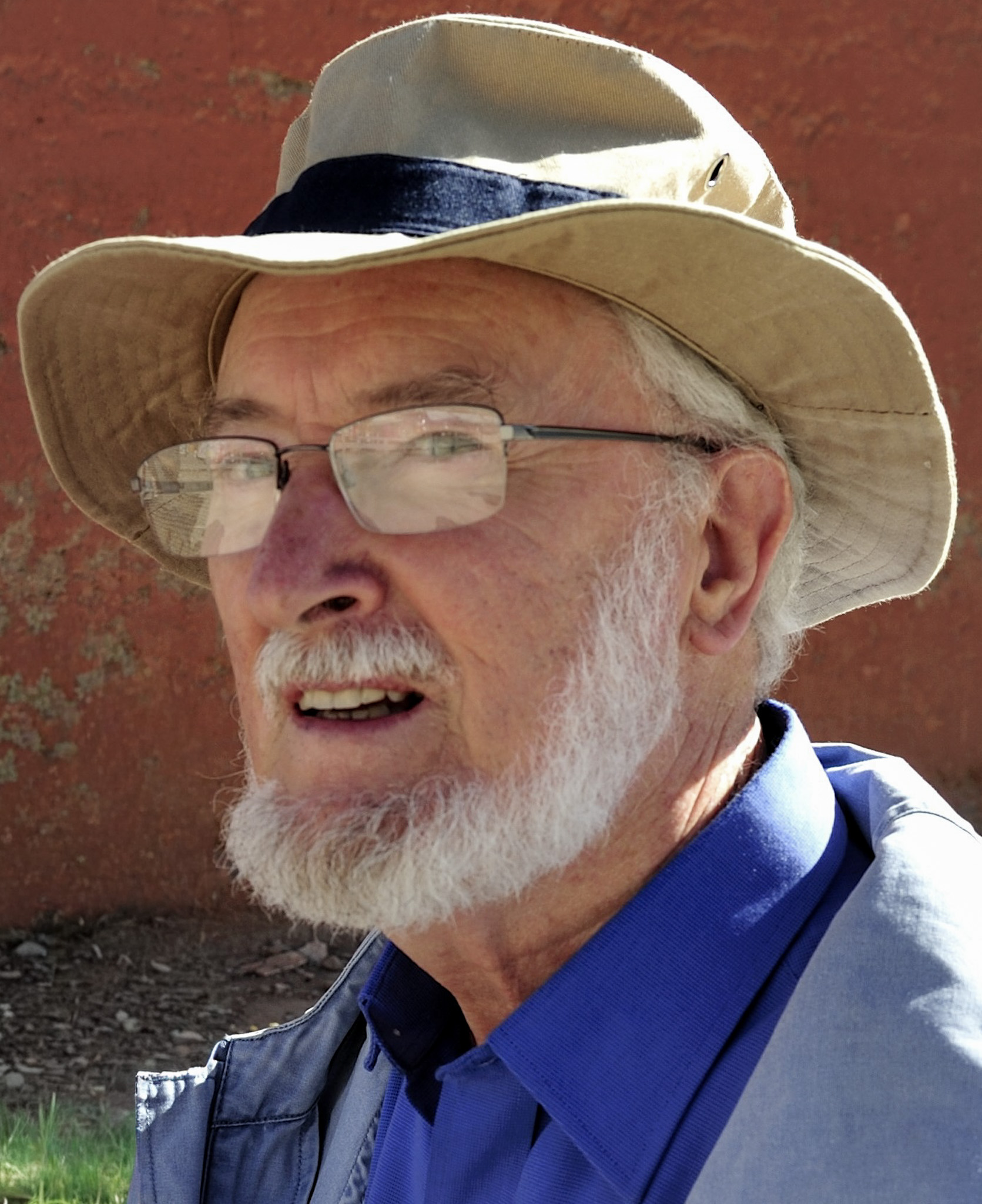
- In Gannan, Gansu, China (2013)
- Born: Ronald William Thomas Wilkins; 23 December 1935 (age 90); Moreland (Melbourne, Australia)
- Citizenship: Australian
- Education: University of Melbourne; University of Cambridge
- Occupation: Geochemist
- Spouse: Paula Car
- Children: Irmgard, Marc and Christopher
- Scientific career
- Fields: Geochemistry
- Workplaces: Harvard University; University of Queensland; Australian Commonwealth Scientific and Industrial Research Organization (CSIRO)
- Thesis: Rate Studies of Some Chemical Weathering Processes (1965)
- Doctoral advisor: J. D. C. McConnell FRS

Ron Wilkins
- Occupation: Scientist
- Writing career
- Language: English
- Years active: 2000-
- Genre: Poetry
- Subjects: Nature, Perception, Travel experiences
- Movement: Poetic naturalism
- Website: www.fistfulofdust.com

Ronald W. T. Wilkins (born 1935 in Melbourne) is an Australian geochemist and poet.

His scientific research work, largely based on chemical spectroscopy of earth materials, was focussed on the origin of Australian orebodies and the exploration for petroleum accumulations. As a poet, his work has been published worldwide in literary magazines and anthologies.

== Biography ==
Ronald William Thomas Wilkins was born on 23 December 1935 in Moreland, an inner suburb of Melbourne, Australia, to Welsh and Australian parents. He was educated at local government schools and at Footscray Technical College, where he obtained a diploma in industrial chemistry.

He did not follow this occupation, however. During his school years he had become interested in fossils, and this decided him to accept an appointment as assistant to the curator of palaeontology at what was then the National Museum of Victoria, during which time he finished a BSc degree in geology and chemistry at the University of Melbourne.

After completing an MSc on the sediments of the Bairnsdale area, Victoria, where the provenance of the sediments was obscured by weathering, he further pursued the subject in the Department of Mineralogy and Petrology at Cambridge with PhD studies on the kinetics of mineral-water reactions, and began spectroscopic studies on minerals, which he continued at Harvard University (Note: The Harvard Collection of Historical Scientific Instruments has a preserved record of his time at the David and Arnold Hoffman Laboratory of Experimental Geology in the 1960s: "Ventilation plate for instrument". chsi.emuseum.com. 2025.) and at the University of Queensland.

In 1972 he joined the Division of Mineralogy in Australian Commonwealth Scientific and Industrial Research Organization (CSIRO), and subsequently the Division of Petroleum Resources where he eventually achieved the grade of a chief research scientist. He received the DSc degree for his work on the spectroscopy of earth materials from the University of Melbourne in 1995. A frequent visitor to China at the invitation of the Chinese Academy of Sciences, he lectured and researched on Chinese petroleum and coal-seam gas projects. He also spent extended periods in several French laboratories.

He married Paula Car in the Round Church of Cambridge in December 1963 while he was a student at St John’s College. They have three children, including geneticist Marc Wilkins. Ron Wilkins received a BA degree from Macquarie University in 1979, and after retirement returned to writing poetry. He lives in a wooded area of outer Sydney and enjoys as a hobby the identification of the more than 900 species of Eucalyptus in Australia.

== Scientific works ==
Wilkins contributed to a new wave of mineralogical research during the 1960s in which spectroscopic methods were applied to the study of mineral reactions and transformations.

As of 1972 he has devised methods of fluid inclusion study of orebodies and host rocks to unravel the sequence of trapped fluids in ancient deformed and metamorphic terrains such as Broken Hill (New South Wales) and Mount Isa (Queensland).

Applying a laser Raman microprobe, he obtained chemical information on micron-sized dispersed organic matter in sediments. He also developed new thermal maturity tools based on fluorescence and Raman spectroscopy (FAMM (Note: Fluorescence Alteration of Multiple Macerals.) and RaMM (Note: Raman Maturity Method.)) which were widely applied in the developing oilfields of the North West Shelf of Australia and elsewhere.

Wilkins wrote about 100 scientific papers in peer-reviewed journals.

=== Awards ===
- Frank Leslie Stillwell Award of the Geological Society of Australia (1985)
- Ralph Gray Award of the Society for Organic Petrology (2022)

== Literary works ==
Wilkins’s poetry has been published in literary magazines and anthologies in Australia, USA, England, France, China, Romania and other countries. His two books of poetry and drawings are Fistful of Dust (2012) and Séjours en France et autres pays (2025).

Major themes are observation of the natural world, the nature of perception, and experiences in France and China. His work received positive reviews from fellow poets. According to Mark Tredinnick, "Ron Wilkins's poems look with sly joy on the world, caught without its clothes on, under his kind gaze. These are poems of tender Goethian attention to trees and termites, forks and rainfall; to the strange and glorious etiquettes of the physical world . . . Astute, gentle, scholarly poems." For Les Wicks, ". . . one has to marvel at the vast, unquenchable curiosity that runs through Ron’s work. There is a global shortage of this invaluable human trait. You find it everywhere in [his latest] book . . ."
