= Clive Wilkins =

British figurative artist

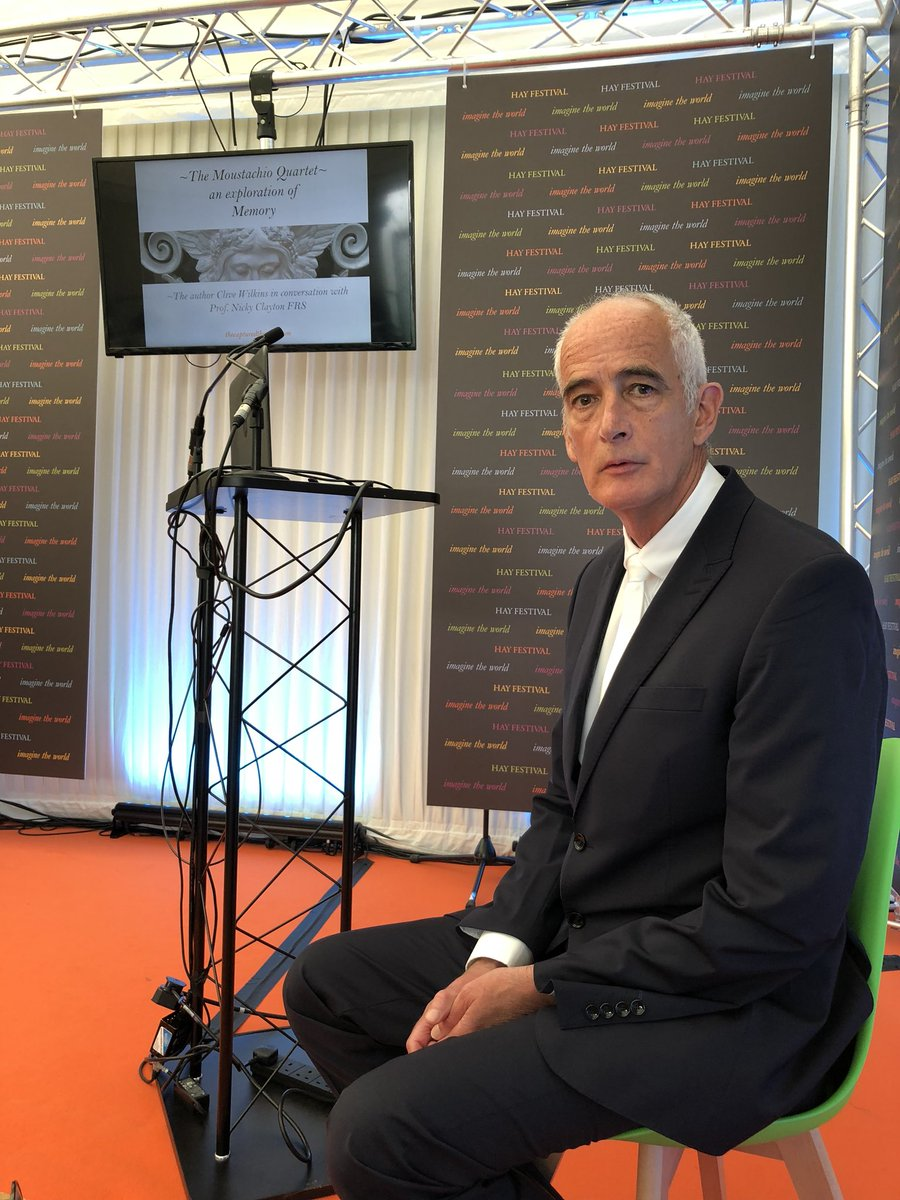
- Wilkins discussing The Moustachio Quartet at the Hay Festival in 2018
- Born: June 25, 1954 (age 72); Wolverhampton, Staffordshire
- Known for: Artist in Residence, Department of Psychology, The University of Cambridge, Member of The Magic Circle
- Notable work: The Creatures in the Night, The Moustachio Quartet, The Lost Library of Miraculous Metaphors & other short stories
- Website: www.psychol.cam.ac.uk/people/clive-wilkins

Clive Wilkins (born 25 June 1954) is a British figurative artist. He is the author of The Moustachio Quartet, a series of novels that explore perception and the subjective experience of thinking; and with Nicky Clayton is co-founder of the Captured Thought, an arts and science collaboration. He is the first Artist in Residence in the Department of Psychology at The University of Cambridge, a position held since 2012. Wilkins, along with Clayton, was made Honorary Director of Studies and advisor to the China UK Development Centre (CUDC) in 2018 ~ a position he held until 2024. He has been awarded professorships by Nanjing University, Institute of Technology, China (2018), Beijing University of Language and Culture, China (2019), and Hangzhou Diangi University, China (2019). Wilkins was made Co-Director of the Cambridge Centre for the Integration of Science, Technology and Culture (CCISTC) in 2020 ~ a position he held until 2024.

== Education ==
Clive Wilkins was born in Wolverhampton, Staffs, and grew up and was educated in Corby, Northants. He went on to the Tresham Institute, Kettering, (formerly Kettering Technical College) where he enrolled on the art foundation course at the age of 17. Amongst others, his tutors were David Imms, who taught painting and printmaking, and Norman Laing, who taught architecture and the history of art. He went from there to DeMontfort University, (formerly Leicester Polytechnic) where he was tutored and greatly influenced by George Him, and also came into contact with Jerzy Karo, the Head of School for Graphic Design. Wilkins graduated with a Bachelor of Arts with Honours in Graphic Design, before gaining an Art Teacher's Diploma (ATD) and Post Graduate Diploma in Education (PGCE).

== Paintings ==
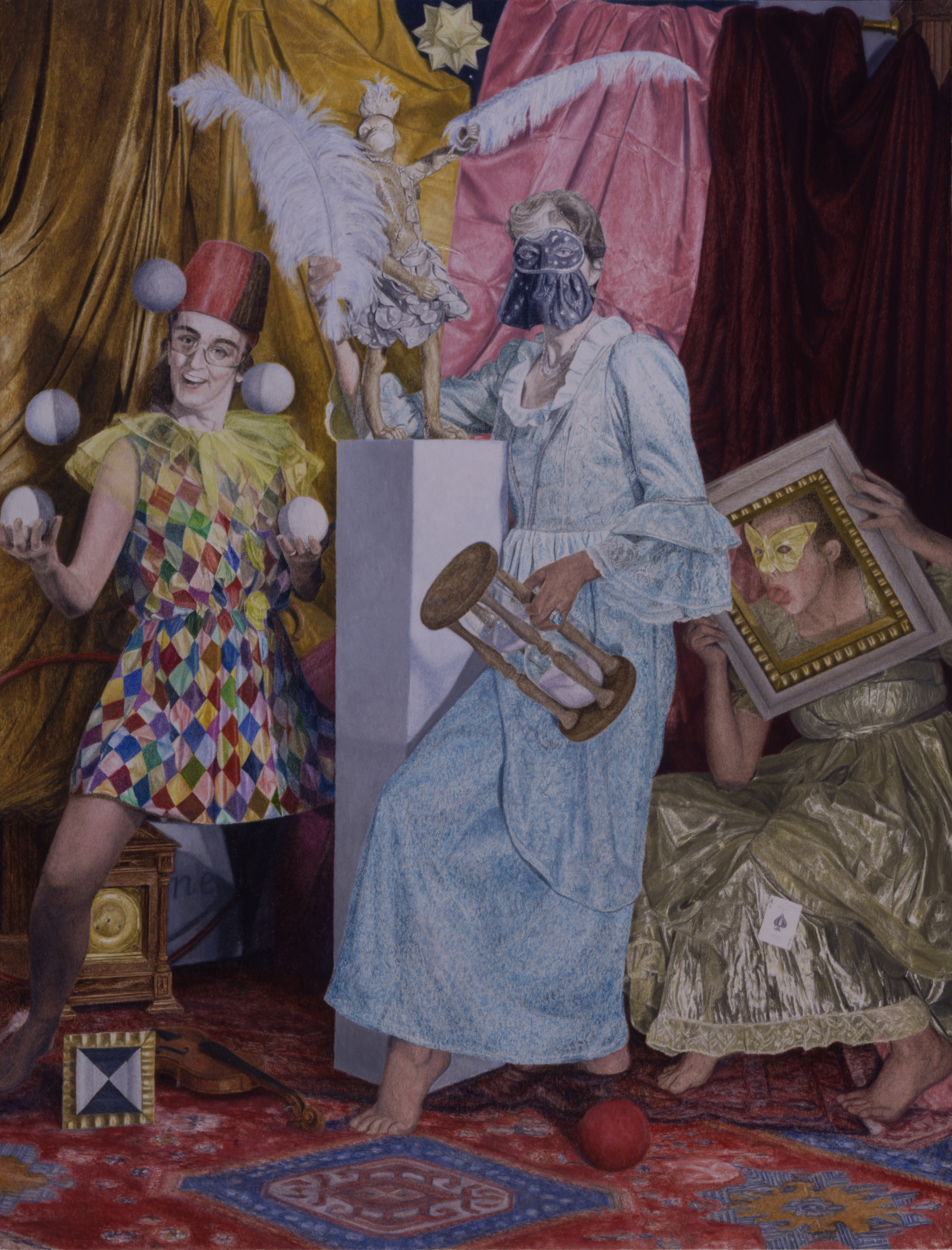
The Masquerade Creatures

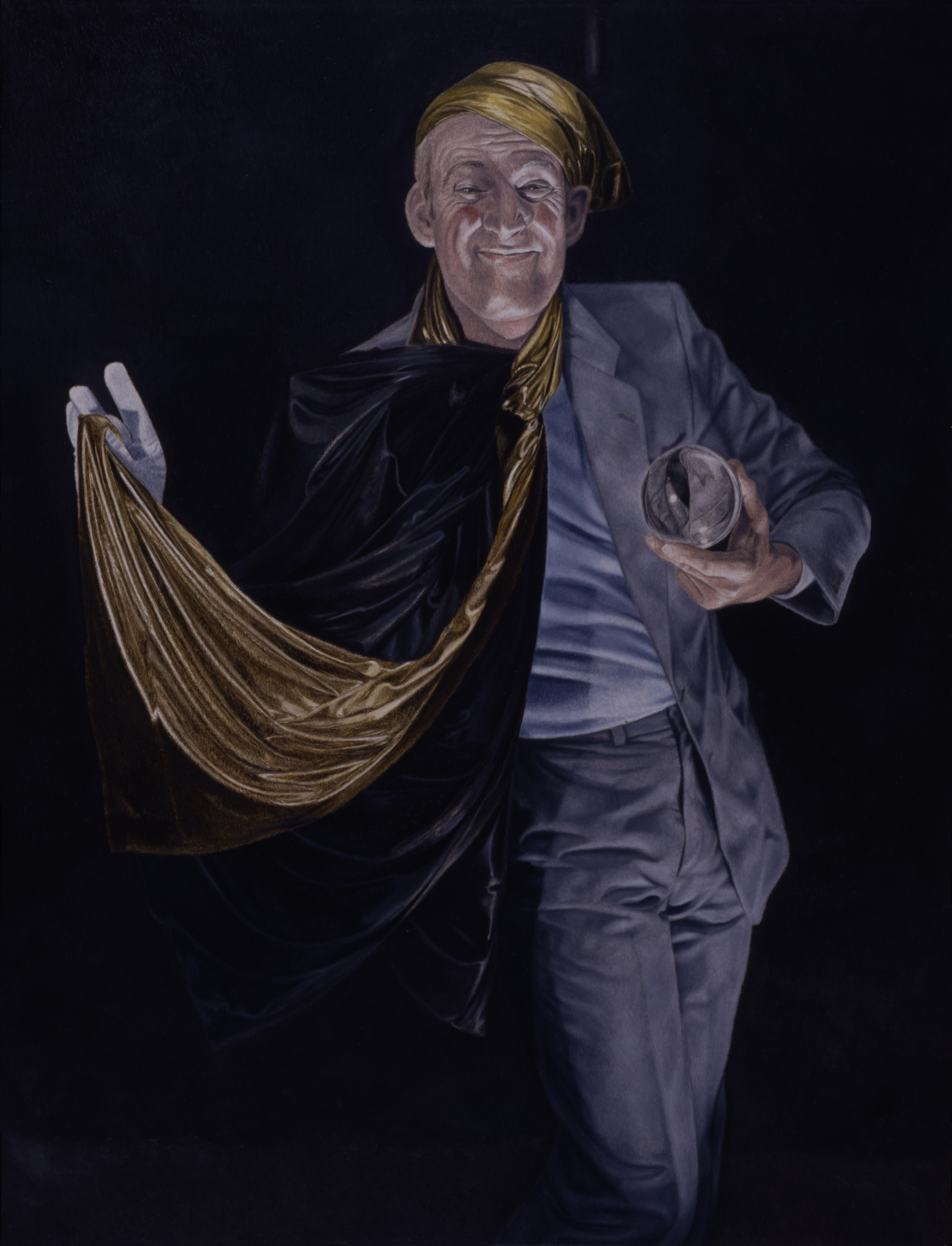
The Silverman

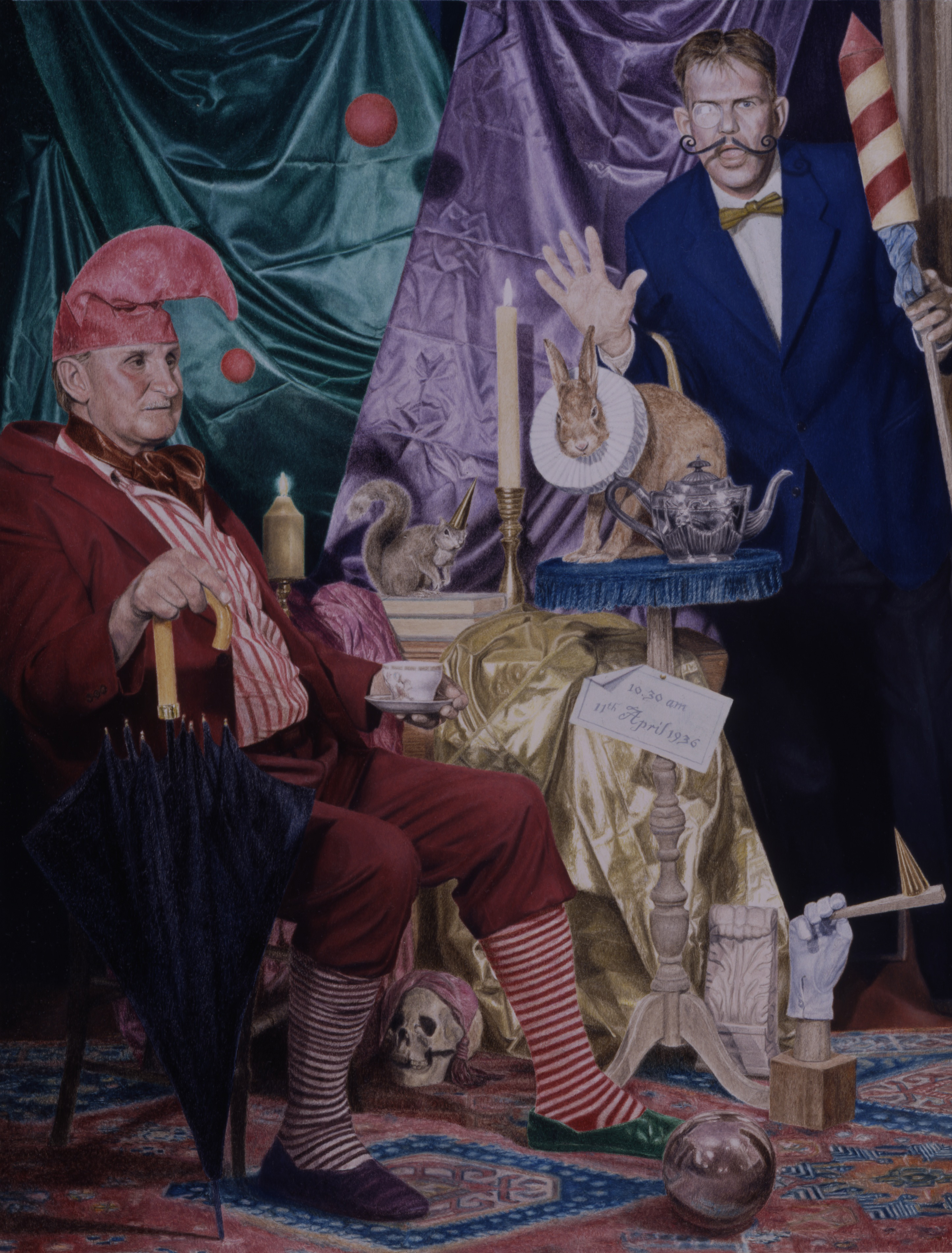
The Ambassadors

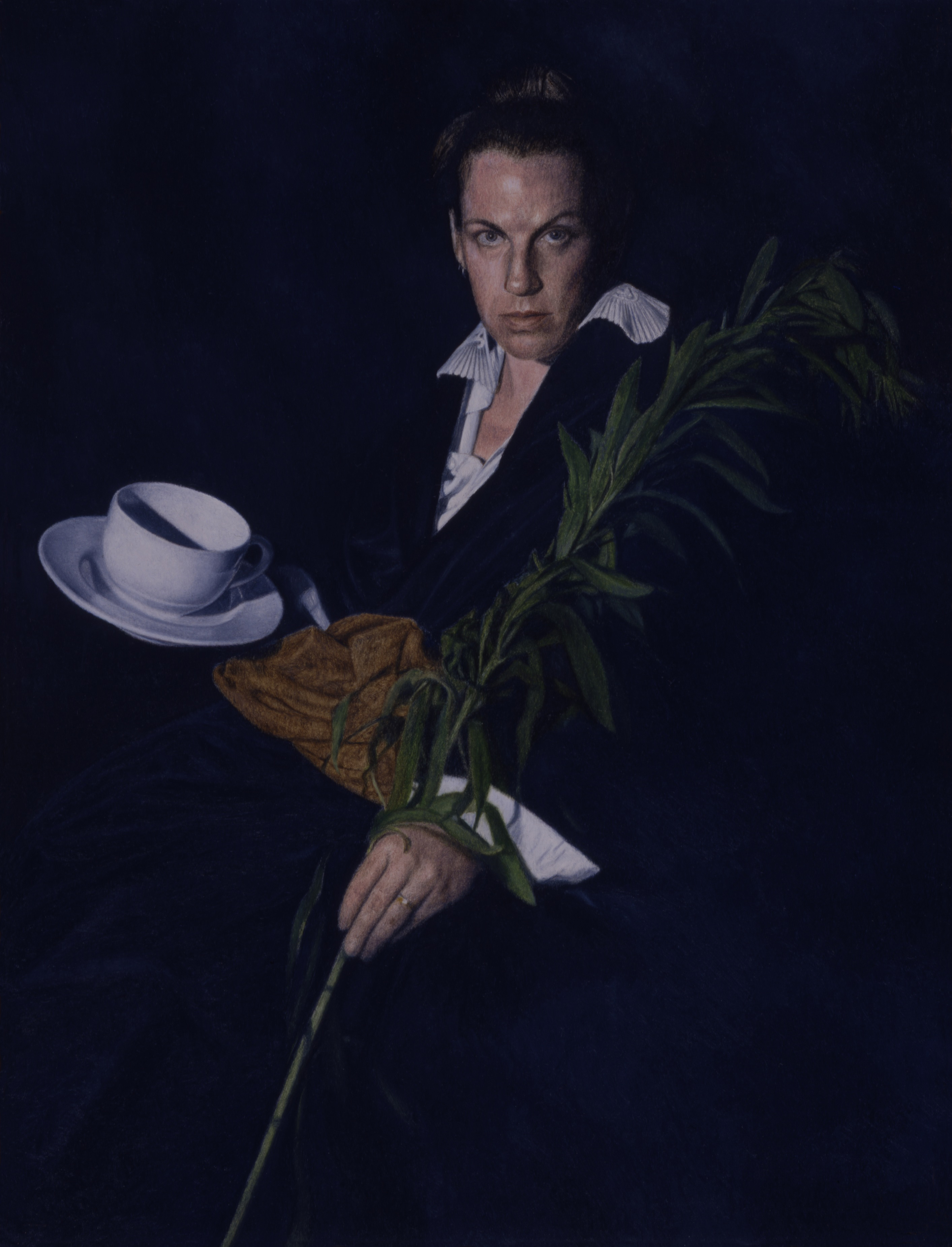
The Lacemaker

Wilkins has exhibited in the John Player Portrait Awards (1985, 1986, 1987) and in the BP Portrait Awards (1994, 1995).

Wilkins has produced portraits of the British pop artist Sir Peter Blake RA and Sir Howard Hodgkin CH CBE amongst others, and was presented to HRH Princess Royal during a visit to the Royal Holloway University in 1994.

Wilkins' work appears in The Creatures in the Night, a published picture book sequence of 31 paintings, with accompanying text by the artist. The artwork, along with other works by Wilkins, formed a one-man show (2005) at Petley Fine Art Limited, Cork Street, London. He was described, in the foreword to the exhibition catalogue by Roy Petley as "one of the UK's leading figurative painters".

Wilkins paintings have been exhibited in a number of venues, including the following:

- Royal Academy Summer Exhibition, London, 1984
- National Portrait Gallery, London, 1985
- Royal Academy Summer Exhibition, London, 1986
- Royal Academy Summer Exhibition, London, 1994
- National Portrait Gallery, London, 1995

== The Captured Thought ==
Wilkins, along with Nicky Clayton, Professor of Comparative Cognition at the University of Cambridge, is co-founder of "The Captured Thought". The collaboration explores the nature of memory and perception with a particular focus on creativity. Important aspects of The Captured Thought's work have been highlighted in articles in 'The Guardian' newspaper in 2019 and in 'Die Zeit' magazine in 2020. The Captured Thought were invited speakers at The University of Vienna's CogSciHub inauguration 2019, and India's National Brain Research Centre 16th Foundation Day. Their work featured in the New Scientist Special Christmas and New Year issue 2022. Wilkins interests are primarily in the psychology and structures of problem solving and the subjective experience of thinking. The collaboration has published the following:

- 2012: Occam's Typewriter
- 2012: Imagination: The Secret Landscape
- 2016: Current Biology
- 2016: The Psychologist Magazine
- 2017: After Nyne
- 2017: The Royal Society Interface
- 2018: The Seven Myths of Memory
- 2019: Tricks of the Mind. Experiencing the Impossible. Current Biology. Book review.
- 2019: Mind Tricks. Magic and mysticism reveal cognitive shortcuts with implications beyond entertainment. Science (journal)
- 2019: Reflections on the Spoon Test. Neuropsychologia
- 2020: An unexpected audience. Science (journal)
- 2021: Exploring the perceptual inabilities of Eurasian jays (Garrulus glandarius) using magic effects. PNAS
- 2021: Schnell, A. K., Loconsole, M., Garcia-Pelegrin, E., Wilkins, C. & Clayton, N. S.. Jays are sensitive to cognitive illusions. Royal Society Open Science, 8, 202358
- 2021: Garcia-Pelegrin, E., Wilkins, C. & Clayton, N. S.. The ape that lived to tell the tale. The evolution of the art of storytelling and its relationship to Mental Time Travel and Theory of Mind. Frontiers in Psychology 12, 755-783
- 2022: Garcia-Pelegrin, E., Schnell, A. K., Wilkins, C. & Clayton, N. S.. Could it be Protomagic? Deceptive tactics in non-human animals resemble magician's misdirection. Psychology of Consciousness: Theory, Research and Practice, in press
- 2022: Garcia-Pelegrin, E., Wilkins, C. & Clayton, N. S.. Are magicians specialists at identifying deceptive motion? The role of expertise in being fooled by sleight of hand. Scientific Reports, in press
- 2023: Goldberg J, Wilkins, C. A. P. & Clayton, N. S. (2023). Sleight of Wing. The Linking Ring, in press
- 2023: Garcia-Pelegrin, E., Miller, R. A., Wilkins, C. A. P. & Clayton, N. S. (2023). Monkey Magic. Current Biology, in press
- 2024: Garcia-Pelegrin, E., Schnell, A. K., Wilkins, C. & Clayton, N. S. (2024). Beyond the Tricks: The Science and Comparative Cognition of Magic. Annual Review of Psychology 75, 289-293
- 2025: Drerup, Garcia Pelegrin, Wilkins, Herbert Read, Clayton (2025) Tactical deception in cephalopods: a new framework for understanding cognition. Trends in Ecology & Evaluation
- 2026: Pendleton, Pritchard, Wilkinson, Wilkins, Clayton (2026) From plausibility in climate-risk scenarios: a cognitive framework for decision-making under deep uncertainty

== Awards and honours ==
Wilkins won joint second prize in the Hunting Art Awards with Tom Phillips in 1988.
