= Bray Wilkins =

Founder of Middleton, Massachusetts (d. 1702)

- Born: c. 1610; Kingdom of England
- Died: January 12, 1702; Middleton, Province of Massachusetts Bay
- Known for: Founder of Middleton, Massachusetts; accuser in the Salem witch trials

Bray Wilkins (probably pronounced US: /wɪlkiːnz/; c. 1610 – January 12, 1702 [O.S. January 1, 1702]) was a patriarch and founder of Middleton, Massachusetts. Bray's origins are not concretely known and are supplanted (and probably distorted) by familial tradition, however his reputation was already prolific in the Massachusetts Bay Colony decades before his death. His progeny, the Wilkins family, had a strong presence in the area. Bray and his family were prominent figures in some Salem Witch Trials.

== Early life ==
Very little is known about Bray's life before emigrating to the Massachusetts Bay Colony. It is known from his own admission and other records which required such information that Bray was born about 1610. Being an immigrant, it is presumed Bray hailed from the Kingdom of England, but where exactly he was born is debated. By the 20th century, a commonly repeated claim suggested Bray was born in Brecknockshire, and was a descendant of the Bishop of Chester, John Wilkins, however, this is impossible, as John Wilkins was born more than four years after Bray.

The prevailing assumption is that Bray came from modern-day Wales; the authors of several historical works on old Salem and New England make significantly similar claims that Bray was a descendant, in varying forms, of the lordly Wilkins families in Wales. William C. Hill states it is "quite likely" that Bray heralded from one of these families, whose presence in Wales is well attested. That being said, Bray's immediate origins are still nonetheless a mystery. "Thorough inquiry" conducted by English and Welsh genealogical authorities have found no definite trace of Bray or his immediate ancestors.

== Immigration and life in Massachusetts ==
Regardless of his origins, Bray arrived in the Thirteen Colonies around 1630, his first residence being recorded as Lynn, Massachusetts. A tradition existed by the mid-twentieth century that Bray had emigrated to the New World with John Endecott, but a lack of extant immigration records from the time period prevents such a connection from being substantiated. The first certain attestation of Bray's presence in the Colonies is a parchment dated January 16, 1632, which describes the allotment of 16 acres of Dorchester to him. He is registered as have taken the Oath of a Freeman on May 14, 1634.

Bray was known by the community as a model citizen: upright, pious, and adored. In 1658, Bray and his partner John Gengell (of uncertain relations, see below) leased 700 acres of land eight to ten miles northwest of Salem, which became the town of Danvers, and later Middleton. Soon afterwards, the two men moved their entire families to the land, and established homesteads. Wilkins and Gengell soon began logging and timber-processing operations, and at first, their business prospered. One of Bray's sons apparently boasted to a friend that the family operation produced 20,000 barrel staves and 6,000 feet of boards, however, in terms of profitability, the operation was marginal. In 1661, Bray was arrested and charged with theft, later admitting to stealing hay in order to feed his oxen with which he transported his timber to Salem. The incident proved embarrassing to the family's reputation, but an even greater setback would occur in 1666. Bray's home had burned down during the winter of 1664, and eventually he and Gengell were unable to continue making their mortgage payments, and were forced to sell two-thirds of their lands. When even this did not allow them to repay their debts, Richard Bellingham, the royal governor of the Massachusetts Colony, brought them to court. Ultimately, Bellingham won his foreclosure judgement, and his lawyers seized Wilkins and Gengell's assets, along with their stocks of shingles. Eventually, Wilkins was able to finally pay off his debts and retain some of his land, but the experience left him with a deep distrust of the court system and a profound belief that farming was the only reliable way to have a secure life.

=== Salem Witch Trials ===
In 1689, Bray and his family, along with several others, moved from Salem proper to establish a church in Danvers. Around 1690, Bray's granddaughter by his son Thomas, Margaret, married a man by the name of John Willard. Willard acted as a constable for the court, and given Bray's legal misfortunes decades prior, the family disapproved of him immediately after it was announced Margaret and John were eloped. The two lived a rather normal life for several years, despite the Wilkins family's indiscrete disapproval of John. During the first weeks of the Salem Witch Trials in spring 1692, paranoia and mania swept through Danvers. Willard, being the constable, was responsible for arresting the accused, but he could not bring himself to arrest townspeople he held in high regard. His refusal to arrest these accused witches lead to himself being accused of witchcraft. Willard became distraught at reports of the accusations leveled against him, and sought out Bray so that he and his family might pray for him. Wilkins, however, informed Willard he was to travel out of town for business later that evening, and asked him to return before nightfall. Willard was unable, and Bray did not honor his request for prayers.

1692 was also an election year for the Massachusetts Bay Colony, during which people travelled to Boston to take part in the primary proceedings – Willard was no exception. Willard was accompanied by his uncle-in-law, Bray's son Henry Wilkins, who detested the claims brought against Willard by the townspeople. After arriving in Boston, Henry invited Willard to join him for supper at Richard Way's homestead in Dorchester, where Bray, his wife, and Deodat Lawson had already gathered. During the meal, Willard apparently gave Bray a cross look, and the patriarch suddenly found himself in a great deal of pain. The condition, probably a kidney stone, forced Bray to remain in Boston for several days. When Willard and Henry Wilkins returned to Salem, Henry's son Daniel was horribly ill. After recovering and returning to Salem as well, Bray's health seemed to relapse into illness upon the news of his grandson's condition. Ann Putnam Jr, Mary Walcott, and Mercy Lewis (with whom Daniel Wilkins was intimate at the time) were called to investigate the possibility of witchcraft, and they affirmed Willard and another Salemite named Sarah Buckley were responsible for the Daniel's fatal illness and Bray's own health problems.

On May 10, a warrant for Willard's arrest was issued. Willard fled to Nashaway, where he was discovered following the issue of a second warrant for his arrest. Willard was put on trial on May 18, during which Bray Wilkins testified of the very painful condition he suffered after the meal with Willard in Dorchester, saying "[Willard] lookt after such a sort upon me as I never before discerned in any." Thomas Wilkins was mortified at the proceedings against his son-in-law, and refused to take part in the trial, however, Bray's other son Benjamin testified that Mercy Lewis had recounted a vision of Willard's "apparition" afflicting the patriarch's stomach, and two of Bray's daughters and several others gave second-hand testimony that John Willard had beaten his wife Margaret and then exhibited odd behavior which frightened her into running to a relative's house for safety. During his examination, Willard denied these allegations with the rest, and desired that his wife would be called to testify on his behalf, but this does not appear to have been done. Indeed, no such frenzy is known to have occurred at any point, Margaret and John shared three children and lived a modest life. Regardless, the testimony of the Wilkins family was damning, and Willard was found guilty and hanged for witchcraft that August.

== Death ==
Bray Wilkins died in January 1702, at age 92. His burial place is not known, though legend places it on the original foundations of Danvers/Middleton that he and Gengell built, today known as "Will's Hill", also where he died.

== Marriage and descendants ==
Bray was only married once, the wedding probably taking place between 1632 and 1636. Per William C. Hill, Bray Wilkins had eight children:

1. Samuel Wilkins Sr. (December 1636 – 20 December 1688)
2. John Wilkins (22 March 1642 – 1723)
3. Lydia Wilkins (25 September 1644 – 1701), who married John Nichols of Topsfield
4. Thomas Wilkins (16 Mar 1647 – October 1717)
5. Margaret Wilkins (12 December 1648 – c. 1697), who married Philip Knight Jr.
6. Henry Wilkins (1 July 1651 – 8 December 1737)
7. Benjamin Wilkins (c. 1656 – 1715)

Hill lists the eighth child as one James Wilkins (c. 1655 – ?), however, it is unlikely James was actually a son of Bray; Bray mentioned neither James nor his heirs in his will, nor did he give James land, as he did his known sons, and no one named "James" was at any time associated with any of Bray's family. John Gengell left legacies to all Bray's children in his will, but James is not mentioned here either.

=== Bray's wife: Hannah Gengell or Hannah Way? ===
The identity of Bray Wilkins' wife is not known with certainty. Any mention of her in surviving documents simply refers to her as "Hannah" or "Anna", with no maiden name ever recorded, and no record of her death is known to exist. In subsequent years, two individuals have been proposed as candidates for Bray Wilkins’ wife: Hannah Way, and Hannah Gengell. Hannah Gengell is proposed to have been the sister of Bray's lifelong partner, John Gengell, while Hannah Way was the daughter of Henry Way, a colonist whose family settled in Dorchester alongside the Wilkins.

William C. Hill's The Family of Bray Wilkins, Patriarch of Will's Hill, states "Bray Wilkins' wife was probably Hannah Gengell. There is no record of the marriage to be found, which probably occurred at Dorchester between 1632 and 1636, for on the latter date Hannah Wilkins, the wife of Bray, is recorded as having been received into the First Church in Dorchester... Hannah Gengell was the sister of John Gengell, one of the incorporators of Taunton, Massachusetts, in 1643." Two persons who had access to much early documentary material about the Wilkins family, now lost, Martha J. Averill and Emily Ann Milliken née Wilkins, maintained that Bray's wife was Hannah Gengell, and furthermore the Wilkins are described with familial kindness in John Gengell’s will dated 10 April 1685.

However, a 1984 article from The American Genealogist written by David L. Greene disputes the identification of Bray's wife as a sister of John Gengell, instead proposing that Bray's wife was the daughter of Henry Way. Though Greene acknowledges that it is difficult to escape the inference that Bray and John Gengell were in some way related, he points out that Henry Way and his family arrived at Nantasket in 1630, meaning he was in New England at the same time as Bray. Secondly, Greene notes that although later documents make it evident that Henry Way had a number of children who were present with the rest of the family when they emigrated to the colony, only Henry and his wife are actually attested in extant emigration records, a fact that severely restricts the usage of such records in determining likely candidates for Bray's spouse. Greene also points out that the notion of Bray's wife, Hannah, originally hailing from the Way family, is seemingly confirmed by later documents. In a document dated to May 1675, one of Henry's sons, Aaron Way, is listed among the "trusty kinsman" to whom Bray was selling land. Likewise, during his testimony against Willard in 1692, Bray explicitly called Richard Way, another of his potential brothers-in-law, his 'brother'. Greene also suggests that Bray’s son ‘Henry’, was intended as to be the namesake of Hannah Way’s father. Although Greene also acknowledges that Bray calling the members of the Way family his "brothers" or "kin" did not require the existence of any actual blood or marital relationship, he points out that the existence of a "Hannah Way" and her status as the daughter of Henry Way is supported by baptismal records in the parish registers for Bridport and Allington in Dorset, where Henry Way and his family lived before emigrating to Massachusetts, whereas no reliable record of a "Hannah Gengell" is able to be found, with John Gengell himself only being sparsely attested to, let alone a hypothetical sister of his.

Clarence Almon Torrey, in his 6,000 page index to what is estimated to be 99% of marriages performed in 17th century New England, asserts that Bray's wife was Hannah Way.
