= Merv Griffin Entertainment =

American production company

- Formerly: Merv Griffin Productions (1996–1998)
- Industry: Television production
- Predecessor: Merv Griffin Enterprises
- Founded: May 13, 1996; 28 years ago
- Founder: Merv Griffin
- Parent: Griffin Group

Merv Griffin Entertainment is an American production company founded by American media mogul Merv Griffin on May 13, 1996. It is part of The Griffin Group. Its productions include revivals of recent franchises, such as Dance Fever, revived in 2003 for ABC Family. Merv Griffin Entertainment owns The Merv Griffin Show (licensed under Reelin' In The Years Productions) and Dance Fever. The television division was run by Yani-Brune Entertainment (Andrew Yani and Ray Brune) from 2005 to 2008; hand-picked by Griffin himself. In 2008, Shine Limited made a deal with Merv Griffin Entertainment to distribute all of MGE programming overseas.

Griffin's previous production company was Merv Griffin Enterprises, which he sold to The Coca-Cola Company on May 5, 1986.

== Television programs ==
- Click (1997–1999)
- The Ainsley Harriott Show (2000)
- Men Are from Mars, Women Are from Venus (2000)
- Dance Fever (2003 revival from the 1979 version; co-produced by Nash Entertainment and Bob Bain Productions)
- Lisa Williams: Life Among the Dead (2006–2008)
- Merv Griffin's Crosswords (2007–2008) (co-produced by Yani-Brune Entertainment; distributed by Program Partners, with ad-sales from NBCUniversal Television Distribution and Sony Pictures Television)
- Lisa Williams: Voices from the Other Side (2008)
- Million Dollar Mind Game (2011)
- It's Worth What? (2011)

== Movies ==
=== Television ===
- Murder at the Cannes Film Festival (2000)
- Inside the Osmonds (2001) (TV)
- Gilda Radner: It's Always Something (2002) (with Touchstone Television) (distributed by Disney-ABC Domestic Television)

=== Theatrical ===
- Shade (2003) (with RKO Pictures; distributed by Dimension Films)
- Rain (2006) (co-produced with Big Headz Entertainment and Lexi Dog Media)
- My One and Only (2009) (co-produced by George Hamilton Productions, Raygun Productions, and Runaway Home Productions; distributed by Freestyle Releasing)
