= Thomas Russell Wilkins =

Canadian physicist (1891–1940)

Thomas Russell Wilkins (6 June 1891, Toronto – 10 December 1940, Rochester, New York) was a Canadian physicist.

Wilkins received in 1912 his bachelor's degree in physics from McMaster University (which was then located in Toronto). He began graduate study in physics at the University of Chicago and taught at Brandon College, where he was head of the department of mathematics and physics from 1918 to 1925. In 1921 he received his PhD from the University of Chicago with his thesis Multiple valency in the ionization by alpha rays. In 1924 he was an Invited Speaker at the ICM in 1924 in Toronto.

He spent one year, 1925–1926, at the Cavendish Laboratory at Cambridge, England. In 1926 he joined the Physics Department of the University of Rochester in New York. In 1928 he was appointed director of the Institute of Optics. He died in Rochester on 10 December 1940. Wilkins secured photographic recordings of cosmic rays and the disintegration of radium atoms.

== Selected publications ==
- "The Actinium Series and the Lead Ratios in Rocks." Nature 117 (1926): 719–720. doi:10.1038/117719b0
- with W. M. Rayton: "Isotopes of Uranium." Nature 130 (1932): 475–476. doi:10.1038/130475b0
- with H. St Helens: "Direct photographic tracks of atomic cosmic-ray corpuscles." Physical Review 49, no. 5 (1936): 403. doi:10.1103/PhysRev.49.403
- "The response of photographic materials to atomic particles." Journal of Applied Physics 11, no. 1 (1940): 35–45. doi:10.1063/1.1712705
- "Excited States of Stable Nuclei." Nature 146 (1940): 401–401. doi:10.1038/146401a0
- "Scattering of Protons by Magnesium and Aluminum." Physical Review 60, no. 5 (1941): 365. doi:10.1103/PhysRev.60.365
