= Jacques Wilkins =

Jacques Wilkins is a Quebec public relations advisor. He is a partner at Communications André Bouthillier, a Montreal public relations firm.

Wilkins served as the communication director for former premier of Quebec Bernard Landry from 2001 to 2003. Prior to that, he was deputy minister at the Quebec ministry of health and social services, and held communications positions with a number of health services organizations.
