= John Willard =

17th-century man convicted of witchcraft (died 1692)

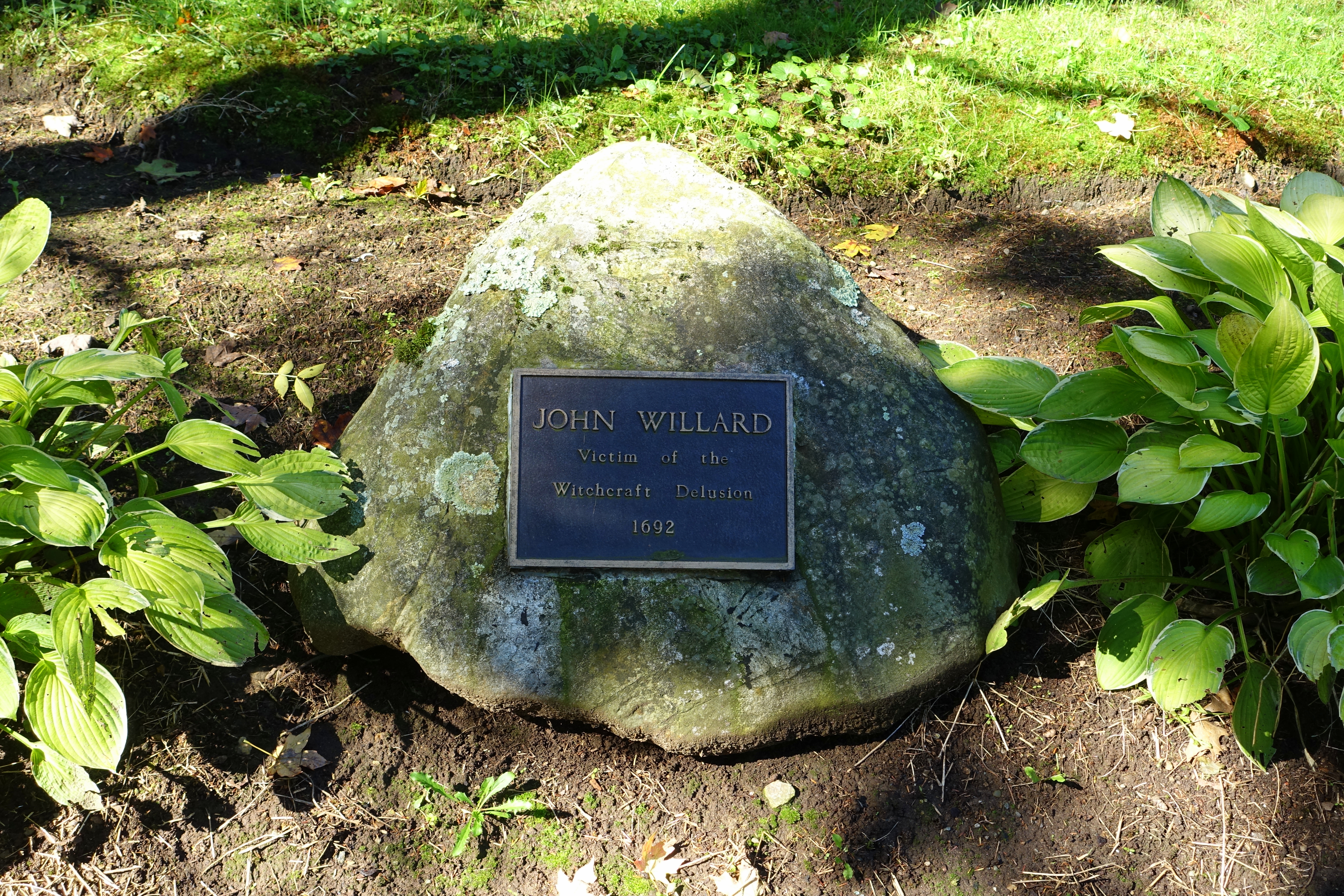
- Memorial to John Willard
- Born: 1657?
- Died: c. August 19, 1692 (aged 34–35); Salem Village, Province of Massachusetts Bay
- Occupation: Constable
- Known for: Convicted of witchcraft in the Salem witch trials
- Status: Executed by hanging
- Conviction: Witchcraft
- Penalty: Death

John Willard (c. 1657 – August 19, 1692) was one of the people executed for witchcraft in Salem, Massachusetts, during the Salem witch trials. He was hanged on Proctor's ledge, Salem on August 19, 1692.

At the time of the first allegations of witchcraft Willard was serving as a constable in the village of Salem and his duties included bringing the accused before the court. Soon, however, he began to doubt the truth of the accusations and in May 1692 he refused to make any more arrests. In retaliation Ann Putnam, Jr. and others accused him of witchcraft, and of murdering thirteen citizens.

Some of Willard's in-laws, the Wilkins, also made accusations against him. Benjamin Wilkins would tell the court that Willard had previously beat his wife, Samuel Wilkins testified that he had repeatedly been irritated and afflicted by an entity in a dark colored coat he identified as Willard. John Wilkins would blame the death of his wife, after having delivered a baby, on John Willard, and the family patriarch, Bray Wilkins, would say that he came down with an illness after John Willard had looked at him with an evil eye. Willard was found guilty of witchcraft on August 5, 1692. On August 19, 1692, he was hanged, along with John Proctor, George Burroughs, George Jacobs, Sr., and Martha Carrier. Willard maintained his innocence until the very end.

== Early life ==
Most of the information on John Willard's early life is relatively obscure. However, most scholars conclude that he probably came from Lancaster, Massachusetts, and he was born in 1657. Indeed, it was Lancaster, then called Nashaway, where Willard fled to after being accused of witchcraft. During his youth John Willard lived in Lancaster and worked under a Major Simon Willard, one of the most prominent Massachusetts land speculators of the mid-seventeenth century. Given the shared surname, some scholars have concluded that Simon and John were kinsmen, usually positing that John was either the son, or grandson of Major Willard. "The Pioneers of Massachusetts, 1620-1650", as well as vital records and shows Major Simon Willard and his wife, Mary Dunster, having a son named John in 1656/7; however, this son died in Concord in 1726.

== Relationship with the Wilkins Family ==
The Wilkins disapproved of John Willard immediately after Margaret Wilkins decided to marry him. This was partly due to Willard's chosen profession and the failure of a business venture by Bray Wilkins decades earlier, which had led to him selling 2/3 of his land holdings and very narrowly holding out on a court-ordered foreclosure of the remaining third. Thus, seeing one of his daughters marry a man who had interest in land speculation, made him uneasy.

== Relationship with the Putnams ==
Initially after arriving at Salem Village, John Willard worked as a hired hand on the Putnam farm. One of his many tasks on the farm was looking after the young children living there. Ann Putnam, Sr. had recently given birth to a baby girl and Willard was usually asked to watch the infant. However, the infant, who was named Sarah, would die after a few months. The distraught parents would blame Willard for her untimely death. Despite this, the Putnams did not let the conflict affect their relationship with rest of the Wilkins clan. The Putnams and the Wilkins shared many similarities and experiences. Both families would band together in an attempt to break away from Salem Town and establish their own church in the village, and both families suffered setbacks from failed mercantile enterprises.

== Accusations ==
Towards the end of April, after Willard had abandoned his post as a constable and publicly doubted the girls' accusations, Ann Putnam Jr. began to see visions of John Willard's specter. Willard's specter would reveal to her his culpability in several murders. Ann Jr. claimed that she told the apparition of John Willard: "I am very sorry to see you so. You were the one that helped to tend me, and now you have come to afflict me." During her testimony, she would claim that Willard "sett upon me most dreadfully" and had admitted to her that "he had whiped my little sister Sarah to death and he would whip me to death if I would not write in his book." Ann Jr. would later see the apparition of her dead sister Sarah who was "crieing out for vengance against John Willard" along with the specter of "John Wilkins' first wife" who also declared that Willard had caused her death (Lydia, the wife of John Wilkins, the cousin of Willard's wife Margaret, had died in January 1688)

After hearing about these disturbing reports, Willard would seek help from his wife's grandfather, Bray Wilkins. Wilkins would later testify that Willard, after Ann Jr. began to accuse him, "came my house greatly troubled" and wanted him and other villagers to pray for him. Wilkins would tell his grandson-in-law that, unfortunately, he was on his way out of town for business, but if Willard would come home before night then he would pray with him. Willard however was unable to make it before night and Wilkins would not honor the request for prayers. On Tuesday May 3, 1692, Willard asked his uncle-in-law Henry Wilkins (one of Bray's sons) to accompany him to Boston for election week. Henry's son, Daniel Wilkins, who was seeing Mercy Lewis at the time, warned his father not to go with Willard saying "It would be well if Willard were hanged". Henry was taken aback by the comment, and decided to go with Willard. At the same time Willard and Henry Wilkins were planning on going to Boston, Bray Wilkins had also made plans to travel there and was staying at his brother-in-law's house. Typically, many family members would meet there for dinner, and on one of those nights Willard and Henry Wilkins would arrive. Upon Willard's entry to the home, Bray would later testify that "Willard looked upon me in such a sort as I have never before discerned in anybody." Bray continued to suffer painful attacks throughout the day "I cannot express the misery I was in, for my water was suddenly stopped, and i had no benefit of nature, but was like a man on a rack". He told his wife "I am afraid that Willard has done me wrong". Meanwhile, in Salem Village, Daniel Wilkins had also fallen ill. Dr. William Griggs, who was attending young Daniel, apparently "affirmed that his sickness was by some preternatural cause, and would make no application of any physic". Mercy Lewis, a prolific accuser during the Witch Trials who was also there, affirmed that she saw "the apparition of John Willard" afflicting Daniel. Quickly afterwards, another infamous accuser, Ann Putnam Jr., claimed she had also seen the same apparition attacking Daniel. Soon after this episode, Bray's son, Benjamin Wilkins Sr. took legal action, and charged John Willard with afflicting Bray and Daniel Wilkins. An arrest warrant would soon be issued for John Willard.

== Arrest ==
On May 11, 1692, a warrant was issued for the arrest of John Willard. John Putnam Jr., a constable who would search for Willard, reported that "I went to the house of the usual abode of John Willard and made search for him, and in several other houses and places but could not find him." John Willard had fled, and had escaped to Lancaster. After Willard's escape, Bray Wilkins returned to his home in Salem Village. Once Wilkins arrived home, some friends came to see him, including the afflicted Mercy Lewis. Lewis told Wilkins that she saw the apparition of John Willard on Wilkins' belly. Upon hearing this, Wilkins stated that he was in "grievous pain in the small of my belly". Lewis also stated that she saw Willard's apparition attacking Daniel Wilkins and "John Willard tells me he will kill him within two days." Mercy's prediction came true, and two days later on May 16, 1692, Daniel Wilkins died. A second arrest warrant for Willard was issued. A short time afterwards, Putnam Jr. caught John Willard attending to his meadows in Lancaster, and brought him back to Salem Village.

== Interrogation and Hanging ==
Once Willard was in custody, he was brought forth to undergo his examination. On May 18, 1692, the magistrates began to castigate him for fleeing by saying "That you were fled from Authority....is an acknowledgment of guilt....but yet notwithstanding we require you to confess the truth in this matter." Willard admitted that he believed "by my withdrawing it might be better", but also proclaimed that he was innocent. The magistrates confronted him with testimonies not only from the current afflictions that were happening in the village, but also the dreadful murders he had been charged with, reading to him statements from Mercy Lewis, Ann Putnam Jr., and Susannah Sheldon. Other witnesses would also come forward and attack his character. Benjamin Wilkins Sr, testified that Willard "abused his wife much & broke sticks about her in beating of her." Another man stated that Willard was "very cruel to poor creatures." After hearing this, Willard asked that his wife be called so that she can refute the charges, however, the justices denied his request. The justices next employed physical tests. When Susannah Shelton was asked to approach Willard she fell down immediately and explained that she could not go towards Willard because "the black man stood between us." Willard then took her hand, which drew no effect from Susannah. Next, Mary Warren was brought to Willard in a "great fit" he then clasped his hand upon her arm and she recovered from her fits. Willard, noticing the contradiction, asked the justices "why....was it not before so with Susannah Sheldon?" Those standing by would answer his question by claiming "because...you did not clasp your hand before."

At the close of his examination, the justices asked Willard to recite the Lord's prayer, which he could not do. Willard "laught" nervously and said "it is a strange thing, I can say it at another time. I think I am bewitcht as well as they," finally he declared "it is these wicked ones that do so overcome me." On August 5, 1692, John Willard was sentenced to death by hanging and on August 19, Willard along with George Burroughs, John Proctor, George Jacobs Sr, and Martha Carrier were hanged on Gallow's hill.
