= Wilkins =

Wilkins or Wilkin is a name variant of William, and may refer to:

== People ==
=== Given name: Wilkin ===
- Wilkin Castillo (born 1984), Dominican baseball catcher
- Wilkin Formby (born 2005), American football player
- Wilkin Mota (born 1981), Indian cricketer
- Wilkin Ramírez (born 1985), Dominican baseball outfielder
- Wilkin Ruan (born 1978), Dominican baseball outfielder

=== Given name: Wilkins ===
- Wilkins (singer) (Germán Wilkins Vélez Ramírez, born 1953), Puerto Rican pop music singer and composer
- Wilkins P. Horton (1889–1950), American lawyer, lieutenant governor of North Carolina 1937–1941
- Wilkins Micawber, character in Charles Dickens's novel David Copperfield
- Wilkins F. Tannehill (1787–1858), American politician and author

=== Surname ===
- Wilkin (surname)
- Wilkins (surname)

== Places and geographical features ==
- Edness K. Wilkins State Park, a state park in Wyoming
- Fort Wilkins Historic State Park, a historical location in Michigan
- Wilkins Coast, a portion of the eastern coast of Antarctica
- Wilkin County, Minnesota
- Wilkins (crater), a crater on the Moon
- Wilkins Gulch, a valley in California
- Wilkins Ice Shelf, an ice shelf located in Wilkins Sound
- Wilkins Island, an Island in Antarctica
- Wilkins Peak, a small mountain in Wyoming
- Wilkins Sound, an island sound off the coast of the Antarctic Peninsula
- Wilkins Strait (Canada), a waterway in northern Canada
- Wilkins Township, Allegheny County, Pennsylvania

== Structures ==
- Glover Wilkins Lock, a lock in Mississippi
- Roy Wilkins Auditorium, an arena in Minnesota
- Wilkins Mill Covered Bridge, an American historic bridge
- Wilkins Public School, an Australian school
- Wilkins Runway, an aerodrome in Antarctica

== Business ==
- Wilkins Lecture, a series of lectures led by the Royal Society of London
- Wilkin & Sons, an English manufacturer of preserves and associated products
- Wilkins Coffee, a Washington DC–based coffee company, best known for its commercials starring the Muppet characters Wilkins and Wontkins.

== See also ==
- Wilken
- Wilkens
- Wilkins House (disambiguation)
- Justice Wilkin (disambiguation)
- Justice Wilkins (disambiguation)
