= Wilkes =

Wilkes may refer to:

== Places ==
- Wilkes, Portland, Oregon, a US neighborhood
- Wilkes County, Georgia
- Wilkes County, North Carolina
- Wilkes Basin, George V Land, Antarctica
- Wilkes Station, Antarctica, a research station
- Battery Wilkes, a historic artillery battery in West Ashley, Charleston, South Carolina
- Wilkes Power Plant, Jefferson, Texas, an electrical power station
- Wilkes Island, islet of Wake Island in the Central Pacific.

== Schools in the United States ==
- Wilkes University, Pennsylvania
- Wilkes Community College, Wilkesboro, North Carolina
- Wilkes Honors College, Florida

== People ==
- John Wilkes, English radical journalist and politician in the late 18th century.
- Wilkes (surname), other people with the surname
- Wilkes Angel (1817–1889), New York lawyer and politician
- Wilkes C. Robinson (1925–2015), judge of the United States Court of Federal Claims from 1987 to 1997

== Other uses ==
- USS Wilkes, several US Navy vessels
- Wilkes (horse) (born 1952), Australian thoroughbred

== See also ==
- Wilk
- Wilken
- Wilkens
- Wilkes Land, Antarctica
  - Clarie Coast, called Wilkes Coast in Australia
- Wilkes-Barre, Pennsylvania, a city
- Wilkes-Barre Township, Luzerne County, Pennsylvania
- Wilkes-Barre Variation, a chess opening
- Wilks (disambiguation)
