= Wilkes (surname) =

Wilkes is a surname of English origin, a variant of the name William. Notable people with the surname include:

- Albert Wilkes (1874–1936), English sports photographer and football player
- Alice Wilkes, lady in waiting to Queen Katherine Howard
- Alexander Wilkes (1900–1937), English cricketer
- Ally Wilkes, English author
- Belinda Wilkes, English astrophysicist
- Benjamin Wilkes (died c.1749), British entomological painter
- Brent A. Wilkes, executive director of the League of United Latin American Citizens
- Brent R. Wilkes (born 1954), American defense contractor
- Carissa Wilkes (born 1986), New Zealand road cyclist
- Cathy Wilkes (born 1966), Northern Ireland artist
- Charles Wilkes (banker) (1764–1833), British born American banker
- Charles Wilkes (1798–1877), American naval officer and explorer
- Dave Wilkes (born 1964), English professional football player
- Debbi Wilkes (born 1946), Canadian figure skater and author
- Del Wilkes (born 1961), American wrestler
- Donald E. Wilkes Jr. (1944–2019), American legal scholar
- Donna Wilkes (born 1959), American film actress
- Faas Wilkes (1923–2006), Dutch football player
- Frank Wilkes (1922–2015), Australian politician
- Frederick Wilkes (1869–after 1892), English football player
- Fred Wilkes (1883–1942), English football player
- George Wilkes (1817–1885), American journalist and newspaper editor
- Glenn Wilkes Sr. (1928–2020), American college basketball coach and author
- Glenn Wilkes Jr. (born 1958), American college basketball player and coach
- Ian Wilkes (born 1965), Australian racehorse trainer in the US
- India Wilkes, fictional character in American novel and film Gone with the Wind
- J. D. Wilkes (born 1972), American musician
- Jamaal Wilkes (born 1953), American basketball player, formerly Keith Wilkes
- James Wilkes (disambiguation), several people
- Jane Renwick Smedburg Wilkes (1827–1913), American nurse and philanthropist
- Joanne Wilkes (born 1956), New Zealand professor of English literature
- John Wilkes (disambiguation), several people
- Jon Wilkes (born 1985), American drummer
- Jonathan Wilkes (born 1978), English television presenter, actor and musician
- Joseph Wilkes (1733–1805), English industrialist and agricultural improver
- Justin Wilkes, British film producer
- Kathy Wilkes (1946–2003), English philosopher and academic
- Kris Wilkes (born 1998), American basketball player
- Lyall Wilkes (1914–1991), English historian, judge and politician
- Marjorie Wilkes (born 1889), American librarian, inker, and comic book letterer
- Mary Allen Wilkes (born 1937), American computer programmer and hardware engineer
- Maurice Wilkes (1913–2010), British computer scientist
- Maya Wilkes, fictional character in American TV sitcom Girlfriends
- Melanie Wilkes, fictional character in American novel and film Gone with the Wind
- Michael Wilkes (1940–2013), British army general
- Oliver Wilkes (born 1980), British rugby player
- Oren Wilkes (born 1988), American fashion model and blogger
- Owen Wilkes (1940–2005), New Zealand peace campaigner
- Paget Wilkes (1871–1934), English missionary in Japan
- Paul Wilkes (born 1938), American author on Catholicism
- Peter Singleton Wilkes (1827–1900), American Confederate politician
- Reggie Wilkes (born 1956), American football player
- Rich Wilkes (born 1966), American filmmaker
- Richard Wilkes (16th century), English priest and academic
- Richard Wilkes (antiquarian) (1691–1760), English physician and antiquarian
- Robert Wilkes (1832–1880), Irish-Canadian politician and businessman
- Robert Wilkes (priest) (born 1948), Church of England priest
- Rodney Wilkes (1925–2014), Trinidadian weightlifter
- Sam Wilkes (born 1991), American bassist
- Sarah Wilkes (born 1990), Canadian curler
- Sema Wilkes (1907–2002), business owner and writer
- Stephen Wilkes, American photographer
- Steve Wilkes (born 1967), English football player
- T. M. Wilkes (1888–1958), Controller of Civil Aviation in New Zealand
- Thomas Wilkes (Chippenham MP) (by 1508–1536/37), English politician
- Thomas Wilkes (c.1545–1598), English civil servant and diplomat
- Tom Wilkes (footballer) (1874–1921), English football player
- Tom Wilkes (1939–2009), American art director, designer, photographer, illustrator, writer and producer-director
- William Wilkes (1865–1940), English cricketer

== Fictional characters ==
- Annie Wilkes, fictional character in the Stephen King novel and film Misery
- Ashley Wilkes, fictional character in American novel and film Gone with the Wind
- Sergeant Wilkes, fictional character in the film, Dracula's Daughter

== See also ==
- Wilks
- Wilke
- Weelkes
