= Wilkens =

Wilkens is a surname. Notable people with the surname include:

- Andrea Wilkens (born 1984), German footballer
- Ann Wilkens (born 1944), Swedish former journalist, diplomat and ambassador
- April Rose Wilkens (born 1970), American convicted murderer who tried to use "battered woman syndrome" as a defense
- Carl Wilkens (born 1958), American involved in Rwandan genocide rescue efforts
- Elmer Wilkens (1901–1967), American football player
- Emily Wilkens (1917–2000), American fashion designer and writer
- Henry Wilkens (1855–1895), American Medal of Honor recipient
- Iman Wilkens (1936-2018), author of Where Troy Once Stood
- Jan Wilkens (born 1943), South African professional wrestler
- Lenny Wilkens (1937–2025), American basketball player and coach
- Leo Wilkens (1893–1967), Swedish rowing coxswain
- May Britt (born 1934), Swedish actress born May Britt Wilkens
- Piter Wilkens (born 1959), Dutch musician
- Sophia Wilkens (1817–1889), Swedish pedagogue, a pioneer in the education of students with intellectual disability and the deaf and mute
- Theodoor Wilkens (1690–1748), painter from the Northern Netherlands
- Tom Wilkens (born 1975), American swimmer

== See also ==
- 1688 Wilkens, a main-belt asteroid
- Automotive Tooling Systems v Wilkens, a legal case in South African labour law
- Wilken
- Wilkins
- Wickens
- Wilkes
