= Vilčinskas =

- Lithuanian surname
- m.: Vilčinskas
- f.: (unmarried): Vilčinskaitė
- f.: (married): Vilčinskienė

Vilčinskas is a Lithuanian surname derived from the Polish surname Wilczyński. Notable people with the surname include:

- Jonas Vilčinskas (1930–1953), Lithuanian soldier
- Raimondas Vilčinskas (born 1977), Lithuanian cyclist
