= Winkens =

Winkens is a surname. Notable people with the surname include:

- Elke Winkens (born 1970), Austrian-German actress
- Sjoerd Winkens (born 1983), Dutch footballer

== See also ==
- Wickens
