= Wilks (disambiguation) =

Wilks is a surname.

Wilks may also refer to:

- another name for Cittarium pica, the Caribbean sea snail
- Wilks Broadcasting, an American media company
- Wilks Memorial Award, awarded by the American Statistical Association

== See also ==
- Wilkes (disambiguation)
- Wilk (disambiguation)
