= Wilk (disambiguation) =

Wilk is a surname.

Wilk may also refer to:

== In the military ==
- Wilk class submarine of the Polish Navy
- ORP Wilk (1929), the lead boat of the Wilk class, launched in 1929
- ORP Wilk (292), a Polish Foxtrot class submarine, launched in 1987
- PZL.38 Wilk, prototype of a fighter-bomber
- WKW Wilk, sniper rifle
- T-72 Wilk, a Polish variant of the T-72 tank

== Radio stations ==
- WILK (AM), licensed to Wilkes-Barre, Pennsylvania
- WILK-FM, licensed to Avoca, Pennsylvania

== Other uses ==
- Wilk Elektronik, a Polish computer memory manufacturer
- "The Wilk" a colloquial name for the Ernest L. Wilkinson Student Center in Provo, Utah, United States
- "General Wilk" (1895–1951), nom de guerre of Aleksander Krzyzanowski

== See also ==
- Wilks (disambiguation)
- Whelk modern spelling of the sea shell Wilk
