= Burcham =

Burcham could refer to:

- Bob Burcham (1935–2009), American NASCAR driver
- David W. Burcham (b. 1951), President of Loyola Marymount University
- Margaret W. Burcham, US Army Corps of Engineers general
- Milo Burcham (1903–44), American aviator
- Rose La Monte Burcham (1859–1944), American medical doctor and mining executive
- Scott Burcham (b. 1993), American-Israeli baseball player
