= Mike Wilks =

Mike Wilks is the name of:

- Mike Wilks (basketball) (born 1979), NBA basketball player
- Mike Wilks (author), author of The Ultimate Alphabet and Mirrorscape

== See also ==
- Michael Wilk (born 1952), American musician
- Michael Wilkes (1940–2013), adjutant-general to the Forces in the United Kingdom
- Michael Wilks (born 1973), Australian lawn bowler
