= Highland Park Masonic Temple =

- U.S. National Register of Historic Places
- Los Angeles Historic-Cultural Monument
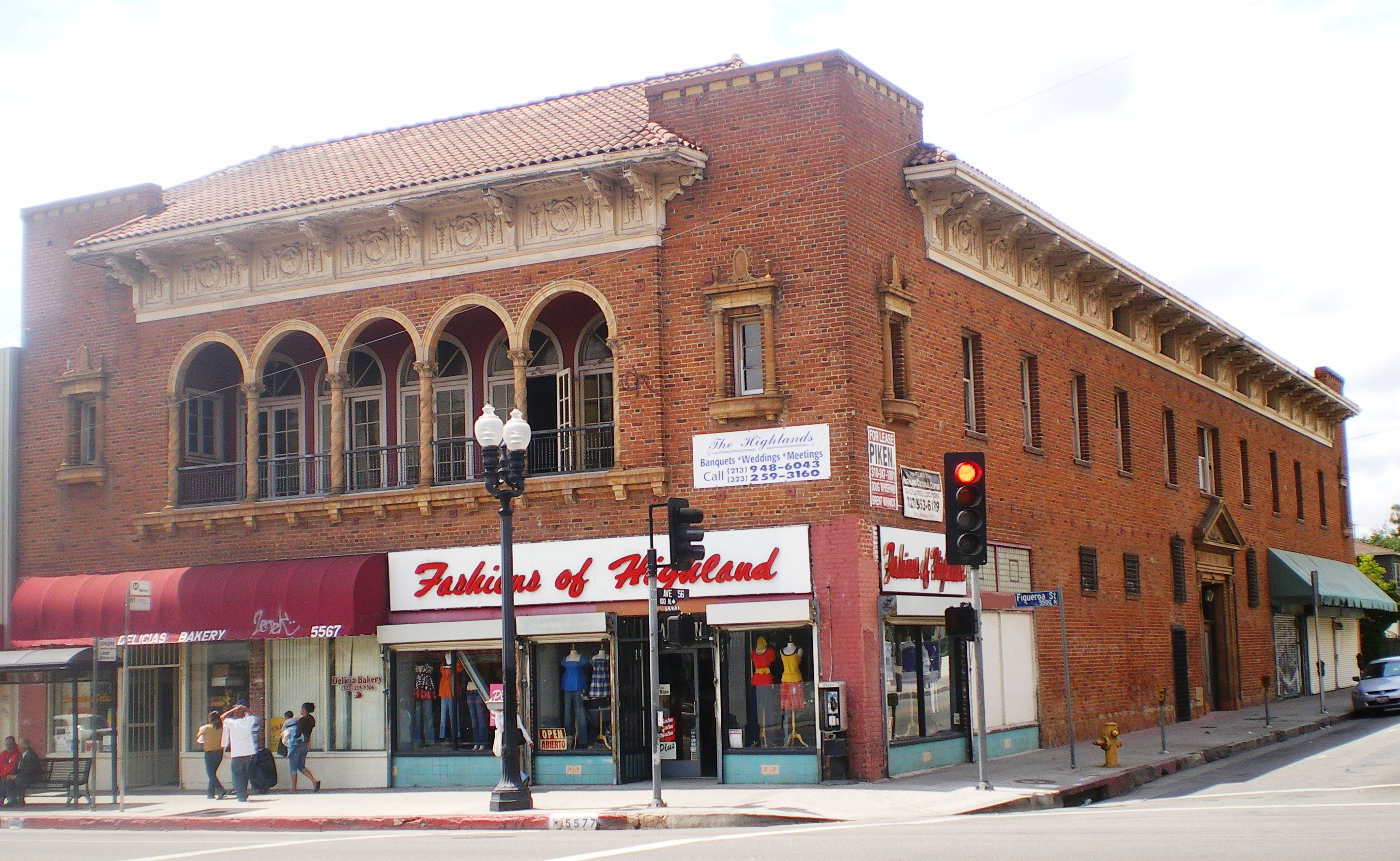
- Highland Park Masonic Temple, 2008

- Location within the Los Angeles metropolitan area Location within California Location within the United States
- Location: 104 N. Avenue 56, Highland Park, Los Angeles, California
- Coordinates: 34°6′33″N 118°11′40.2″W
- Built: 1922–1923
- Architect: Elmore Robinson Jeffrey
- Architectural style: Renaissance Revival, Mediterranean Revival
- NRHP reference No.: 89002268
- LAHCM No.: 282

Significant dates
- Added to NRHP: January 18, 1990
- Designated LAHCM: August 29, 1984

The Highland Park Masonic Temple, also known as The Mason Building or The Highlands, is a historic three-story brick building on Figueroa Street in the Highland Park district of northeast Los Angeles, California.

== History ==
Completed in 1923, the 'Commercial/Renaissance Revival' style building served as Lodge 382 of the Free and Accepted Masons for sixty years. The original structure included retail shops on the ground floor with the lodge and banquet hall on the second floor. In 1983, the Masons were forced to vacate the structure when they were unable to afford the cost of retrofitting the building to meet seismic safety requirements. The building was purchased by private developers, and the second floor was converted into a banquet facility. The original Lodge Room, with its cherry wood paneling, anaglypta wall coverings, and other details has been restored and preserved and remains in use, now as a namesake 500 capacity music venue, Lodge Room.

=== Architecture and construction ===
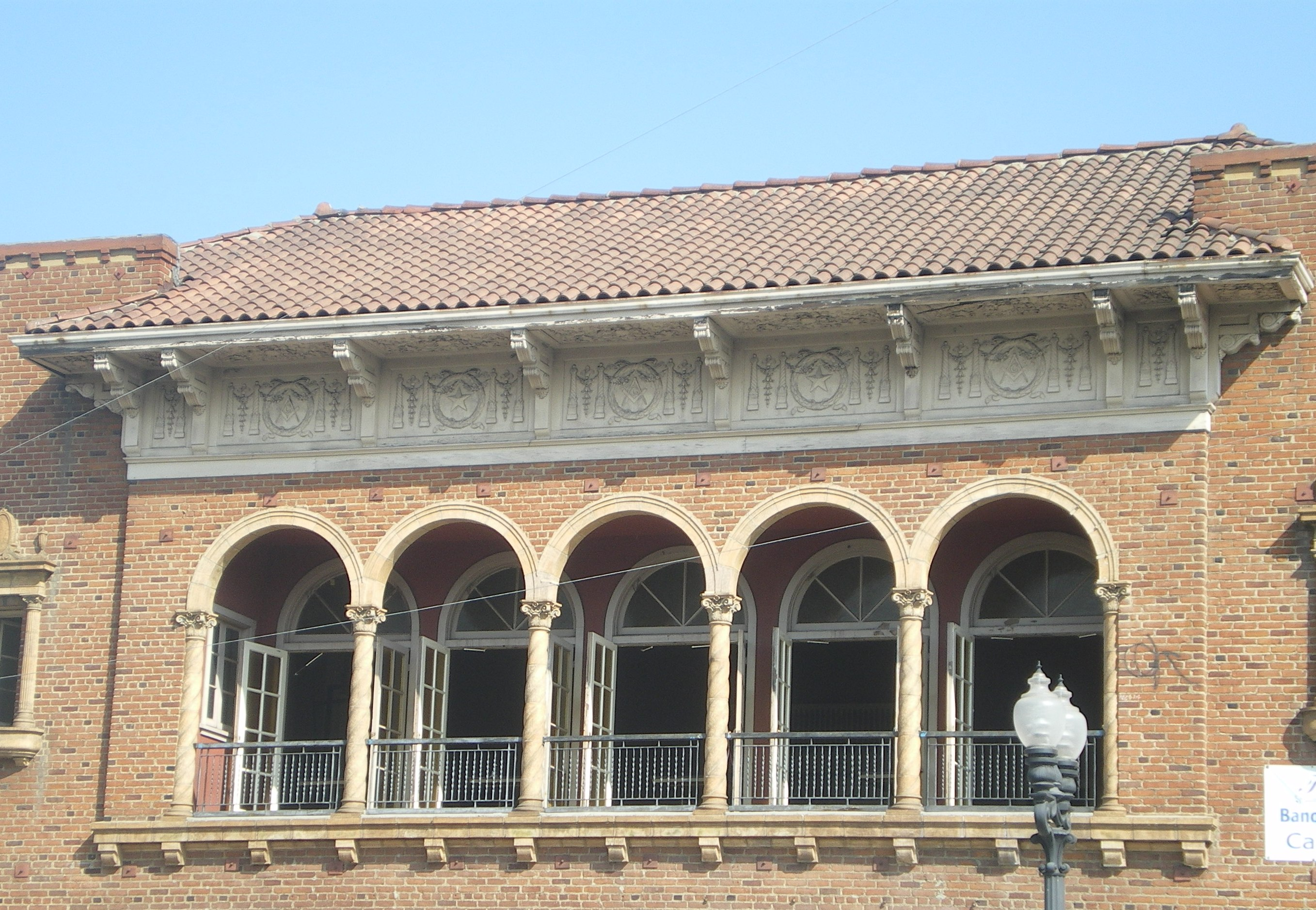
Figueroa Street arcade balcony

The building was designed by Elmore Robinson Jeffrey in the Renaissance Revival style with much of the architectural detailing in the Mediterranean Revival style. Jeffrey was a Mason and donated the plans to his Lodge, for which he served as the Worshipful Master in 1928. The 'Commercial/Renaissance Revival' style was popular in Los Angeles during the 1920s.

The 25,000-square-foot (2,300 m^{2}) Highland Park Masonic Temple was built from 1922 to 1923 and opened in July 1923. The three-story structure was built for use by the Free and Accepted Masons as the hall for Highland Park Masonic Lodge No. 382. The Masons occupied the second and third floors, and the first floor was retail space, providing an income source for the lodge.

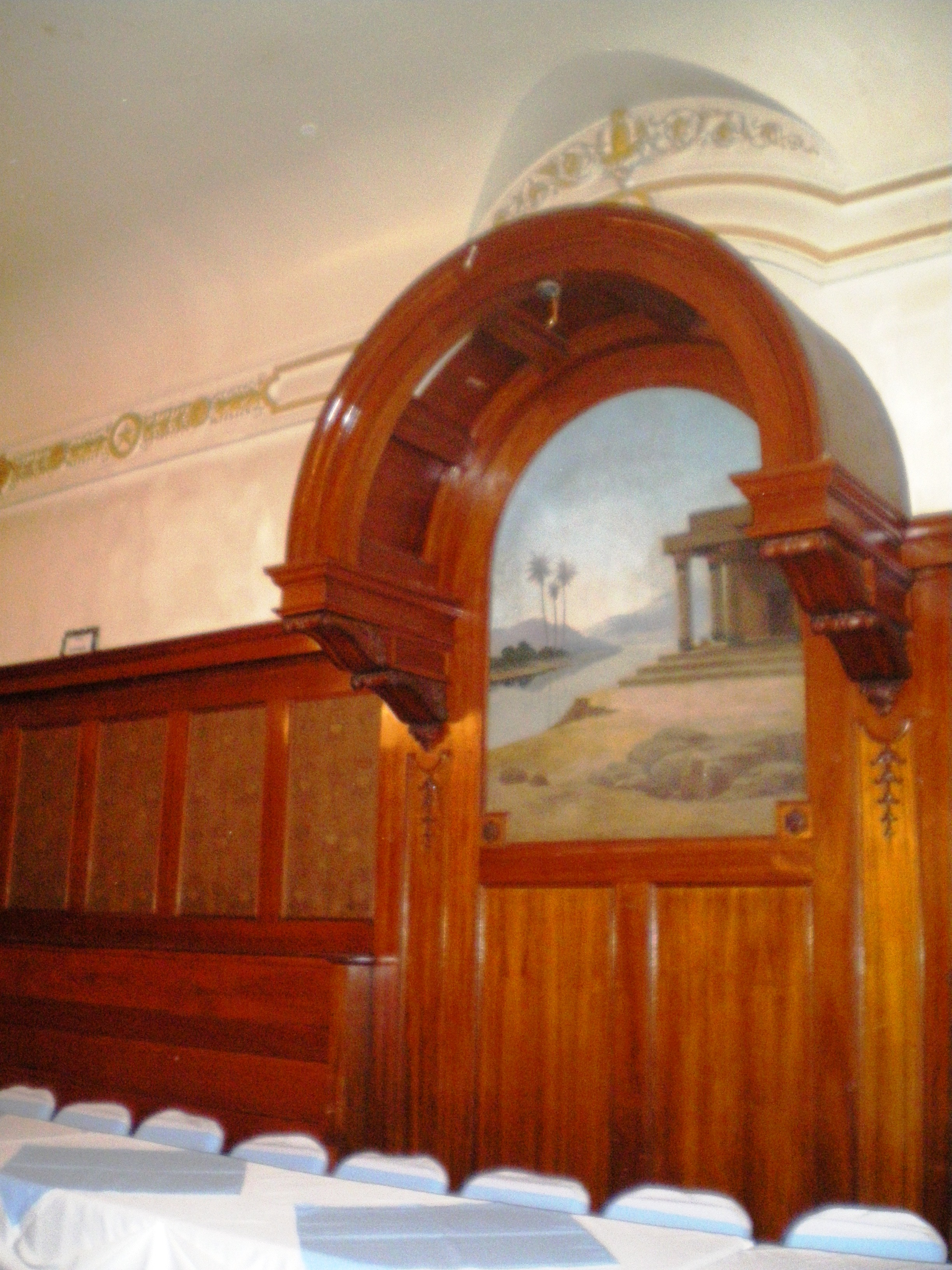
Anaglypta along south wall of the Lodge Room

The most impressive room in the building is the Lodge Room on the second floor. The Lodge Room has an 18-foot (5.5 m) ceiling and rich cherry wood paneling, original embossed cotton anaglypta, and paintings at both ends of the hall depicting Egyptian scenes, including a sphinx and pyramid. There was originally a third-story arched balcony/arcade visually connecting the Lodge Room with the Banquet Hall. However, there was a hallway between the two arched rooms which was to prevent any audible Lodge proceedings from being overheard in the banquet room during a tiled meeting.

Other significant architectural features include a beautiful frieze featuring Masonic symbols running along the exterior roofline of the building along Figueroa Street and Avenue 56. From the exterior, the most impressive feature is the Figueroa Street facade with its columns and balcony at the eastern edge of the Banquet Hall.

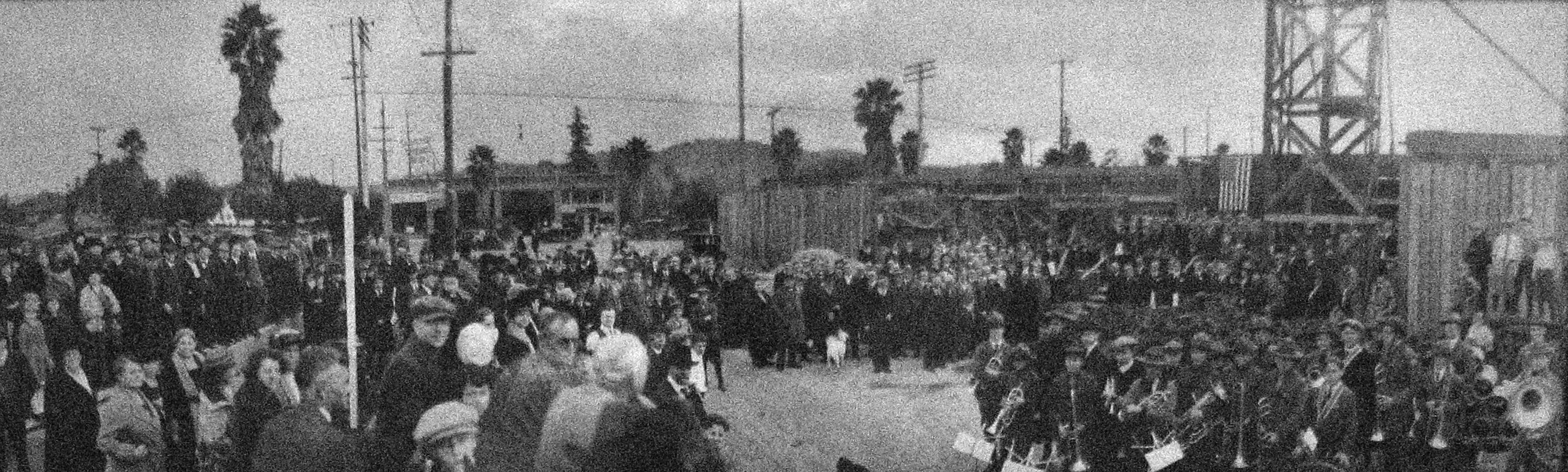
The cornerstone for the Highland Park Masonic Temple was laid with great fanfare on December 16, 1922.

== Use of the building ==
=== Masonic Lodge 382 ===
The Masons used the building under Highland Park Lodge No. 382 for 60 years from 1923 to 1983. A second Lodge, Garvanza Lodge No. 492, also met in the building for many years. There were also two chapters for the Order of the Eastern Star, as well as three Masonic youth groups, Highland Park Bethel No. 66, Job's Daughters International, Highland Park Assembly No. 213, International Order of the Rainbow for Girls and Highland Park Chapter, Order of DeMolay for teenage boys. The Lodge, which was chartered in 1906, merged with East Gate Lodge No. 290 (chartered in 1888) that met in nearby Lincoln Heights in 1982 but continued to meet in the Highland Park building under the name of Fellowship Lodge No. 290. However, in 1983, the owners were cited for failure to bring the building up to modern seismic safety standards under Division 88 of the Los Angeles Building Code. The Masonic Temple Association lacked the funds to undertake the expensive seismic work and were forced to vacate and sell the building. Garvanza Lodge consolidated with Fellowship Lodge in 1983. The Eastern Star chapters having already merged had moved to the Atwater Masonic Temple. The DeMolay Chapter moved to the Eagle Rock Masonic Temple and the two girls bodies disbanded in Highland Park. The Lodge itself, after meeting at the East Gate Temple for nine years, consolidated with South Pasadena Lodge No. 367 in 1992 and presently remains active as South Pasadena Lodge No. 290.

=== Renovation as a mixed use and banquet facility ===
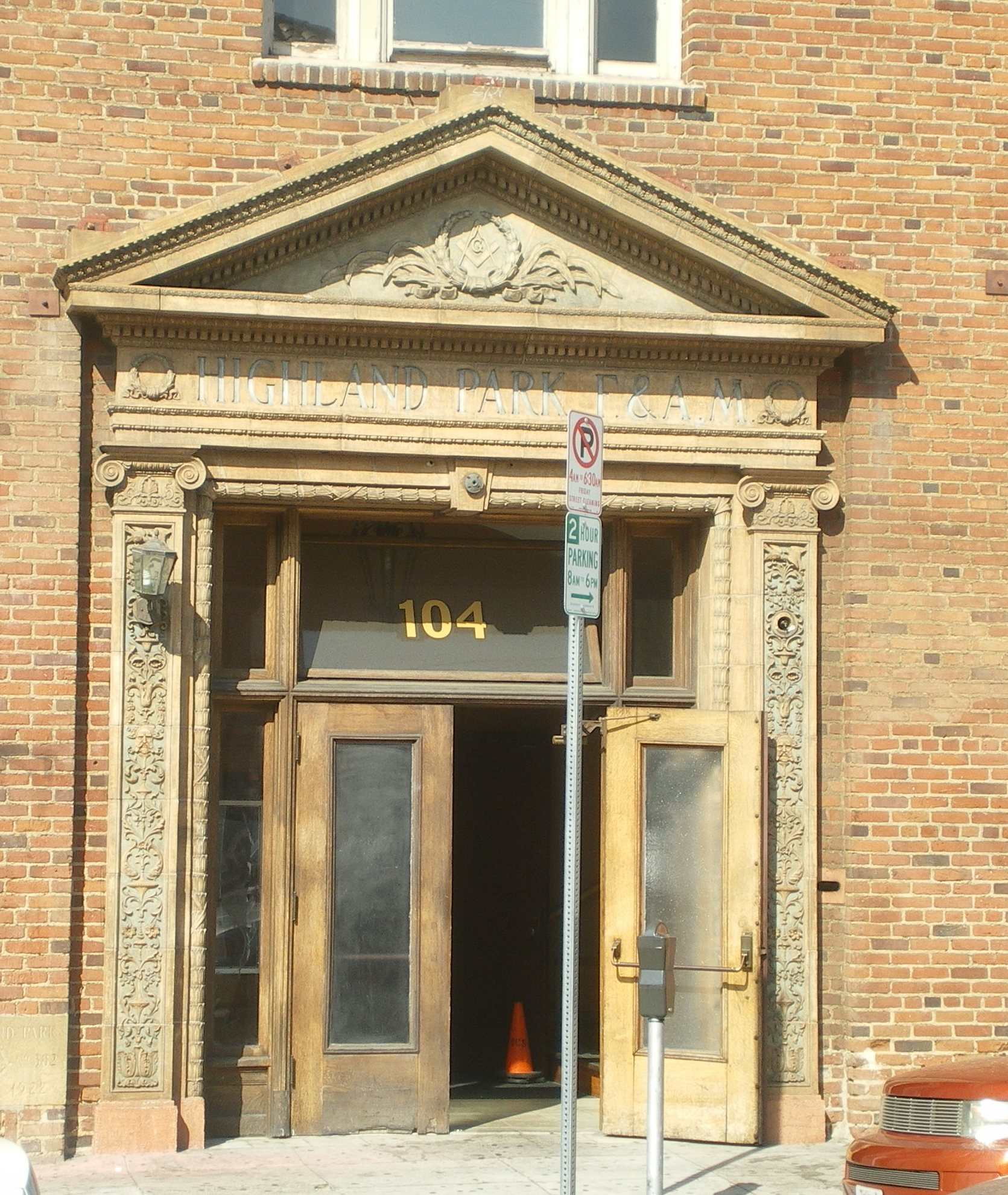
Main Entrance along Avenue 56

In 1983, Allen Golden, along with partners Jerry Sullivan and Jerry Manpearl, purchased the building. They undertook extensive renovation of the building between 1985 and 1989, including upgrade work to enable the structure to meet modern seismic safety requirements. As part of the renovation work, the owners replaced awnings that had been part of the original design, and leaded glass that had been covered was exposed. Additionally, during the seismic retrofit, care was taken to preserve numerous period details, including doorknobs embossed with Masonic symbols, the cherry wood paneling and the anaglypta wall covering.

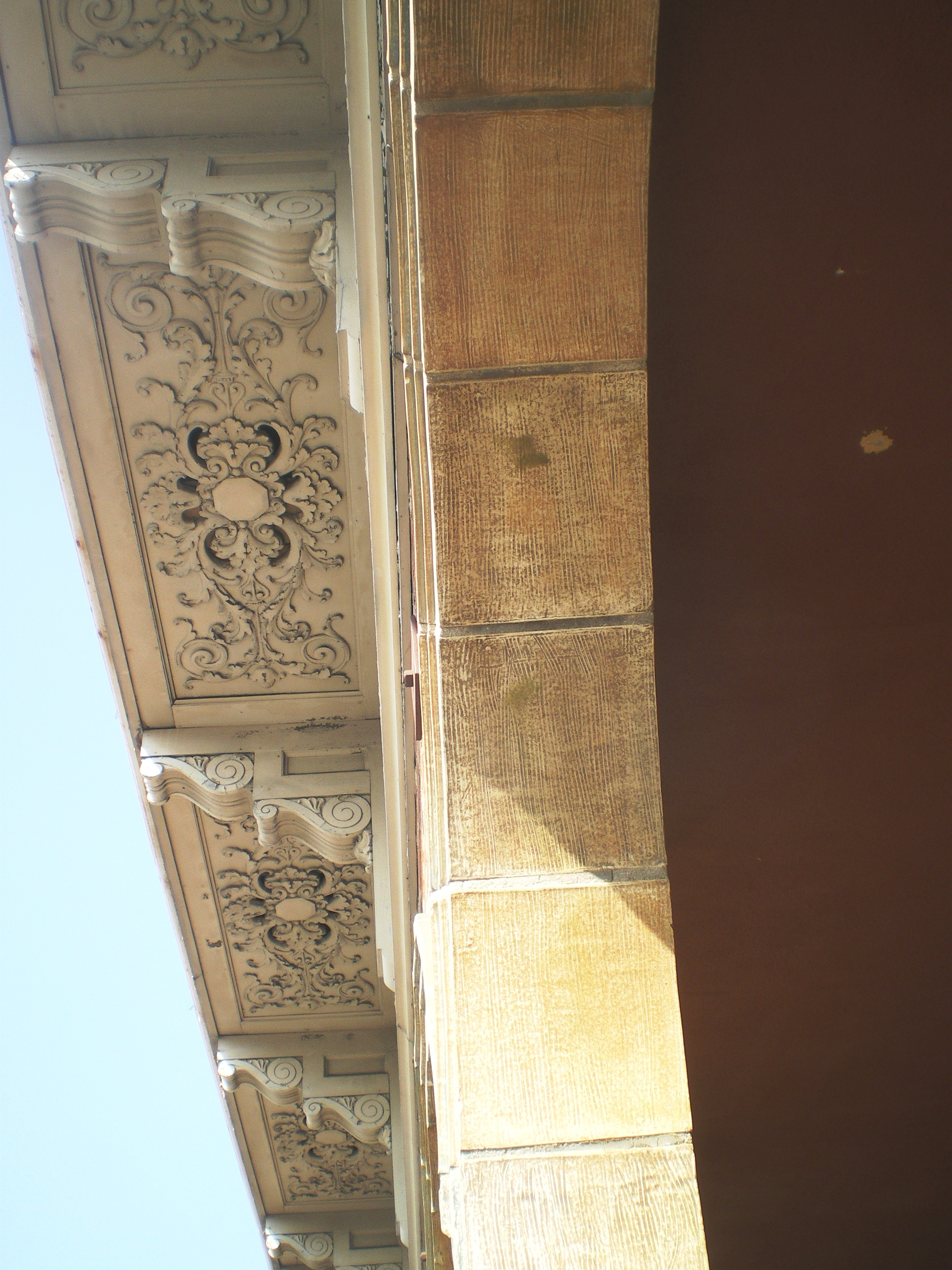
View looking up at Figueroa Street eaves from Banquet Hall balcony

The renovated building opened in January 1990, with the second floor converted into a community meeting place and banquet hall. The Lodge Room was preserved much as it was in 1923. However, the chandeliers in the Lodge Room were replaced in the 1950s or 1960s with green light fixtures; the new owners installed antique light fixtures in the room as part of their restoration project. The Banquet Hall (in the front of the building along Figueroa) has been converted into a wood-floored multi-purpose room. The two large second-floor rooms are now rented to the public for wedding receptions, anniversaries, quinceañeras, and other functions.

The third floor was converted to office space, rented initially to Operation Headstart. In order to make room for offices on the third floor, an interior balcony overlooking the Lodge Room and Banquet Hall had to be removed—one of the few sacrifices made to preservation.

== Lodge Room and Checker Hall ==
As of 2018 the building is used as a live music venue with an attached bar and restaurant.

== Historic designation ==
The building was declared a Los Angeles Historic-Cultural Monument in 1984 (HCM #282), and added to the National Register of Historic Places in 1990.

== Gallery of photos ==
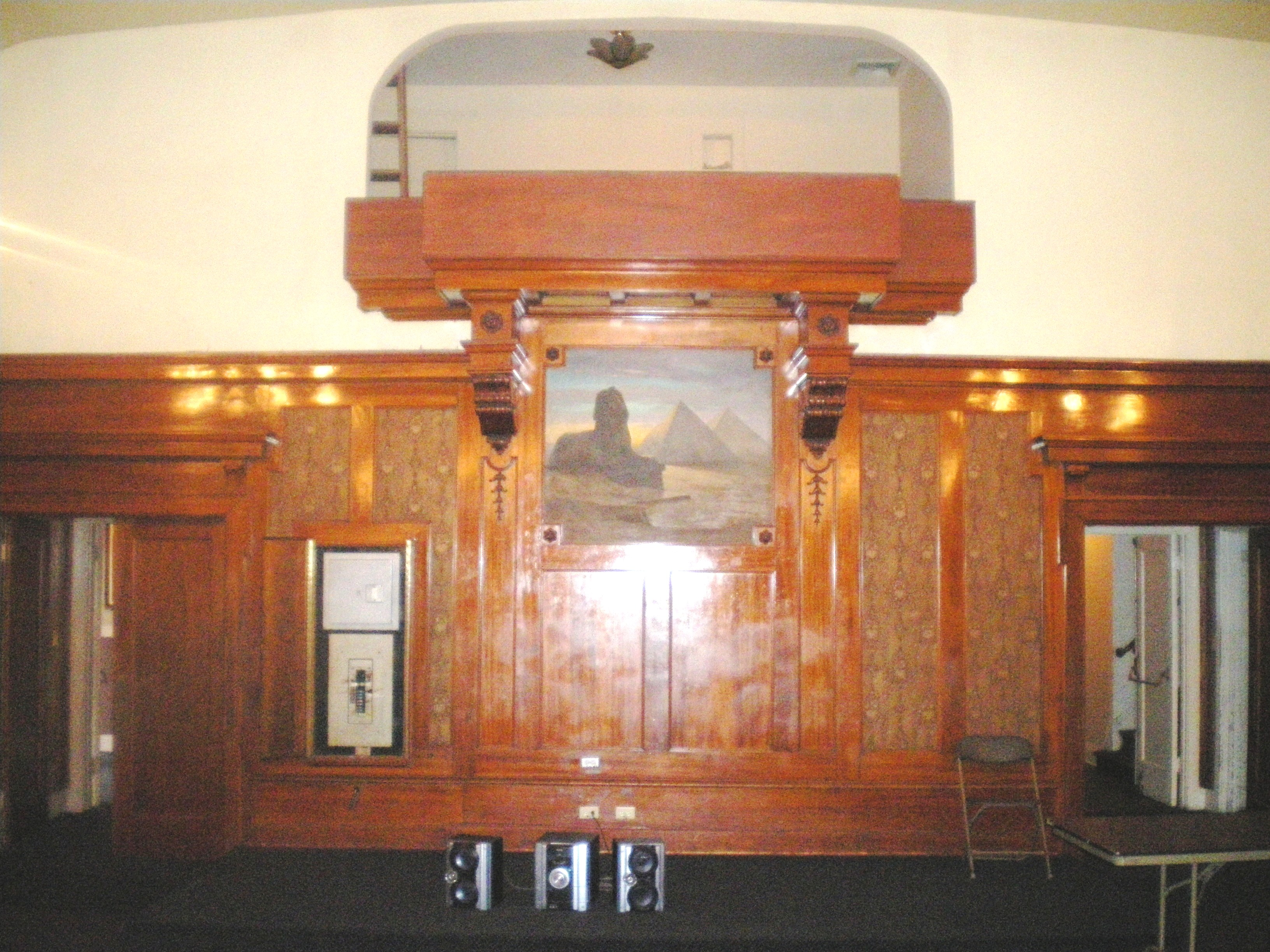
Stage and anaglypta wall covering in Lodge Room

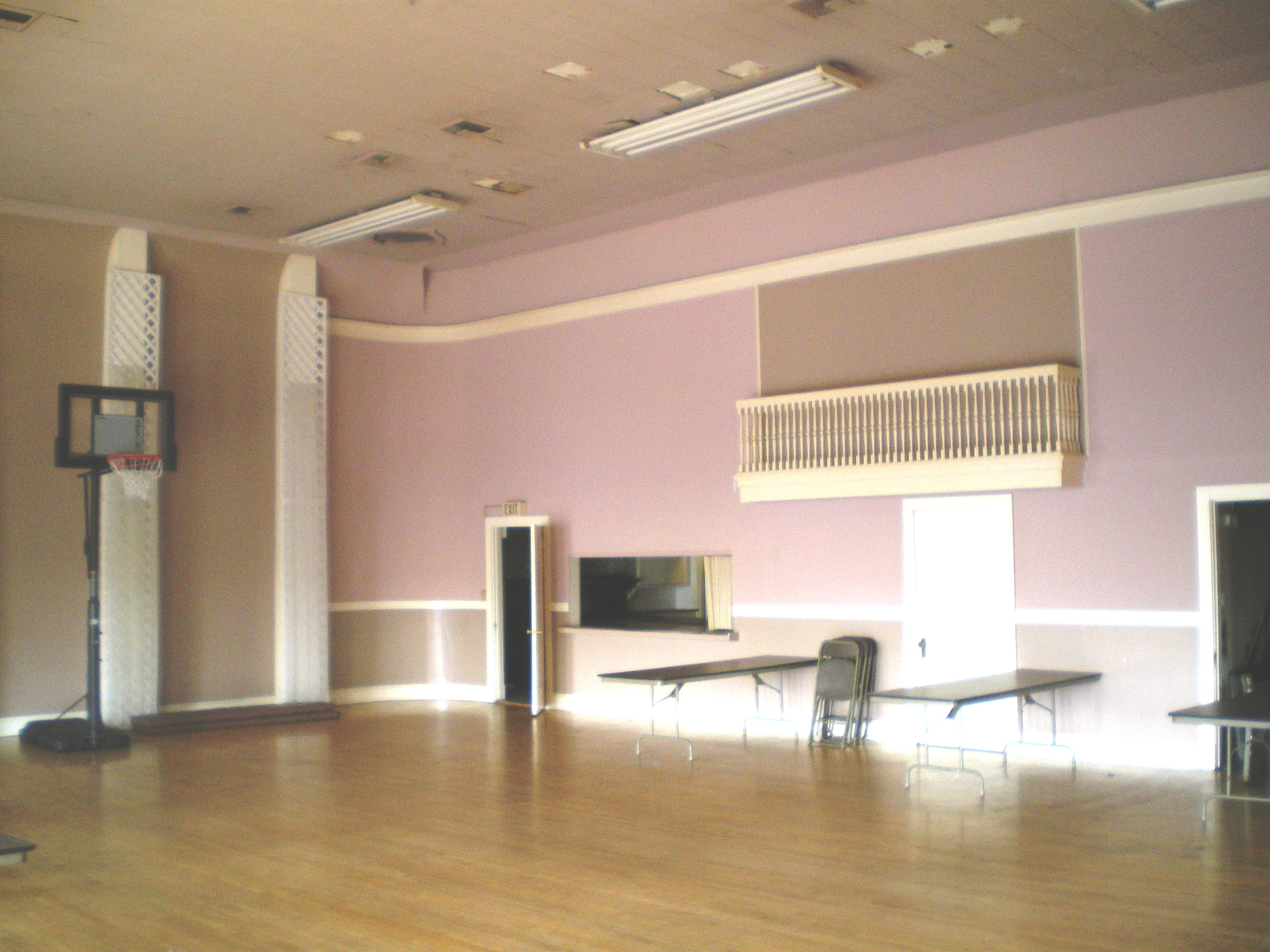
Banquet Hall in July 2008

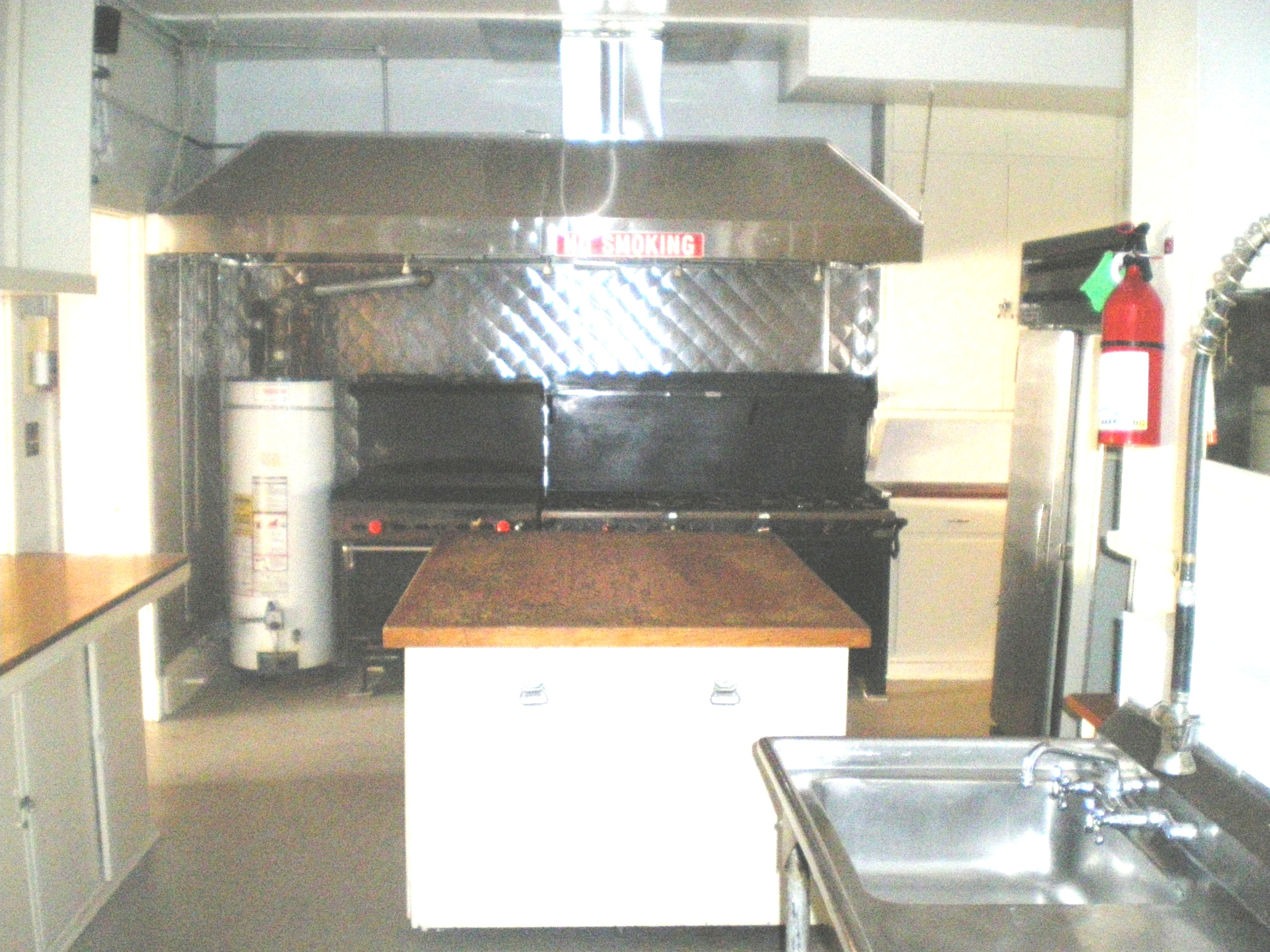
Kitchen

== See also ==
- List of Los Angeles Historic-Cultural Monuments on the East and Northeast Sides — images and locations.
- List of Registered Historic Places in Los Angeles — National Register.
