= Wiken =

Family name

Wiken or Wikén is a surname. It can refer to:

- Elise Ryder Wikén (born 1968), Swedish politician
- Emma Wikén, a Swedish skier
- Per Olav Wiken, a Norwegian sailor

== See also ==
- Wilken
