= Academia Avance Charter =

Coordinates: 34.107287°N 118.198096°W

Location
- 115 N Ave 53; Highland Park, Los Angeles, California

Information
- Type: Public
- Established: 2005
- Director: Ricardo Mireles
- Principal: Josh Frankfort MS/Ricardo Gonzalez HS
- Enrollment: 350
- Campus: Urban
- Mascot: Guerrero Jaguars

Academia Avance Charter (AA) is a public charter middle and high school in the Highland Park neighborhood of Los Angeles, California, approximately seven miles northeast of downtown. It is part of the Los Angeles County Board of Education and chartered through the California State Board of Education.

First established in 2005 with an enrollment of 100 students, Academia Avance has since grown to a student body of approximately 350 students from grades six to twelve across two campuses: a middle school location by Sycamore Grove Park and a high school location in the basement of a Presbyterian church at North Avenue 53 and Figueroa Street.

In 2017, Academia Avance gained international media attention after an eighth grade student filmed ICE agents arresting her undocumented father Rómulo Avelica as he was dropping her and her sister off at the middle school campus. The video eventually went viral and sparked widespread outcry among critics of United States immigration policy. Through the efforts of immigrants' rights activists, Avelica was freed from detention that same year.

On October 15, 2019, the Los Angeles Unified School District denied the renewal of Academia Avance's Charter stating that "the charter school presents an unsound educational program for the pupils to be enrolled in the charter school." On March 12, 2020, the California State Board of Education approved the renewal of Academia Avance's charter. The current charter will enable the school to continue operating until the end of the 2024–2025 school year.

== Locations ==
- 2005: Ramona Hall, Highland Park, Los Angeles
- 2006: Highland Park Presbyterian Community Church, Highland Park, Los Angeles
- 2007: Plaza de la Raza, Lincoln Heights
- 2008: Highland Park Presbyterian Community Church, Highland Park, Los Angeles
- 2009: Middle School - 2670 Griffin Avenue, Los Angeles. High School - Highland Park Presbyterian Community Church, Highland Park, Los Angeles
- 2010: Middle & High Schools - Highland Park Presbyterian Community Church - Highland Park, Los Angeles
- 2011: Middle School - Highland Park Presbyterian Community Church - Highland Park, Los Angeles. High School - World Trade Center - 333 S Flower St, Los Angeles
- 2012: Middle School - Los Angeles Boys and Girls Club, 2635 Pasadena Avenue, Los Angeles. High School - Highland Park Presbyterian Community Church, Highland Park, Los Angeles
- 2020: Middle School - Sycamore Park Care Center, 4585 N Figueroa St, Los Angeles, CA 90065. High School - Highland Park Presbyterian Community Church, Highland Park, Los Angeles
