= Wilk =

Wilk is a surname of English and Polish-language origin.

In Poland, the surname means wolf and is pronounced [ˈvilk]. It has 35,000 bearers in Poland and ranks about 60th on the list of the most popular Polish surnames (fifth in Podkarpackie Voivodeship). It is common in many parts of southern Poland, especially among the Lasowiacy sub-ethnic group. Its variants include Wilczek (a diminutive meaning "little wolf") and Wilczyński, which may also derive from toponyms with the stem wilk.

In English, the surname is a back formation of Wilkin, which originated as a short form of William. English-language variants include Wilkes, Wilke, Wilks, Wilkin, and Wilkins.

The following people bear the surname:

- Adam Wilk (born 1987), American baseball pitcher
- Brad Wilk (born 1968), American musician
- Cezary Wilk (born 1986), Polish footballer
- "General Wilk" (1895–1951), nom de guerre of Aleksander Krzyzanowski
- Jakub Wilk (born 1985), Polish footballer
- Kasia Wilk (born 1982), Polish singer
- Katarzyna Wilk (born 1992), Polish swimmer
- Maurice Wilk (died 1963), American violinist
- Martin Wilk (1922–2013), Canadian statistician, Shapiro–Wilk test
- Max Wilk (1920–2011), American playwright, screenwriter and author
- Michael Wilk (born c. 1952), American songwriter
- Rafał Wilk (born 1974), Polish speedway rider and Paralympic cyclist
- Scott Wilk (born 1959), American politician
- Vic Wilk (born 1960), American golfer
- Wojciech Wilk (born 1972), Polish politician

Fictional characters include:

- Jonathan Wilk, the main character in the film Compulsion (1959), played by Orson Welles
- Patricia Wilk, a character in Scrubs
