= Wilczek (surname) =

Wilczek (Polish pronunciation: [ˈvilt͡ʂɛk]) is a surname of Polish-language origin. A diminutive form of Wilk, it means "little wolf" in Polish. It is used by 9,000–10,000 people in Polish land, with the greatest number found in Silesia, Podhale, the Warsaw region, Lublin and Łańcut. The surname may refer to:

== People ==
- Ernő Wilczek (1883–1950), Hungarian engineer
- Ernst Wilczek (1867–1948), Swiss botanist
- Erwin Wilczek (1940–2021), retired Polish soccer player
- Frank Wilczek (born 1951), Nobel laureate physicist
- Franz Wilczek (1869–1916), Austrian-American violinist
- Georgina von Wilczek (1921–1989), member of the royal family of Liechtenstein
- Count Johann Nepomuk Wilczek (1837–1922), sponsor of Polar expeditions and artists
- Kamil Wilczek (born 1988), Polish footballer
- Marcin Wilczek (born 1967), Polish diplomat
- Mieczysław Wilczek (1932–2014), Polish politician, chemist and businessman
- Piotr Wilczek (born 1962), Polish historian, Ambassador of Poland to the United States
- Sylwester Wilczek (born 1936), Polish ice hockey player
