= Wicken =

Wicken may refer to:

== Places ==
- Wicken, Cambridgeshire, England
  - Wicken Lode and Wicken Fen are nearby
- Wicken, Northamptonshire, England
- Wicken Bonhunt, a village in Essex, England
- Wicken Green Village, a new village created in Norfolk, England, from the married quarters of the former RAF Sculthorpe

== People with the surname ==
- Elizabeth Wicken (1927–2011), Canadian baseball player
- Joan Wicken (1925–2004), personal assistant to Tanzanian president Julius Nyerere

== See also ==
- Wiccan, a practitioner of Wicca
- Wickens, surname
- Wickham (disambiguation)
