= Wilkins House =

Wilkins House may refer to:

- Wilkins House, historical building in Los Angeles, California
- Wilkins House, listed on the National Register of Historic Places (NRHP) in Clarke County, Georgia
- Wilkins House, in Greenville, South Carolina
- Wilkins House, listed on the NRHP in Harris County, Texas
- Townsend-Wilkins House, Victoria, Texas, listed on the NRHP in Victoria County, Texas
- Gordon Wilkins House, house designed by architect Richard Neutra in 1949
- Emily J. Wilkins House, Embassy of Peru in Washington, D.C.
