= Wilczyński =

Wilczyński (Polish pronunciation: [vilˈt͡ʂɨɲski]; feminine: Wilczyńska; plural: Wilczyńscy) is a surname of Polish-language origin. It derives either directly from Wilk (meaning "wolf") or from toponyms with this stem (Wilczyn, Wilczyna, Wilczyno). About 17,000 people use the surname in Poland, with the greatest number found in Ostrów Mazowiecka, Dębica, and Kielce. Notable people include:

- Daniel Wilczynski (born 1956), French footballer
- Ernest Julius Wilczynski (1876–1932), American mathematician
- Jan Kazimierz Wilczyński (1806–1885), Polish medical doctor, collector and publisher
- Józef Olszyna-Wilczyński (1890–1939), Polish general
- Katerina Wilczynski (1894–1978), Polish artist
- Konrad Wilczynski (1982), Austrian handball player
- Vincent Wilczynski, American engineer and academic administrator
- Walter Wilczynski (1952–2020), American neuroscientist and ethologist
- Wojciech Wilczyński (1990), Polish footballer
