= Highland Park, Los Angeles =

Highland Park
- Neighborhood of Los Angeles
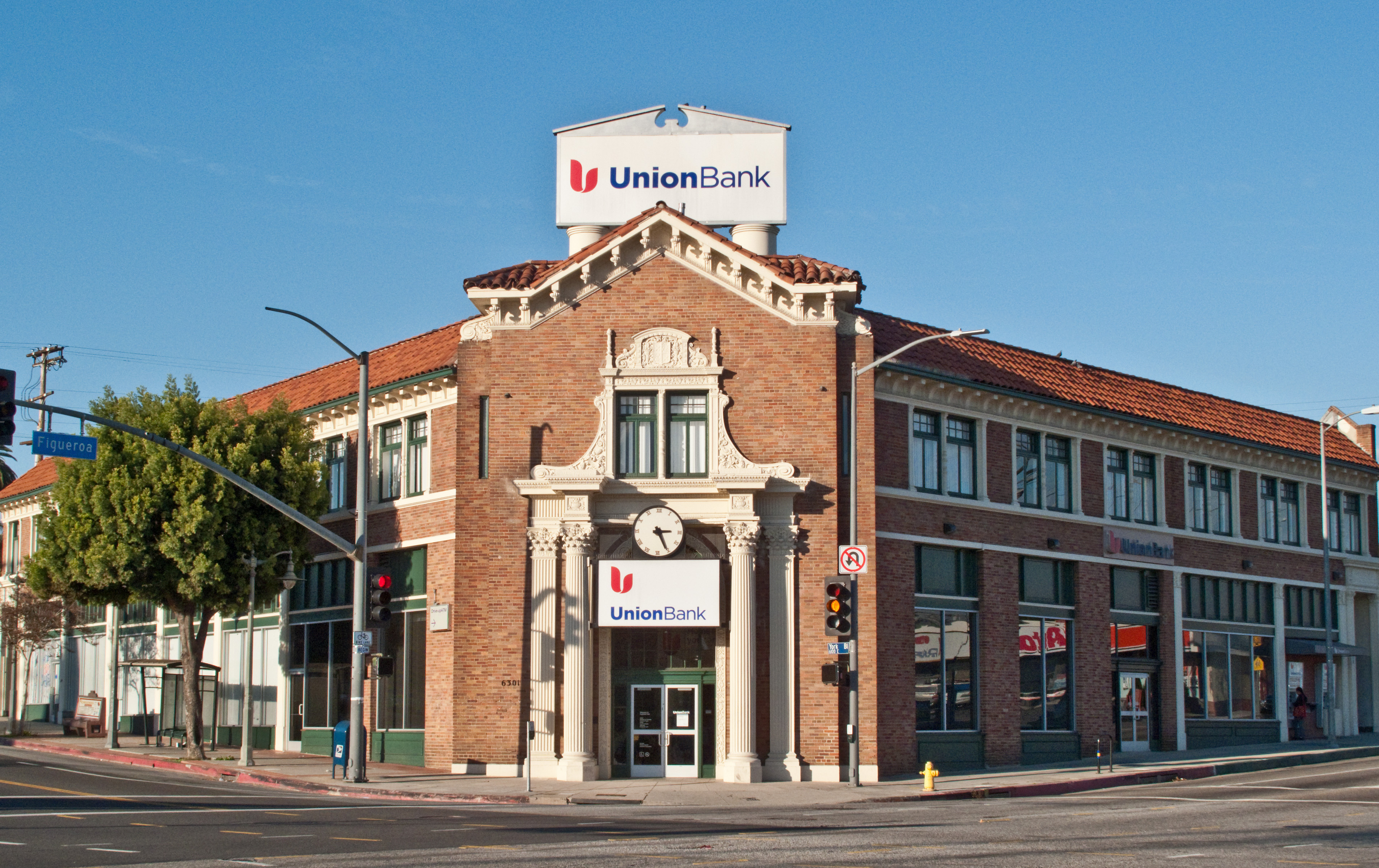
- Arroyo Seco Bank on Figueroa

- Location within Los Angeles
- Coordinates: 34°06′43″N 118°11′53″W
- Country: United States
- State: California
- County: Los Angeles
- City: Los Angeles

Government
  - City Council: Eunisses Hernandez (D); Ysabel Jurado (D)
  - State Assembly: Jessica Caloza (D)
  - State Senate: María Elena Durazo (D)
  - US Senators: Alex Padilla (D); Adam Schiff (D)
  - U.S. House: Jimmy Gomez (D)

Area
  - Total: 3.4 sq mi (8.8 km^{2})
- Elevation: 591 ft (180 m)

Population (2000)
  - Total: 57,566
  - Density: 16,809/sq mi (6,490/km^{2})
- Population changes significantly depending on areas included and recent growth.
- Time zone: UTC−8 (PST)
  - Summer (DST): UTC−7 (PDT)
- ZIP Code: 90041–90042
- Area code: 213/323

Highland Park is a neighborhood in Los Angeles, California, located in the city's Northeast region. It was one of the first subdivisions of Los Angeles and is inhabited by a variety of ethnic and socioeconomic groups.

== History ==
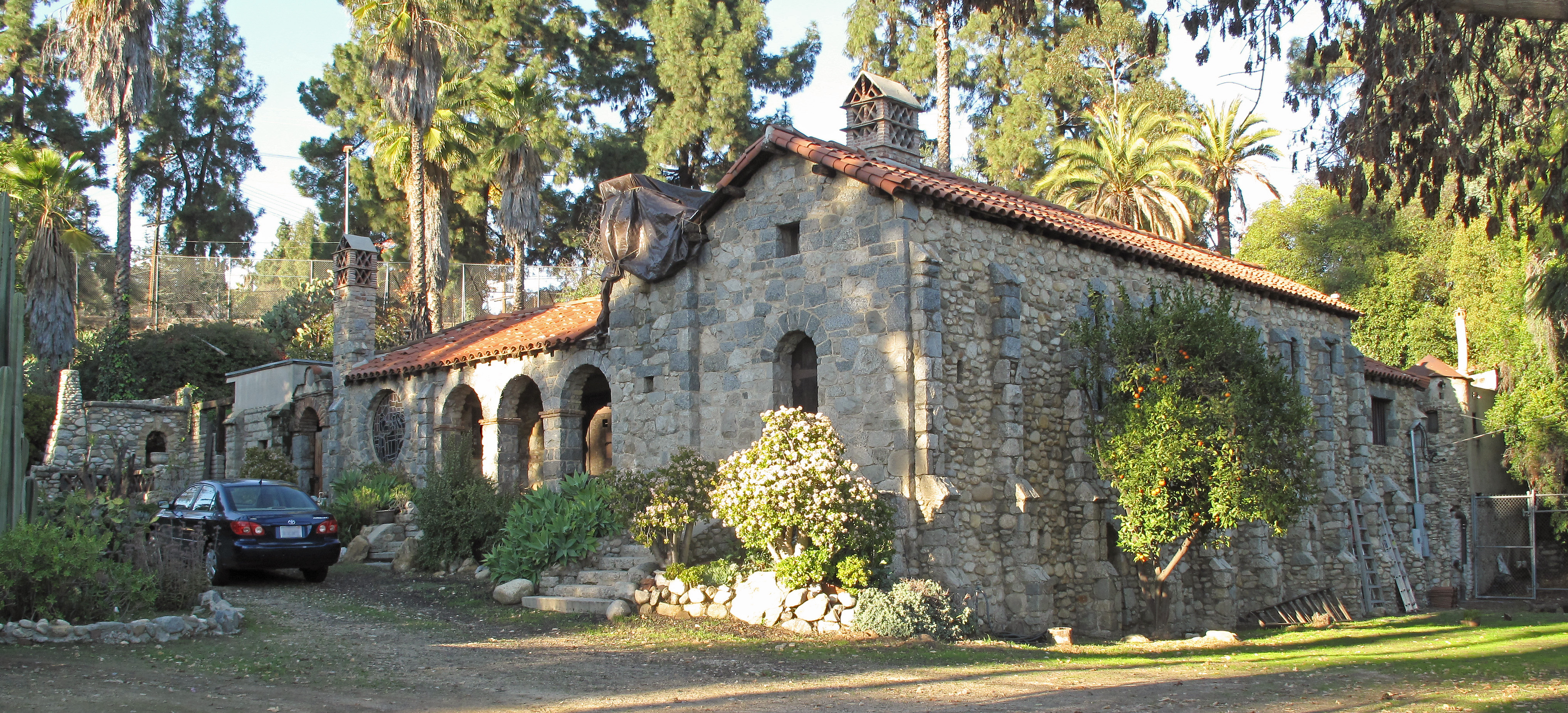
Abbey San Encino, built starting in 1915.

The area was settled thousands of years ago by Paleo-Indians, and would later be settled by the Kizh. After the founding of Los Angeles in 1781, the Corporal of the Guard at the Mission San Gabriel Arcángel, Jose Maria Verdugo, was granted the 36,403 acre Rancho San Rafael which included present day Highland Park. Drought in the mid-19th century resulted in economic hardship for the Verdugo family, which eventually compelled them to auction off Rancho San Rafael in 1869 for $3,500 over an unpaid loan. The San Rafael tract was purchased by Andrew Glassell and Albert J. Chapman, who leased it out to sheep herders. In 1885, during the 1880s land boom, it was sold to George Morgan and Albert Judson, who combined it with other parcels they had purchased from the Verdugo family to create the Highland Park tract in 1886. Two rail lines were built to Highland Park, which later helped the town to survive the burst of the property bubble. Highland Park was annexed to Los Angeles in 1895. In the early 20th century, Highland Park and neighboring Pasadena became enclaves for artists and intellectuals who were adherents of the Arts and Crafts movement.

With the completion of Arroyo Seco Parkway in 1940, Highland Park began to experience white flight, losing residents to the Mid-Wilshire district and newer neighborhoods in Temple City and in the San Fernando Valley. By the mid-1960s, it was becoming a largely Latino district. Mexican immigrants and their American-born children began owning and renting in Highland Park, with its schools and parks becoming places where residents debated over how to fight discrimination and advance civil rights.

In the final decades of the 20th century, portions of Highland Park suffered waves of gang violence as a consequence of the Avenues street gang claiming them and the adjacent neighborhood of Glassell Park as its territory. At the beginning of the 21st century, then-City Attorney Rocky Delgadillo, a Highland Park native, intensified efforts to rid Northeast Los Angeles of the Avenues. In 2006, four members of the gang were convicted of violating federal hate crime laws. In June 2009, police launched a major raid against the gang, rooting out many leaders of the gang with a federal racketeering indictment, demolishing the gang's Glassell Park stronghold. Law enforcement, coupled with community awareness efforts such as the annual Peace in the Northeast March, have led to a drastic decrease in violent crime in the 2010s.

In the early 2000s, relatively low rents and home prices, as well as Highland Park's pedestrian-friendly streets and proximity to Downtown Los Angeles attracted people of greater affluence than had previously been typical, as well as a reversal of the white flight from previous decades. Of special interest were the district's surviving Craftsman homes. Similar to Echo Park and Eagle Rock, Highland Park has experienced rapid gentrification. The topic of Highland Park's rapid neighborhood changes has garnered national and international attention.

In the 2010s, Highland Park experienced significant job growth, especially with businesses along Figueroa Street and York Boulevard. Its educational, health, and social service careers also developed robustly during this period. However, most workers employed in Highland Park do not live there but commute from surrounding areas instead. The benefits of Highland Park's 21st century economic revitalization have been experienced unevenly, bypassing many of the area’s longtime Latino residents.

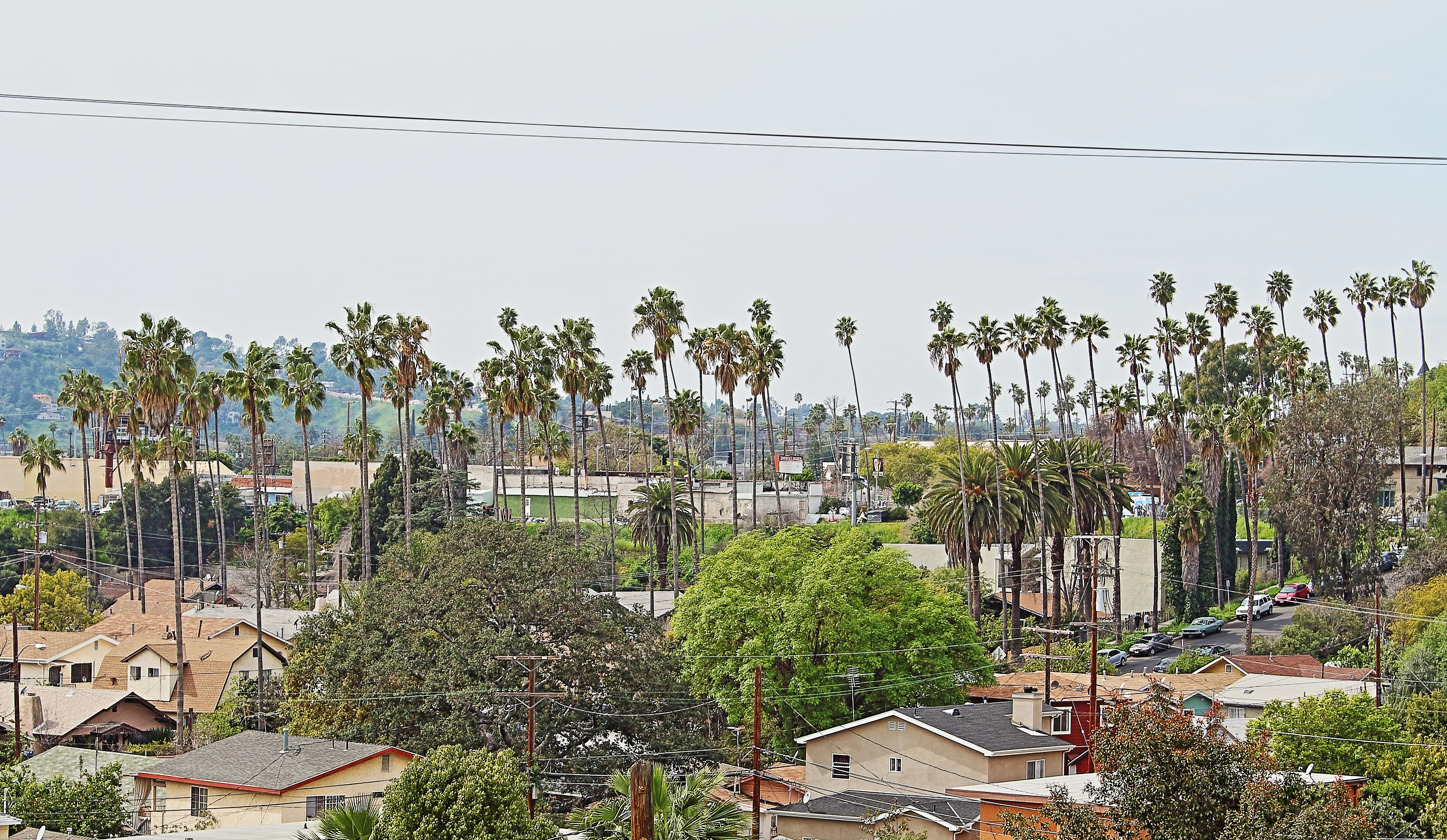
Neighborhood view from Avenue 64, 2017

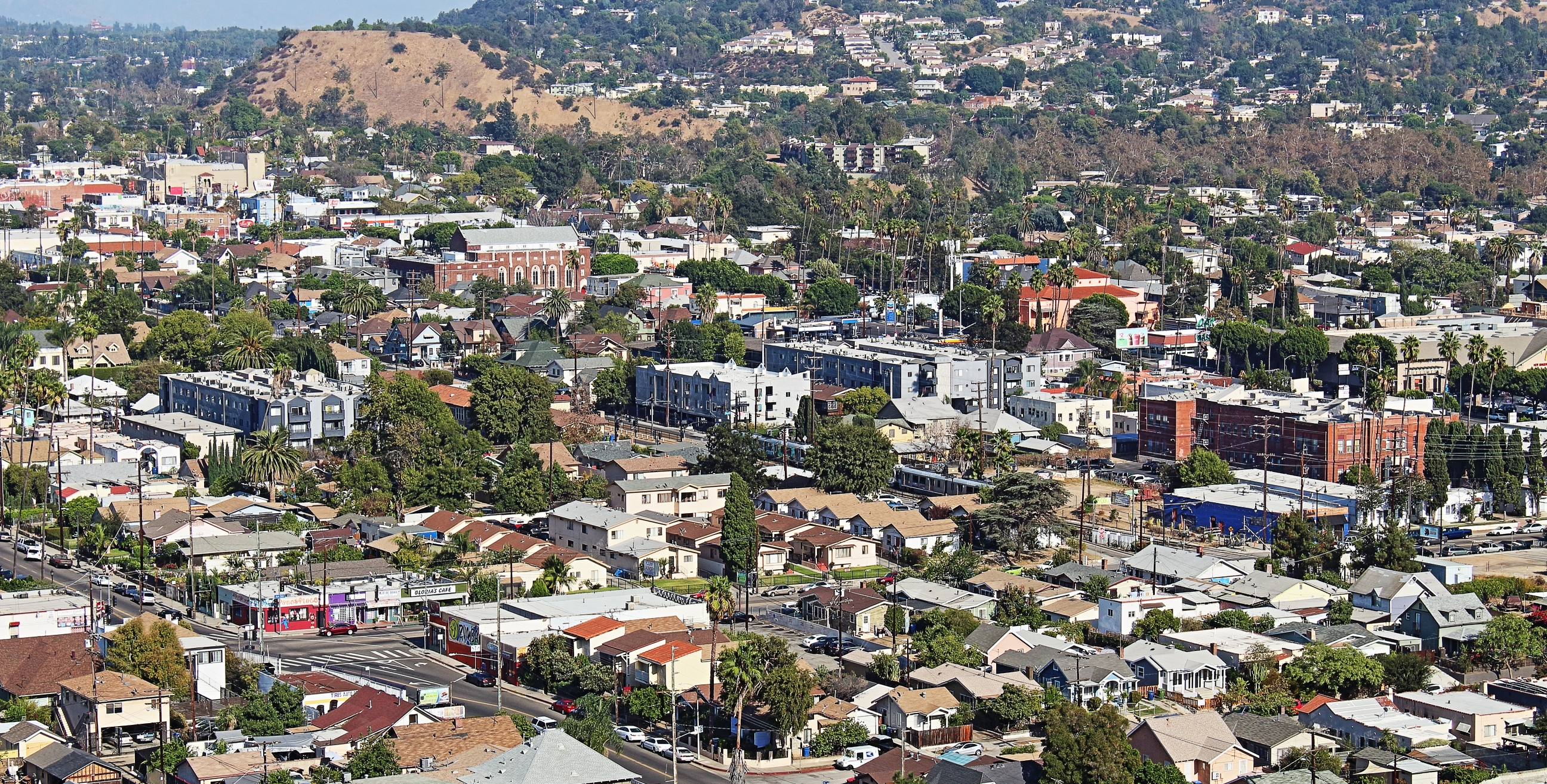
From Monte Vista to the 110 freeway, 2018

== Geography and climate ==
Highland Park’s boundaries are roughly the Arroyo Seco Parkway (California Route 110) on the southeast, Pasadena on the northeast, Oak Grove Drive on the north, South Pasadena on the east, and Avenue 51 on the west. Primary thoroughfares include York Boulevard and Figueroa Street.

Highland Park sits within the Northeast Los Angeles region along with Mount Washington, Cypress Park, Glassell Park, Atwater Village, and Eagle Rock.

Climate data for Highland Park, Los Angeles
Month	Jan	Feb	Mar	Apr	May	Jun	Jul	Aug	Sep	Oct	Nov	Dec	Year
Mean daily maximum °F (°C)	68 (20)	70 (21)	71 (22)	75 (24)	77 (25)	83 (28)	88 (31)	89 (32)	87 (31)	82 (28)	74 (23)	69 (21)	78 (26)
Mean daily minimum °F (°C)	45 (7)	47 (8)	48 (9)	51 (11)	55 (13)	59 (15)	62 (17)	63 (17)	61 (16)	56 (13)	49 (9)	45 (7)	53 (12)
Average precipitation inches (mm)	3.94 (100)	4.39 (112)	3.79 (96)	1.00 (25)	0.35 (8.9)	0.14 (3.6)	0.02 (0.51)	0.15 (3.8)	0.39 (9.9)	0.59 (15)	1.33 (34)	2.18 (55)	18.29 (465)

== Demographics ==
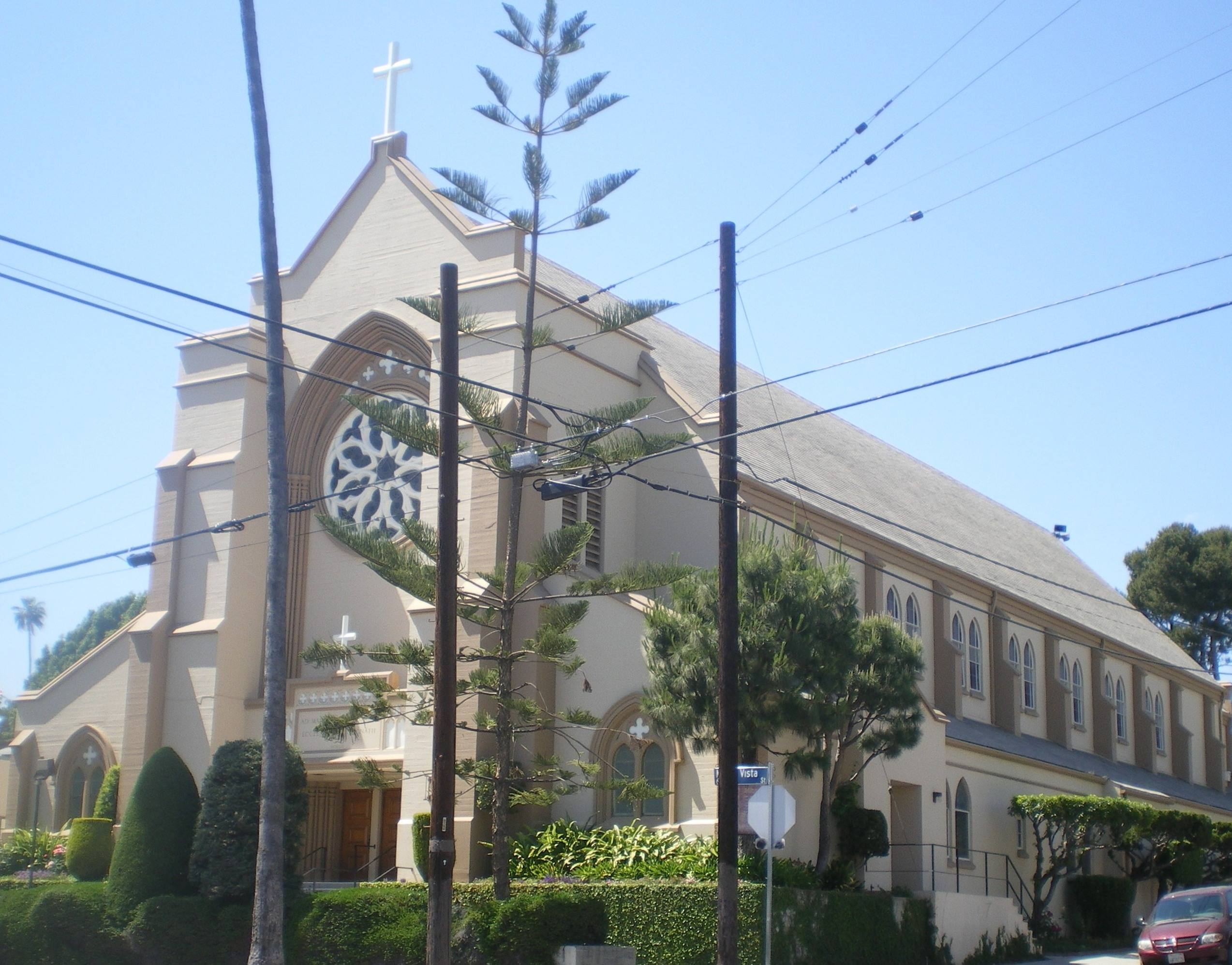
St. Ignatius of Loyola Church.

The 2000 U.S. census counted 56,566 residents in the 3.42-square-mile neighborhood—an average of 16,835 people per square mile. In 2008, the city estimated that the population had increased to 60,841. The median age for residents was 28.

The ethnic composition of Highland Park in 2000 was 72.4% Latino, 11.3% Non-Hispanic White, 11.2% Asian, 2.4% Black, and others, 2.6%. Among the 45% of residents born abroad, Mexico and El Salvador were the most common countries of origin. Mexican and German were the most common ancestries.

The median household income in 2008 dollars was $45,478, and 59% of households earned $40,000 or less. The average household size was 3.3 people. Renters occupied 60.9% of the housing units.

The percentage of never-married men was 41%. The 2000 census found that 21% of families were headed by single parents. There were 1,942 military veterans in 2000, or 4.9% of the population.

According to the 2020 United States census, the ethnic composition of Highland Park in 2020 was 58.7% Latino, 21.8% Non-Hispanic White, 13.4% Asian, 1.8% Black, and 4.3% others. Overall, the population of Highland Park decreased by 7% between 2010 and 2020.

== Government and infrastructure ==
- The Highland Park Post Office - 5930 North Figueroa Street.
- Los Angeles Fire Department Station 12 - 5921 North Figueroa Street.

== Transportation ==
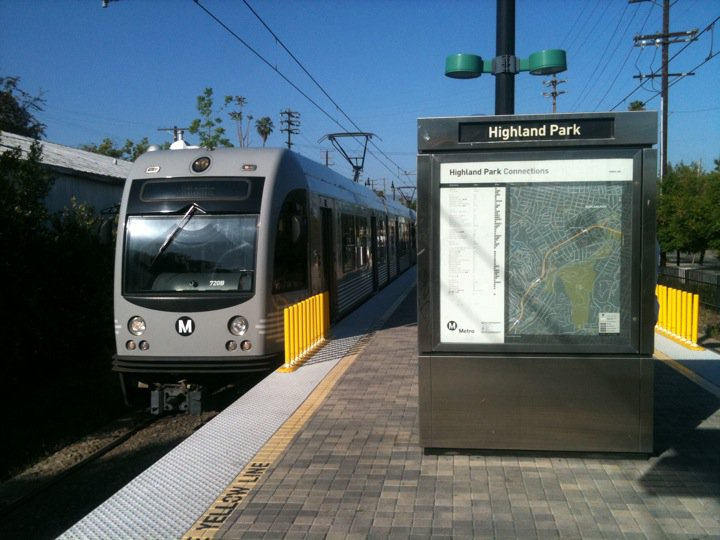
LACMTA train pulling into Highland Park Station, 2012

- The A Line - The Highland Park Station is located at the intersection of North Avenue 57 at Marmion Way. Built upon the same site as another rail station which was demolished in 1965, the new Highland Park Station was opened in 2003 as part of the original Gold Line.
- Metro Local bus lines 81 & 182 connect to the surrounding areas of Pasadena, South Pasadena, the San Gabriel Valley, and Downtown Los Angeles.
- Pasadena Transit 33 has served the area since Dec. 15, 2024.
- LADOT's DASH Highland Park/Eagle Rock bus line begins in San Pascual Park and ends near the city limits with Glendale. The route connects several local schools, shopping districts, and the Eagle Rock Plaza.
- Arroyo Seco Parkway (California State Route 110) - formerly known as the Pasadena Freeway, it runs through Highland Park and has served local commuters since it opened in 1940.

== Parks and libraries ==
- Highland Park Recreation Center - 6150 Piedmont Avenue.
- York Boulevard Park - 4948 York Boulevard.
- Sycamore Grove Park - 4702 N. Figueroa St.
- Hermon Park/Arroyo Seco Park - 5566 Via Marisol.
- Garvanza Park - 6240 Meridian St.

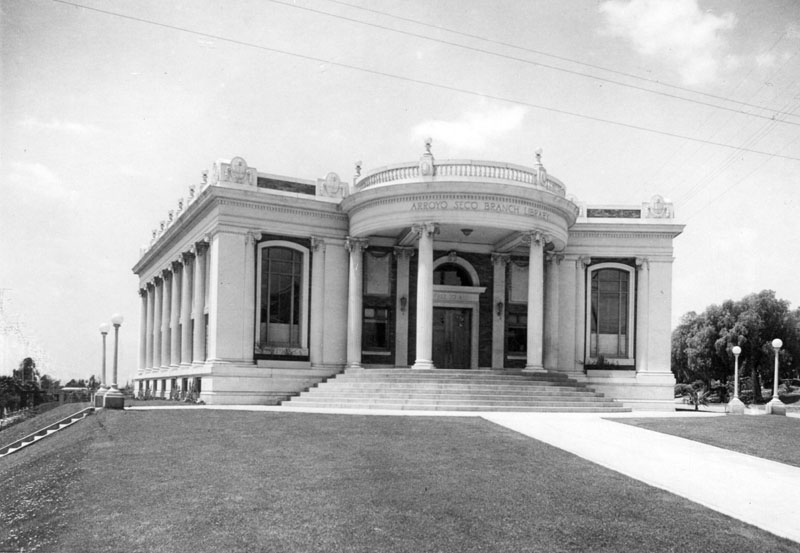
Exterior of Highland Park's original Arroyo Seco Branch Library in 1914.

- Arroyo Seco Regional Library - 6145 N Figueroa Street. It is a branch of Los Angeles Public Library.

Highland Park was served by a series of public libraries starting in 1890. It housed a collection of 50 books at the now demolished Miller's Hall, formerly located on York Boulevard between Avenues 63 and 64. As the library's collection grew, it was moved to other locations along nearby Avenue 64 in order to accommodate. A grant from Andrew Carnegie made possible a purpose-built facility which eventually became the original Arroyo Seco Library. Its location was decided upon in 1911 as a compromise between the competing residential centers of the district, as well in order to adhere to the stipulations of the grant. The library was opened in 1914.

On October 17, 1960, a newly constructed Arroyo Seco Library was opened to the public, replacing the original building after 46 years of service. Designed by architect John Landon, the second Arroyo Seco Library was the base of operations for the entire northeast region of the Los Angeles Public Library system. It also was equipped with rooftop parking which had access to the library's front door, a feature that was first of its kind among public libraries in the United States. This building would itself be replaced by another, modernized facility in 2003.

== Religion ==
Highland Park is home to a wide array of religious practitioners. The St. Ignatius Church has been the house of worship for followers of Roman Catholicism in the district since the early 20th century. Originally located on Avenue 52, the church was moved to its present location on the corner of Avenue 60 and Monte Vista Street in 1915.

Temple Beth Israel of Highland Park and Eagle Rock was founded in Highland Park in 1923 and constructed its building in 1930. It is the second oldest synagogue in Los Angeles still operating in its original location, after the Wilshire Boulevard Temple (built in 1929).

== Landmarks and attractions ==
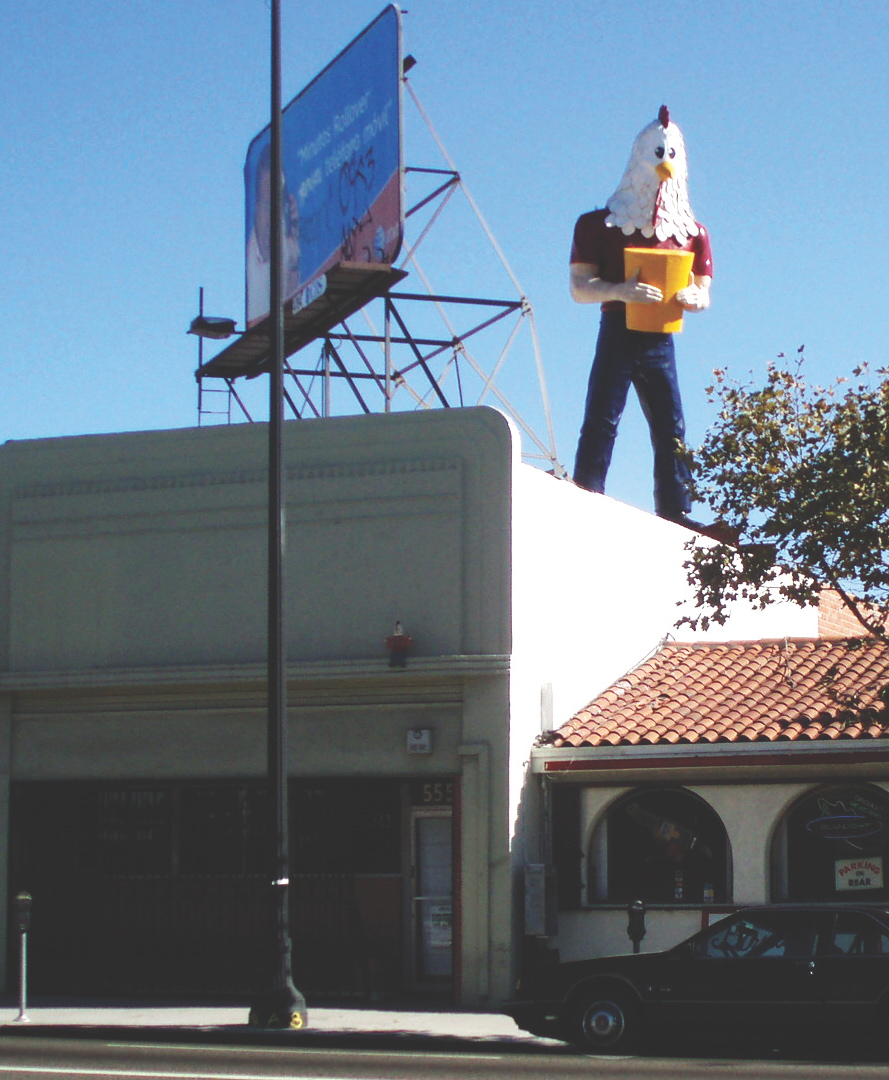
Chicken Boy statue Los Angeles

- Galco's Soda Pop Stop has been owned and operated by the Nese family for more than a century.
- Avenue 50 Studio, a nonprofit community-based organization grounded in Latino and Chicano culture.
- Tierra de la Culebra Park, a public art park.
- Pisgah Home Historic District - added to the National Register of Historic Places in 2007.
- Chicken Boy Statue - appeared above Future Studio Gallery on October 17, 2007.

=== Historic-Cultural Monuments ===
The following Historic-Cultural Monuments are located in Highland Park:

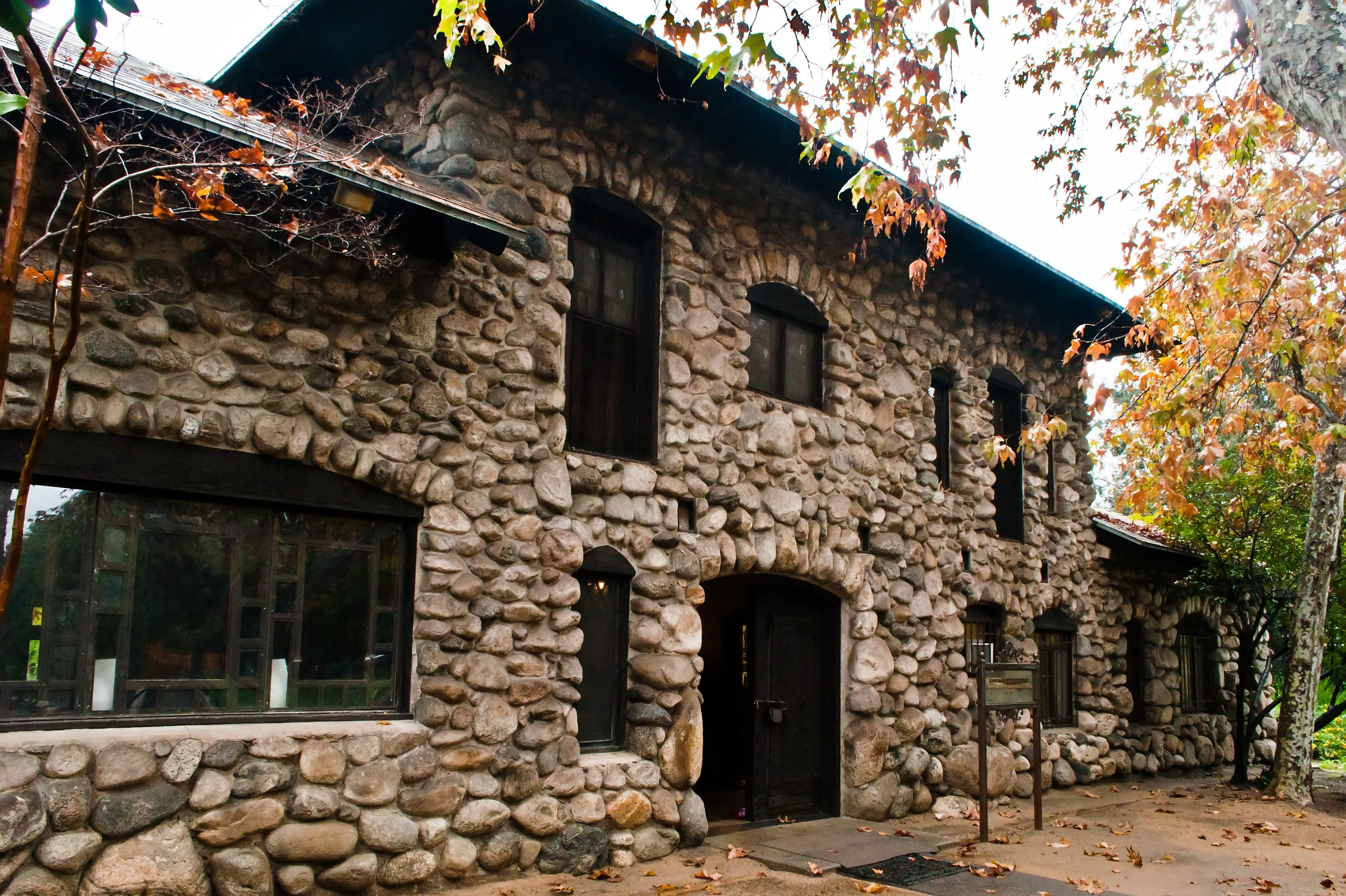
El Alisal, HCM #68.

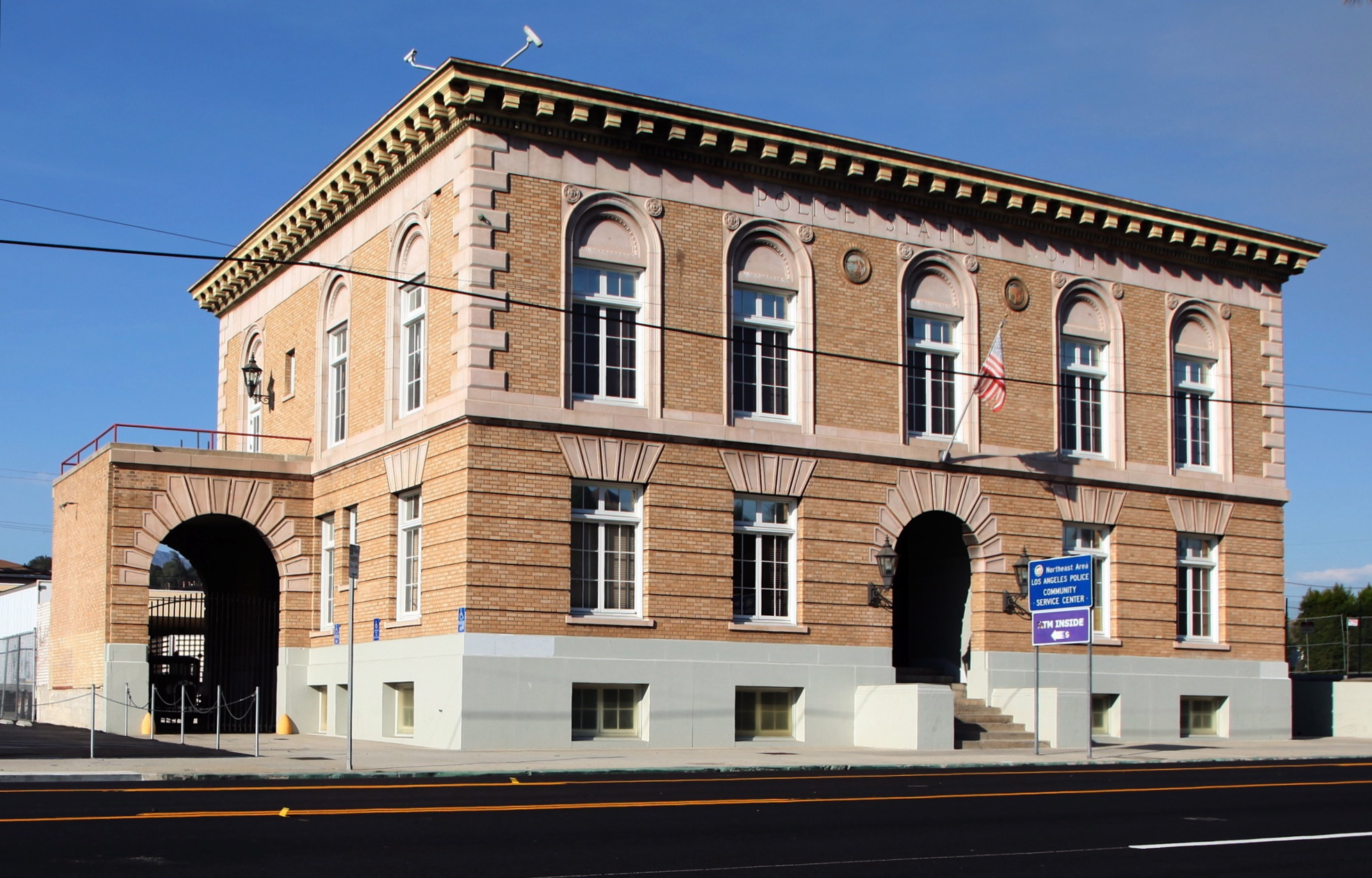
Highland Park Police Station, HCM #274.

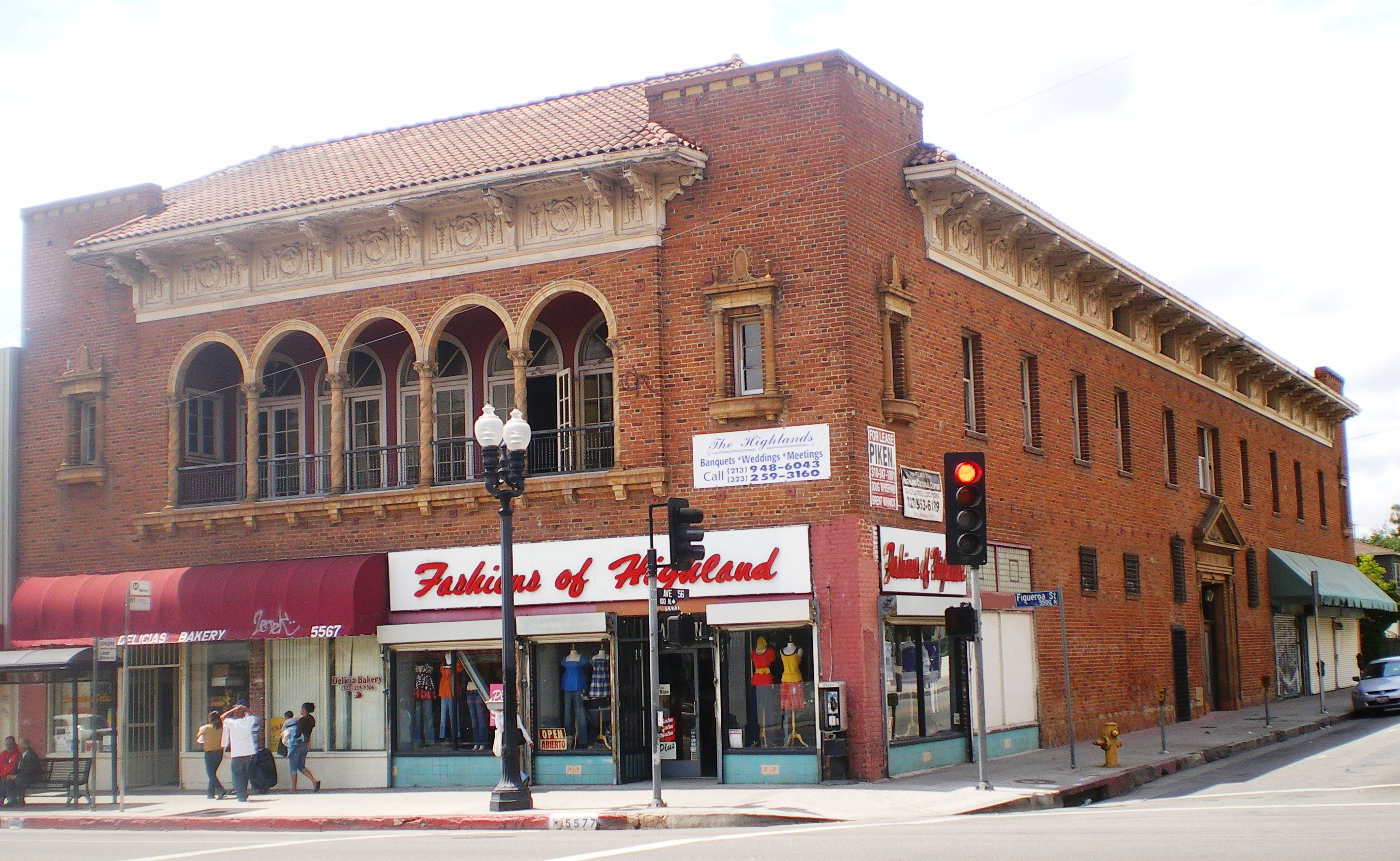
The Highland Park Masonic Temple, HCM #282

- #68 – Charles Lummis Residence, 200 E. Avenue 43, 1970
- #105 – Hiner House, 757 N. Figueroa Street, 1972
- #106 – Abbey San Encino, 6211 Arroyo Glen, 1972
- #142 – El Mio, 5905 El Mio Drive, 1975
- #143 – Stroh Residnce, 6028 Hayes Avenue, 1975
- #274 – Highland Park Police Station, 6045 York Boulevard, 1984
- #282 – Highland Park Masonic Temple, 104 N. Avenue 56, 1984
- #284 – Ebell Club Building, 125-135 S. Avenue 57, 1984
- #287 – Yoakum House, 140-154 S. Avenue 59, 1985
- #338 – Drake House, 210-220 S. Avenue 60, 1988
- #339 – Santa Fe Arroyo Seco Railroad Bridge, 162 S. Avenue 61, 1988
- #400 – Sunrise Court, 5721-5729 Monte Vista Street, 1988
- #416 – Ziegler Estate, 4601 N. Figueroa Boulevard, 1989
- #469 – Ivar I. Phillips Dwelling, 4200 N. Figueroa Street, 1989
- #470 – Ivar I. Phillips Residence, 4204 N. Figueroa Street, 1989
- #492 – Arroyo Seco Bank Building, 6301-6311 N. Figueroa Street, 1990
- #493 – Casa de Adobe, 4603-4613 Figueroa Street, 1990
- #494 – Kelman Residence and Carriage Barn, 5029 Echo Street, 1990
- #539 – J.E. Maxwell Residence, 211 S. Avenue 52, 1991
- #541 – Reverend Williel Thomson Residence, 215 S. Avenue 52, 1991
- #549 – Highland Theatre, 5604 N. Figueroa Street, 1991
- #558 – Department of Water and Power Distributing Station No. 2, 211-235 N. Avenue 61, 1992
- #564 – E.A. Spencer Estate, 5660 Ash Street, 1992
- #575 – Security Trust and Savings Bank, 5601 N. Figueroa Street, 1993
- #581 – York Boulevard State Bank, 1301-1313 N. Avenue 51, 1993
- #582 – W.F. Poor Residence, 120 N. Avenue 54, 1993
- #585 – Occidental College Hall of Letters Building (Savoy Apartments), 121 N. Avenue 50, 1993
- #780 – Murdock Residence, 4219 N. Figueroa Street, 2004
- #781 – Mills Cottage, 4746 Toland Way, 2004
- #877 – Wilkins House, 915 North Avenue 57, 2007
- #1071 – York Boulevard Church of Christ, 4908 York Boulevard, 2015
- #1107 – Coughlin House, 1501 Nolden Street, 2016
- #1233 – Centro de Arte Publico, 5605-5607 N. Figueroa Street, 2021
- #1234 – Mexicano Art Center, 5337-41 N. Figueroa Street, 2021
- #1279 – Mexico-Tenochitlan: The Wall that Talks, 100-120 N. Avenue 61 & 6029 N. Figueroa St, 2023

== Education ==
Highland Park is zoned to the following schools in the Los Angeles Unified School District.

Zoned elementary schools include:

- Aldama Elementary School
- Annandale Elementary School
- Buchanan Elementary School
- Bushnell Way Elementary School
- Garvanza Elementary School
- San Pascual Elementary School
- Saint Ignatius of Loyola School (K-8)
- Toland Way Elementary School
- Yorkdale Elementary School
- Monte Vista Elementary School
- Arroyo Seco Museum Science Magnet School (K-8)

Residents are zoned to Luther Burbank Middle School and Benjamin Franklin High School. Los Angeles International Charter High School and Academia Avance Charter also serve the community.

== Notable people ==
- Isaac Colton Ash, City Council member, 1925–27
- Maggie Baird, actress and screenwriter
- Jackie Beat, drag performer and comedian
- Beck, musician
- Jackson Browne, musician
- Rose La Monte Burcham (1857–1944), medical doctor and mining executive whose Highland Park house still stands
- Zack de la Rocha, musician
- Rocky Delgadillo, City Attorney of Los Angeles, 2001–2009
- Daryl Gates, police chief from 1971 to 1992
- Billie Eilish, musician, singer-songwriter
- Che Flores, basketball referee
- Edward Furlong, actor
- John C. Holland, Los Angeles City Council member, 1943–67, businessman
- Diane Keaton, Academy Award-winning actress, brought up in Highland Park
- Mike Kelley, artist
- Marc Maron, comedian and actor
- Finneas O’Connell, singer-songwriter, record producer, musician, and actor
- Ariel Pink, musician
- Fritz Poock, artist
- Cora Scott Pond Pope, real estate developer of the Mt. Angelus area of Highland Park
- Skrillex, musician
- Emily Wells, musician
- David Weidman, silkscreen artist and animation background painter
- Miles Heizer, actor
- Marilyn Ferguson, New Age author and publisher
- Colm Tóibín, Irish novelist
- Dan Hentschel, online comedian

== In popular culture ==
Motion pictures that have been shot in Highland Park include:

- Reservoir Dogs
- The Lincoln Lawyer – location for the bar The York on York
- Gangster Squad – In early 2012 the entire Highland Park downtown area along Figueroa Street was redone to look like post-WWII-era Los Angeles for the film.
- Yes Man
- Cyrus
- Tuff Turf
- Ford v Ferrari
- Wonder Man (TV series)

Television and feature films have used the old Los Angeles Police Department building in the 6000 block of York Boulevard.

Smith Estate, an historic hilltop Victorian house, has been a shooting location for horror films such as Spider Baby, Silent Scream and Insidious: Chapter 2.

== See also ==
- Los Angeles Historic-Cultural Monuments on the East and Northeast Sides
- List of districts and neighborhoods of Los Angeles
