= Che Flores =

American basketball referee (born 1979)

- Born: July 18, 1979 (age 47); Los Angeles, California, US
- Education: California State University, Northridge
- Occupation: Basketball referee
- Years active: 2022–present
- Employer: National Basketball Association

Che Flores (born July 18, 1979) is an American referee in the National Basketball Association who wears uniform number 91. They are the first official to work National Collegiate Athletic Association, NBA G League, and Women's National Basketball Association championship games in the same year, and the first out non-binary transgender official in a major North American professional sports league.

== Early life ==
Che Flores was born July 18, 1979 in Los Angeles, California. They were raised in the Highland Park neighborhood as the eldest of three siblings. Their mother is Costa Rican and their father is Mexican American. They played basketball at Bellarmine-Jefferson High School, winning a state title their senior year. They played basketball at a junior college before transferring to the Cal State Northridge Matadors women's basketball program. They received a full athletic scholarship to Cal State and served as the team captain. Flores graduated in 2002.

== Career ==
In 2003, Flores began officiating high school basketball games in San Gabriel, California. They were working year-round for the NCAA, G League, and WNBA by 2012. From July 2020 to March 2021, they refereed championship games in each of those leagues, becoming the first person to do so in a single year. They became an NBA official in 2022. By October 2023, Flores had worked ten championship games, and came out as the first nonbinary trans referee in the NBA or any major professional sports league in North America.

== Personal life ==
Flores came out as trans and non binary in September 2022. They came out as lesbian to their family at age 19, but "that word never felt right with" them. Flores uses they/them pronouns.
