= Highland Park Police Station =

- U.S. National Register of Historic Places
- Los Angeles Historic-Cultural Monument
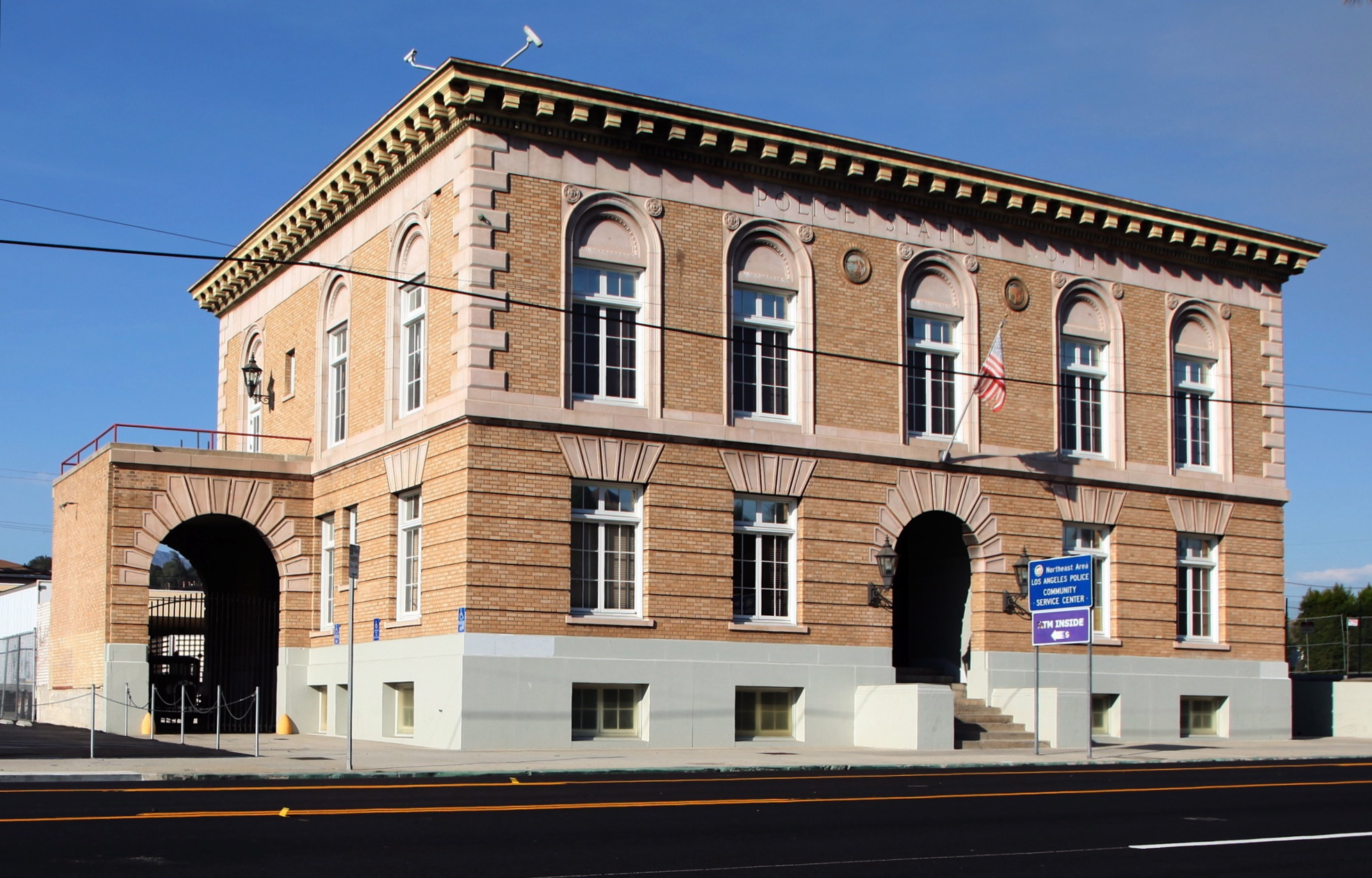
- Highland Park Police Station, 2007

- Location within the Los Angeles metropolitan area Location within California Location within the United States
- Location: 6045 York Blvd., Highland Park, Los Angeles, California, USA
- Coordinates: 34°7′8″N 118°11′12″W
- Built: 1926
- Architectural style: Late 19th And 20th Century Revivals
- NRHP reference No.: 84000874
- LAHCM No.: 274

Significant dates
- Added to NRHP: March 22, 1984
- Designated LAHCM: January 4, 1984

The Highland Park Police Station on York Boulevard in the Highland Park neighborhood of Los Angeles, California is the city's oldest surviving police station. Closed in 1983, the station is now operated as the Los Angeles Police Museum. It has been designated as a Historic Cultural Monument and listed on the National Register of Historic Places.

== History ==
Built from 1925 to 1926 at a cost of $100,000, the station opened in April 1926 in a ceremony attended by Chief Edgar Davis and Police Commissioners Birnbaum, Insley and Webster.

A number of big cases were handled out of the Highland Park station; it was there that Det. Robert Grogan pursued the "Hillside Stranglers", Angelo Buono, Jr. and Kenneth Bianchi. In the early 1980s, the building was cited for failure to meet seismic safety standards and was described as a "Shake and Bake Hellhole". The radical Symbionese Liberation Army (the group that kidnapped Patty Hearst and engaged in an infamous shootout with the LAPD in 1974) planted a bomb in the Highland Park Station in 1973, but it proved to be a dud. In 1942, future LAPD Chief Daryl Gates was arrested and briefly held at the Highland Park station after punching a police officer; in 1963, Gates returned as a police captain in command of the station. He later wrote, "Never dreaming I would voluntarily return to the station where I'd been brought in for punching a cop, I showed up for work, eager to continue trying out my talents as a boss."

The station was closed in 1983 as the Los Angeles Police Department moved its Northeast Division to a new location. With the vacant station threatened by demolition, the Los Angeles Cultural Heritage Commission declared the building a Historic Cultural Monument (HCM #274) in January 1984; it was added to the National Register of Historic Places two months later in March 1984. It is the only precinct police station in California listed on the National Register. (The City of San Diego Police Headquarters, Jails and Courts building is also registered.)

As late as 1985, the city considered several proposals to convert the building to commercial office and retail space, a live theater and restaurant.

In June 2025, the Police Museum was vandalized due to unrest in the city due to ICE raids. An anonymous donor stepped forward with a $4,000 donation to help repair the building, which had been graffitied, though as of August 10, 2025, the museum remained boarded up. The museum had no affiliation with housing ICE agents, according to a post on the museum's social media, stating "the Los Angeles Police Museum is not being used by ICE, nor has it ever been. We do not and will not allow ICE to use our facility for any purpose—now or in the future."

=== Television production ===
Because it is Los Angeles' last surviving station built in the 1920s, the building has been sought after as a filming location. The city's motion picture coordination office scheduled reservations by film and TV crews several months in advance. The building has also been used in television as an establishing shot for the Mathnet (1987–88) and Pawnee (2011) police stations, and others. The building also appears in Police Academy 6: City Under Siege (1989)

== Los Angeles Police Museum ==
The building now houses the Los Angeles Police Museum, including photographs, uniforms, badges, squad cars, a paddy wagon, and bullet-riddled vehicles. The museum chronicles the formation of the LAPD from its beginnings in 1869 to the present day. The original jail cells of the Highland Park Police Station can be viewed along with a reproduction of the first police woman's uniform in the nation worn by LAPD officer Alice Stebbins Wells in 1910. Records preserved by the Los Angeles Police Historical Society at the museum include LAPD annual reports, LAPD yearbooks, and The Beat magazines. The museum is open Wednesdays through Saturdays from 10:30 am to 3:30 pm.

== See also ==
- Los Angeles Historic-Cultural Monuments on the East and Northeast Sides
- List of Registered Historic Places in Los Angeles
- History of the Los Angeles Police Department
