= Temple Beth Israel of Highland Park and Eagle Rock =

Synagogue in Los Angeles, California, United States

- Location in Los Angeles

Religion
- Affiliation: Judaism
- Rite: Conservative AND Reform Synagogue
- Ecclesiastical or organizational status: Synagogue
- Leadership: No Rabbi; Lay-led only
- Status: Active

Location
- Location: 5711 Monte Vista Street, Highland Park, Los Angeles, California
- Country: United States
- Interactive map of Temple Beth Israel of Highland Park and Eagle Rock
- Coordinates: 34°06′44″N 118°11′39″W

Architecture
- Type: Synagogue architecture
- Style: Spanish Colonial Revival
- Established: 1923 (as a congregation)
- Completed: 1930
- Construction cost: $4,078

Website
- tbila.org

Temple Beth Israel of Highland Park and Eagle Rock is a Conservative Jewish congregation and synagogue, located at 5711 Monte Vista Street in Highland Park, Los Angeles, California.

First organized as the Highland Park Hebrew School Association in 1923, the congregation completed construction of its Spanish Colonial Revival style building in 1930, at a cost of $4,078 (today $79,000). It is the oldest synagogue in Los Angeles exclusively operating in its original location. From July 2023-June 2026, Rabbi Alex Weisz served as the Senior Rabbi of Temple Beth Israel, making him the first Gen Z rabbi serving as the spiritual leader of an American synagogue.

As of July 2026, TBI’s board voted in favor of pursuing a lay-led model. An effort will be made to try and continue providing normal programming without a rabbi. Weekly emails, social media updates, life cycle events, tots programming, monthly meals, Torah studies, learning opportunities will now be handled by the board and select lay-leaders. Religious school is expected to continue as planned.
