= The Ultimate Alphabet =

Book by Mike Wilks

The cover of The Ultimate Alphabet (Second Edition)

The Ultimate Alphabet (ISBN 1-85145-050-5) is a best-selling book by Mike Wilks. It is a collection of 26 paintings, each depicting a collection of objects starting with a particular letter of the alphabet. It was published in 1986 as a competition with a £10 000 prize, closing in 1988. Unlike children's alphabet books, it contains unusual words, and is extremely intricately painted, with the paintings in a realistic style, but rendered surrealistic by the strange juxtaposition of subject matter. Wilks himself appears at least once in every painting, as does his trademark snail. Some of Wilks's appearances are less prominent than others; the hardest to spot is in the "W" painting, where he appears (representing, of course "Wilks") in a tiny cameo on a reproduction of the cover of his earlier book Weather Works.

Each letter is itself represented several times, typically in braille, morse code, semaphore, and sign language as well as in its printed form.

According to Wilks the book contained depictions of 7,777 words in total, ranging from just 30 for the letter X to 1,229 for the letter S, taking a total of 18,000 hours to complete. A single object may be described by more than one word beginning with the same letter: for instance, a dalmatian is also a dog and a witch is also a woman. Conversely, the same word may refer to more than one class of object: thus the leg of a tripod and the leg of a human being count as two separate words, and the image for S depicts five different meaning of the word scale. However, as Wilks points out in his Introduction, "anyone with expertise in any particular subject will certainly be able to identify more in these images than I have intentionally included".

For competition purposes the book was accompanied by The Ultimate Alphabet Workbook, a smaller, saddle-stitched volume containing a checklist of 12,000 words: the 7,777 words depicted in the paintings plus 4,223 that were not. Contestants were to receive one point for each correct word checked, but would lose two points for each incorrect word; in addition, any entry with fifty or more checked incorrect words would be automatically disqualified. The winner was to be the contestant with the highest number of points, regardless of whether they correctly identified all of the words. Additional workbooks were available for purchase by mail order. Completed workbooks were to be submitted by post, to be received before April 1, 1988.

The cover of The Annotated Ultimate Alphabet

In 1988, after the competition had closed, Wilks produced The Annotated Ultimate Alphabet (ISBN 1-85145-174-9), an answer book in which the paintings were accompanied by numbered line drawings referencing numbered lists of the words depicted together with brief definitions. These lists also incorporate several sketches of some relevant objects. As he had predicted, between the two editions Wilks had discovered a number of words he had omitted from his original list, bringing the total up to 7,825 (and that of the most prolific letter, S, to 1,234); and this did not include several more words discovered by readers that were too late to include in the lists.

A number of omissions are still apparent. For instance the A painting includes a statue of Adam (which is listed), depicted with a prominent Adam's apple (which is not); likewise, an aeroplane is not also identified as an aircraft or airplane. The letter B contains a listing for belly but not belly button, while under F a flying saucer is not listed as a flying disk or foo fighter. There are almost certainly many other additional words that do not appear in the official list.

The Ultimate Alphabet was the first book in Wilks' 'Ultimate' trilogy. The other books are The Ultimate Noah's Ark (ISBN 0-7181-3596-2) and The Ultimate Spot-The-Difference Book (ISBN 0-670-87856-1). This last title was published in North America as Metamorphosis (ISBN 0-670-87666-6).

The Ultimate Alphabet Game was released in June 2010 for the iPad, by Toytek, a UK-based independent games developer.

== Reviews ==
- Games #85
