= Judge Wilkins =

Judge Wilkins may refer to:

- Philip Charles Wilkins (1913–1998), judge of the United States District Court for the Eastern District of California
- Robert L. Wilkins (born 1963), judge of the United States Court of Appeals for the District of Columbia Circuit
- Ross Wilkins (1799–1872), judge of the United States District Courts for the District of Michigan and for the Eastern District of Michigan
- William Wilkins (American politician) (1779–1865), judge of the United States District Court for the Western District of Pennsylvania
- William Walter Wilkins (born 1942), judge of the United States Court of Appeals for the Fourth Circuit

== See also ==
- Robert Nugen Wilkin (1886–1973), judge of the United States District Court for the Northern District of Ohio
- Justice Wilkins (disambiguation)
