= Wilks =

Wilks is a surname. Notable people with the name include:

- Alan Wilks (born 1946), English footballer
- Alwyne Wilks (1906–1980), English footballer
- Bobby Wilks (1931–2009), American Coast Guard aviator
- Brian Wilks (born 1966), ice hockey player
- Clement Wilks (1819–1871), Australian civil engineer
- Christine Wilks (born 1960), British digital artist and writer
- Dan and Farris Wilks, American businessmen
- Eileen Wilks (born 1952), American author
- George Wilks (1908–1981), British motorcycle speedway rider
- Guy Wilks (born 1981), British rally driver
- Hector Wilks (1919–1992), English botanist
- Ivor Wilks (1928–2014), British historian
- James Wilks (born 1978), English mixed martial arts fighter
- Jim Wilks (born 1958), American football player
- John Wilks (1776–1854), English politician
- Jonathan Wilks (born 1967), British diplomat
- Mark Wilks (1759–1831), Manx soldier
- Maurice Wilks (1904–1963), British car designer
- Mike Wilks (author) (born 1947), English artist, illustrator and author
- Mike Wilks (basketball) (born 1979), American basketball player
- Robert Wilks (c.1665–1732), British actor and theatrical manager
- Samuel S. Wilks, American mathematician and statistician
- Samuel Wilks (1824–1911), British physician
- Steve Wilks (born 1969), American football player and coach
- Suzie Wilks (born 1970), Australian TV celebrity
- Ted Wilks (1915–1989), American baseball player
- Terrell Wilks (born 1989), American sprinter
- William Wilks (1843–1923), British horticulturalist
- William Wilks (Australian politician) (1863?–1940)
- Yorick Wilks (1939–2023), British computer scientist

== Fictional characters ==
- Henry Wilks, in the Emmerdale soap opera

== See also ==
- Wilkes (surname)
- Wilk, surname
- Martin v. Wilks
- Wilks Coefficient
- Wilks' lambda distribution
