= Wojciech Wilk =

Polish politician

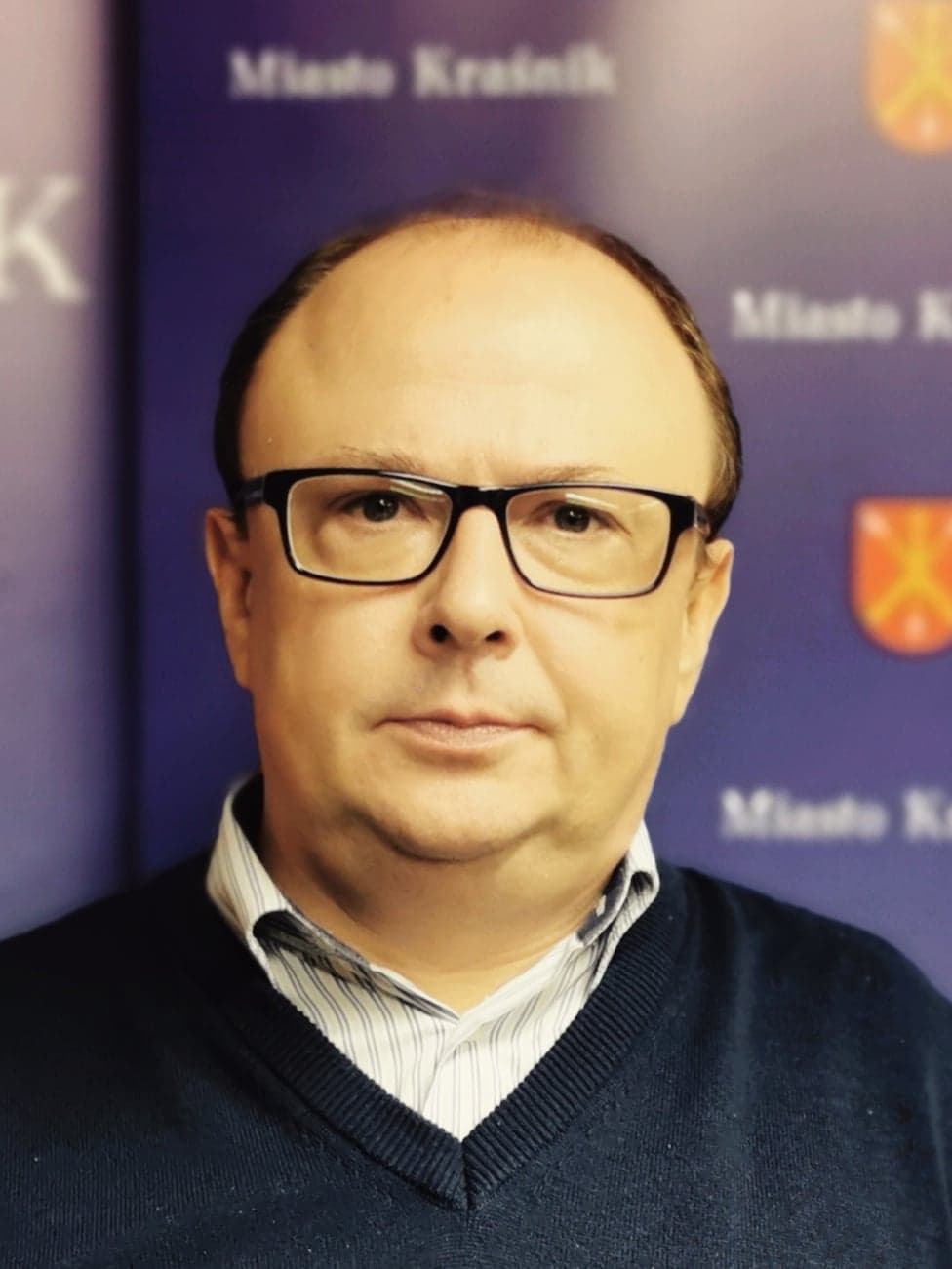
- Wojciech Wilk

Member of the Sejm
- Incumbent
- Assumed office 25 September 2005
- Constituency: 6 – Lublin

Personal details
- Born: 1972 (age 53–54)
- Party: Civic Platform

Wojciech Wilk (born 12 August 1972 in Kraśnik) is a Polish politician. He was elected to the Sejm on 25 September 2005, getting 5,501 votes in 6 Lublin district as a candidate from the Civic Platform list.

== See also ==
- Members of Polish Sejm 2005-2007
- Wilk – people with the surname Wilk
