= Justice Wilkins =

Justice Wilkins may refer to:

- D. Frank Wilkins (1924–2006), associate justice of the Utah Supreme Court
- Herbert P. Wilkins (born 1930), chief justice of the Massachusetts Supreme Judicial Court
- Michael J. Wilkins (born 1948), associate justice of the Utah Supreme Court
- Raymond Sanger Wilkins (1891–1971), associate justice of the Massachusetts Supreme Judicial Court

== See also ==
- Judge Wilkins (disambiguation)
- Justice Wilkin (disambiguation)
