= Wilkins House (Los Angeles) =

House in Los Angeles, California, United States

- Location: 915–917 North Avenue 57, Los Angeles
- Coordinates: 34.120376°N 118.193445°W
- Area: Highland Park
- Built: 1911
- Architectural style: American Craftsman

Los Angeles Historic-Cultural Monument
- Designated: July 3, 2007
- Reference no.: 877

Wilkins House is a building that was listed as a Los Angeles Historic-Cultural Monument in 2007. The LA Office of Historic Resources described it upon designation as...

Built for John Wilkins in 1911 in the Highland Park community of northeast Los Angeles, the house is emblematic of Craftsman style architecture. The purity of the design of the Wilkins house and retention of its original form make it a significant example of the Craftsman style that helped define Los Angeles'[s] residential architecture.
