= Andrea Wilkens =

German footballer

Personal information
- Full name: Andrea Wilkens
- Date of birth: 16 October 1984 (age 42)
- Place of birth: Meppen, West Germany
- Height: 1.68 m (5 ft 6 in)
- Position: Midfielder

Senior career*
Years	Team	Apps	(Gls)
2003–	Wolfsburg	138	(3)
- * Club domestic league appearances and goals

Andrea Wilkens (born October 16, 1984) is a German former football midfielder who played for VfL Wolfsburg in the Bundesliga. In 2014, she celebrated the end of her footballing career by playing a testimonial match in which she assembled her own 'dream team' to compete against a team assembled by Conny Pohlers, also formerly of Wolfsburg.
