= Wickens =

Wickens is a surname, and may refer to:

- Aryness Joy Wickens (1901–1991), American statistician and wife of David L. Wickens
- David L. Wickens (1890–1970), South Dakota State Senator and husband of Aryness Joy Wickens
- George Michael Wickens (1918–2006), British-Canadian academic specialising in Persian Culture
- Gerald Ernest Wickens (1927–2019), British botanist
- Jodie Wickens (born 1982), Canadian politician
- Brian Wickens (born in 1947), a New Zealand wrestler
- Paul Wickens (born in 1956), British musician
- Robert Wickens (born in 1989), Canadian racing driver

== See also ==
- Wicken (disambiguation)
- Wilkens
