= USS Wilkes =

USS Wilkes may refer to:

- USS Wilkes (TB-35), a torpedo boat which served around the turn of the 20th century
- USS Wilkes (DD-67), a destroyer which served during World War I
- USS Wilkes (DD-441), a destroyer which served during World War II

== See also ==
- USS Wilkes-Barre
- Charles Wilkes
