= Wilczyn =

Wilczyn may refer to the following places in Poland:

- Wilczyn, Polkowice County in Lower Silesian Voivodeship (south-west Poland)
- Wilczyn, Lublin Voivodeship (east Poland)
- Wilczyn, Greater Poland Voivodeship (west-central Poland)
