= Glenn Wilkes Jr. =

American basketball coach

Glenn Wilke Jr. is an American collegiate level basketball coach, with 700 victories in 33 seasons. He initially started coaching in Winter Park, Florida an NCAA Division II school. He is currently a coach for the Rollins College's women's basketball team. where he has a 700–252 record. His father, Glenn Wilkes Sr., is a Hall of Fame basketball coach.

== See also ==
- List of college women's basketball career coaching wins leaders
