= Glenn Wilkes =

American college basketball coach (1928–2020)

Biographical details
- Born: November 28, 1928; Eatonton, Georgia, U.S.
- Died: November 21, 2020 (aged 91)

Playing career
- 1946–1950: Mercer

Coaching career (HC unless noted)
- 1952–1957: Brewton–Parker JC
- 1957–1993: Stetson

Administrative career (AD unless noted)
- 1968–1990: Stetson

Head coaching record
- Overall: 551–436 (college)
- Tournaments: 2–4 (NAIA); 3–4 (NCAA College Division); 4–6 (TAAC)
- College Basketball Hall of Fame; Inducted in 2014

Glenn Newton Wilkes (November 28, 1928 – November 21, 2020) was an American college basketball coach and athletics administrator. He served as the head men's basketball coach at Stetson University in DeLand, Florida from 1957 to 1993 and was the school's athletic director from 1968 to 1990. Known as the Godfather of Florida basketball, Wilkes was inducted into the National Collegiate Basketball Hall of Fame in 2014.

Wilkes attended Mercer University, where he played college basketball from 1946 to 1950. At Stetson, he had over 550 wins along with 27 winning seasons.

Wilkes wrote a book called Basketball. His son, Glenn Wilkes Jr., is the head women's basketball coach at Rollins College in Winter Park, Florida. His grandson, Wyatt, plays college basketball at Florida State University.

== Head coaching record ==
=== College ===
Record table
Season	Team	Overall	Conference	Standing	Postseason
Stetson Hatters (NCAA College Division independent) (1957–1961)
1957–58	Stetson	14–11			NAIA Second Round
1958–59	Stetson	17–11			
1959–60	Stetson	16–13			NAIA First Round
1960–61	Stetson	20–7			
Stetson Hatters (Florida Intercollegiate Conference) (1961–196)
1961–62	Stetson	16–12	4–6		NAIA First Round
1962–63	Stetson	15–13	7–3		NAIA Second Round
1963–64	Stetson	16–9	7–1		
1964–65	Stetson	16–10	6–2		
1965–66	Stetson	13–12	5–1		
1966–67	Stetson	17–10	5–1		NCAA College Division Regional Fourth Place
1967–68	Stetson	8–18	1–5		
Stetson Hatters (NCAA College Division independent) (1968–1971)
1968–69	Stetson	14–12			
1969–70	Stetson	22–7			NCAA College Division Quarterfinal
1970–71	Stetson	19–9			NCAA College Division Regional Third Place
Stetson Hatters (NCAA University Division / Division I independent) (1971–1986)
1971–72	Stetson	6–20			
1972–73	Stetson	15–11			
1973–74	Stetson	17–9			
1974–75	Stetson	22–4			
1975–76	Stetson	17–9			
1976–77	Stetson	15–12			
1977–78	Stetson	14–13			
1978–79	Stetson	15–12			
1979–80	Stetson	15–12			
1980–81	Stetson	18–9			
1981–82	Stetson	12–15			
1983–84	Stetson	19–9			
1983–84	Stetson	19–9			
1984–85	Stetson	12–16			
1985–86	Stetson	10–18			
Stetson Hatters (Trans America Athletic Conference) (1986–1993)
1986–87	Stetson	18–13	13–5	T–2nd	
1987–88	Stetson	13–15	8–10	T–5th	
1988–89	Stetson	17–12	10–8	3rd	
1989–90	Stetson	15–17	8–8	5th	
1990–91	Stetson	15–16	9–5	T–3rd	
1991–92	Stetson	11–17	6–8	T–5th	
1992–93	Stetson	14–13	6–6	4th	
Stetson:		551–436	95–69		
Total:		551–436			
