= Rose La Monte Burcham =

American physician and mining company executive

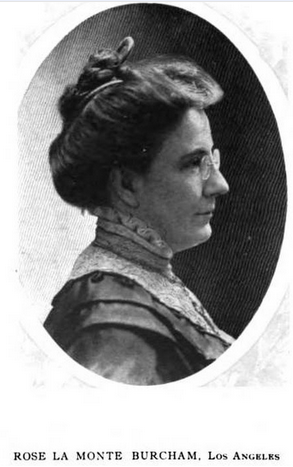
Rose La Monte Burcham, from a 1910 publication.

Rose La Monte Burcham (August 28, 1857 – February 2, 1944) was an American physician and mining company executive based in Southern California.

== Early life and education ==
Rose Victoria La Monte was born in Dansville, Steuben County, New York, the daughter of James La Monte and Eliza Pratt La Monte. Her father was a medical doctor; both of her parents were born in England and emigrated to the United States after the birth of the first child in 1832. Rose was their last child, born when James and Eliza were 46 and 44, respectively.

Rose La Monte earned her medical degree at the Eclectic Medical Institute of Cincinnati in 1884.

== Career ==
Rose La Monte moved west for her own health in 1885. She settled in San Bernardino, California, where she became the first woman physician in the city. She invested in real estate, including orange groves. She was a member of the Ebell Club in Los Angeles and of the Southern California Academy of Science. She also served on the board of directors of the Fine Arts League.

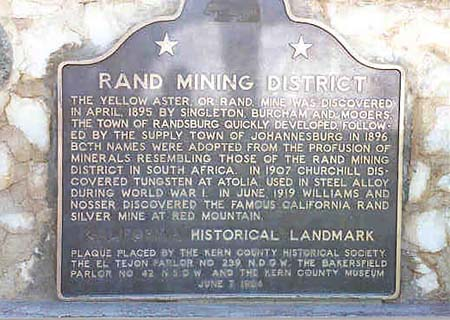
Randsburg Mining District Historical Marker (6925132316), mentioning the founders of the Yellow Aster mine as "Singleton, Burcham, and Mooers"

In 1895 Burcham funded her husband's search for gold in the Mojave Desert. The search was successful, and Rose La Monte Burcham moved to Randsburg, California to be secretary and business manager of the Yellow Aster Mining and Milling Company. She was the sole living original officer of the company after 1914 and kept the Yellow Aster mine operating for four years on her own until she sold it in 1918. She was described as "a woman of remarkable acumen and executive ability," by a contemporary writer. In 1904, the Los Angeles Times counted her as a "Man of Achievement" in California.

== Personal life ==
Rose La Monte married California rancher Charles Austin Burcham in 1887. She was widowed when he died in 1913. She died in 1944, aged 86 years. Her gravesite is at Inglewood Lake Cemetery in Los Angeles; a home she lived in still stands, in the Highland Park neighborhood of the city.
