= James Wilkes (disambiguation) =

James Wilkes (born 1958) is an American former basketball player.

James Wilkes may also refer to

- Jimmy Wilkes (1925–2008), American baseball player
- Jim Wilkes (born 1950), American lawyer

== See also ==
- James Wilks (born 1978), English mixed martial arts fighter
- Jim Wilks (born 1958), American football player
