= Justice Wilkin =

Justice Wilkin may refer to:

- J. Foster Wilkin (1853–1914), associate justice of the Ohio Supreme Court
- Jacob W. Wilkin (1837–1907), associate justice and chief justice of the Supreme Court of Illinois
- Robert Nugen Wilkin (1886–1973), associate justice of the Supreme Court of Ohio

== See also ==
- Justice Wilkins (disambiguation)
