= John Wilkes (disambiguation) =

John Wilkes (1725–1797) was an English radical journalist and politician.

John Wilkes may also refer to:

- John Wilkes (banker), founder of the First National Bank of Charlotte
- John Wilkes (printer) (1750–1810), English printer, bookseller and stationer
- John Wilkes (archaeologist) (born 1936), British archaeologist and academic
- John E. Wilkes (1895–1957), vice admiral, U.S. Navy
- John Vaughan Wilkes (1902–1986), English educationalist and Anglican priest
- John Wilkes (train), the name given to a passenger train of the Lehigh Valley Railroad

== See also ==
- John Wilkes Booth (1838–1865), American actor, known for assassinating president Abraham Lincoln at Ford's Theatre in 1865
- John Wilks (1776–1854), English Whig Party politician
- John Wilkes Booze, American rock band
