= Automotive Tooling Systems v Wilkens =

South African legal case

Automotive II Tooling Systems v Wilkens
- Court: Supreme Court of Appeal of South Africa
- Full case name: Automotive Tooling Systems (PTY) LTD v Sarel Johannes Wilkens and Five Others
- Decided: 28 September 2006
- Citations: [2006] SCA 128 (RSA); Case No. 581/05
- Transcript

Court membership
- Judges sitting: Farlam, Nugent, Lewis, Maya JJA and Cachalia AJA

Case opinions
- Decision by: Cachalia AJA

Keywords
- Restraint of trade covenant

Automotive II Tooling Systems (Pty) Ltd v Wilkens & others was an important case in South African labour law, in which the Supreme Court of Appeal of South Africa confirmed the principle that a restraint of trade would be considered unreasonable and contrary to public policy, and thus unenforceable, if it does not protect some legally recognisable interest of the employer and merely seeks to exclude or eliminate competition.

The court further pointed out that the dividing line between the use by an employee of his own skill, knowledge and experience, which he cannot be restrained from using, and the use of his employer's trade secrets or confidential information or other interest, which he may not disclose if bound by a restraint, is often very difficult to define. What must be clear, according to the court, is that the interest is one that might properly be described as belonging to the employer rather than to the employee, and in that sense "proprietary to the employer."

== Background ==
In this particular case, the business of the appellant was in a specialised technological field relating to the design, manufacture and/or customisation of special-purpose machines and tooling. The respondents had been employed as skilled toolmakers. They concluded a restraint of trade and confidentiality clause with the appellant. The respondents subsequently resigned and took up employment with the third respondent. The respondents did the same work for the third respondent that they had done for the appellant.

== Arguments ==
The appellant claimed to have a proprietary interest in the know-how acquired by the respondents and sought to interdict them, relying on the restraint of trade clause.

The respondents denied the proprietary interest claimed and contended that the relevant know-how acquired by the first and second respondents was neither confidential nor specific to the appellant's business but was commonly available to artisans and technicians. As a result, it was argued that the knowledge formed part of the first and second respondents' stock of general knowledge, skill and experience, with which they were entitled to earn their living in any other business.

== Judgment ==
The SCA pointed out that the mere fact that former employees take up employment with a competitor does not in itself entitle the appellant (the former employer) to any relief if all they will be doing is to apply their skills and knowledge acquired whilst in the employ of the appellant.

The court dismissed the appeal on the basis that the appellant had failed to establish a proprietary interest that might legitimately be protected, concluding that the restraint was inimical to public policy and therefore unenforceable.
