= Wilken =

Wilken is a surname. Notable people with the surname include:

- Aud Wilken (born 1965), Danish singer
- Brock Wilken (born 2002), American baseball player
- Charles Wilken (1866–1956), Danish actor
- Claudia Ann Wilken (born 1949), United States federal judge
- Dorothy Wilken (born 1936), American politician
- Friedrich Wilken (1777–1840), German librarian, historian and orientalist
- Hermann Wilken (1522–1603), German humanist and mathematician
- Patrick Wilken (born 1966), Australian scientist and editor
- Robert Louis Wilken (1936–2026), American historian, academic and Lutheran minister
- Stewart Wilken (born 1966), South African serial killer

== See also ==
- Wilkens
- Wilkin
- Wiken
