= Mike Wilks (author) =

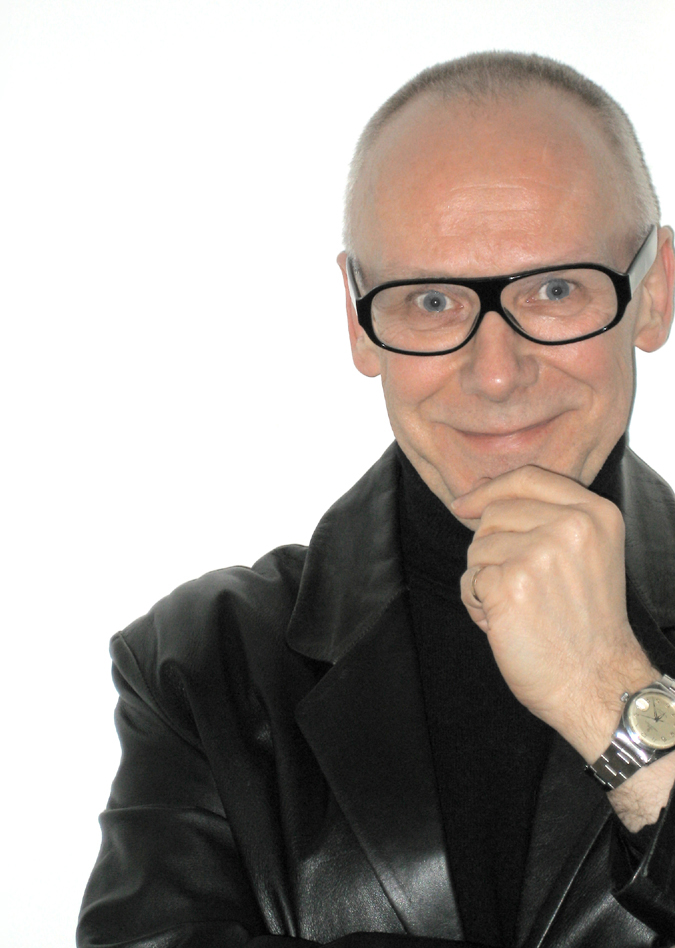
Mike Wilks

Mike Wilks (born 1947, London) is an artist, illustrator and author of nine books including the global bestseller The Ultimate Alphabet (Pavilion Books, 1987), which was a New York Times bestseller and Sunday Times bestseller for 57 weeks with over 750 000 copies sold worldwide.

Mike Wilks won a scholarship to art school at the age of thirteen. After running his own successful design consultancy for several years, he devoted his time to painting and writing. In 1990, Mike Wilks was the subject of an award-winning documentary on BBC television. His original paintings and drawings, which have a surreal and dreamlike quality with an unsettling undertone, have been acquired by the Museum of Modern Art in New York and the Victoria and Albert Museum in London, as well as many private collections.

His first novel, Mirrorscape, is a fantasy adventure set in the land of Nem, a parallel world where the bizarre is commonplace and everyday logic is in abeyance. Two more Mirrorscape books have since been published. The three form the Mirrorscape Trilogy. The second book, Mirrorstorm, focuses on Mel, Wren and Ludo (the main characters) and their journey back into the Mirrorscape. The third book, Mirrorshade, published in late 2009, is the last in the trilogy, and is about the same three, but facing worse troubles than ever before.

== Bibliography ==
- (with Alan Sillitoe) The Incredible Fencing Fleas (1978)
- (with Brian Aldiss) Pile: Petals from Saint Klaed's Computer (1979)
- (with Sarah Harrison) In Granny's Garden (1980)
- The Weather Works (1983) (new edition, 2016)
- The Ultimate Alphabet (1986) (new edition, 2015)
- The Annotated Ultimate Alphabet (1988) (new edition, 2015)
- The BBC Drawing Course (1990)
- The Ultimate Noah's Ark (1993)
- The Ultimate Spot-The-Difference Book ("Metamorphosis" in the USA and Australia) (1997)
- Mirrorscape (2007)
- Mirrorstorm (2009)
- Mirrorshade (2010)
- (with Thomas Hobbes) Leviathan (2012)

== About Mike Wilks ==
- Mike Wilks: Making His Mark. BBC TV Film (1990. Director: Dick Foster, 30 minutes duration).
- Mike Wilks: Paintings, Drawings, Illustrations 1977–1997 (published 1997) by Michael Heseltine with an introduction by Sir Tim Rice.
