= Wilkinson (surname) =

Wilkinson is an English surname of Norman origin. It is a variant of Williamson, derived from a variant of William, Wilkin, brought to the Anglo-Scottish border during the Norman Conquest. At the time of the British Census of 1881, the relative frequency of the surname Wilkinson was highest in Westmorland (4.3 times the British average), followed by Yorkshire, County Durham, Lincolnshire, Cumberland, Northumberland, Lancashire, Cheshire and Nottinghamshire. People named Wilkinson include:

== A ==
- A. H. Wilkinson (1875–1954), American politician
- Adrienne Wilkinson, American actress
- Alan Wilkinson (RAF officer) (1891–1972), British flying ace
- Alec Wilkinson (born 1952), American writer
- Alex Wilkinson (born 1984), Australian soccer player
- Alfred Robert Wilkinson VC (1896–1940), British soldier
- Amanda Wilkinson (born 1982), Canadian country singer
- Amandah Wilkinson (born 1987/88), New Zealand-Australian pop musician
- Andrew Wilkinson (disambiguation), several people
- Anne Wilkinson (poet) (1910–1961), Canadian poet and writer

== B ==
- Ben Wilkinson (poet) (born 1985), English poet
- Ben Wilkinson (born 1987), English footballer
- Billy Wilkinson (born 1951), Scottish footballer
- Bob Wilkinson (born 1978), RAF armourer, later, MPGS Patrol Commander.
- Brian Wilkinson (1938–2026), Australian swimmer
- Bruce Wilkinson, American Christian teacher and writer
- Bud Wilkinson (1916–1994), American football player, coach, broadcaster and politician

== C ==
- Carol Wilkinson (died 1977), murder victim
- Carole Wilkinson (born 1950), Australian writer
- Charles Wilkinson (disambiguation), multiple people
- Chris Wilkinson (disambiguation), multiple people
- Colm Wilkinson (born 1944), Irish actor
- Crystal Wilkinson, African-American feminist writer
- Corinne Wilkinson, voice actor

== D ==
- Dan Wilkinson (born 1973), American football player
- David Wilkinson (disambiguation), several people
- Denys Wilkinson (1922–2016), British nuclear physicist
- Dot Wilkinson (1921–2023), American softball and bowling player

== E ==
- Ed or Edward Wilkinson (disambiguation), several people
- Elizabeth Wilkinson (fl. 1722–1733), English boxer
- Ellen Wilkinson (1891–1947), British Labour Party politician
- Endymion Wilkinson (born 1941), British sinologist and diplomat
- Ernest L. Wilkinson (1899–1978), American academic administrator, president of Brigham Young University
- Ernie Wilkinson (born 1947), English footballer
- Eugene P. Wilkinson (1918–2013), United States Navy admiral

== F ==
- Fanny Wilkinson (1855–1951), British gardener and landscape designer
- Frank Wilkinson (1914–2006), American civil liberties activist
- Freddy Wilkinson (1878-?), English footballer
- Fred Wilkinson (footballer) (1889-?), English footballer
- Fred Wilkinson (speedway rider) (1906–1978), British speedway rider

== G ==
- Gary Wilkinson (disambiguation), several people
- Gavin Wilkinson (born 1973), New Zealand soccer player and manager
- Geoffrey Wilkinson (1921–1996), English chemist and Nobel Prize winner
- George Wilkinson (disambiguation), several people
- Gina Wilkinson (1960–2010), Canadian actress, director, and playwright
- Glen Wilkinson (born 1959), Australian professional snooker player
- Grant Wilkinson (born 1974), British criminal

== H ==
- Hannah Wilkinson (born 1992), New Zealand soccer player
- Herb Wilkinson (1923–2026), American basketball player
- Howard Wilkinson (born 1943), English soccer player and manager
- Hubert Wilkinson (1897–1984), English Anglican priest

== J ==
- J. L. Wilkinson (1878–1964), American baseball team owner
- Jack Wilkinson (disambiguation), several people
- Jacob Wilkinson (c. 1719–1799), English businessman and politician
- James Wilkinson (disambiguation), several people
- Jane Herbert Wilkinson Long (1798–1880), Texas pioneer
- Jazmine Wilkinson (born 2002), Canadian soccer player
- Jeannette Wilkinson (1841–1886), English suffragist and trade unionist
- Jemima Wilkinson (1752–1819), American charismatic preacher
- Jim Wilkinson (disambiguation), several people
- Jo Wilkinson (disambiguation), several people
- Jane or Joan Wilkinson (died 1556), English silkwoman and Protestant reformer
- Joan Wilkinson (1919–2002), English cricketer
- Joe Wilkinson (disambiguation), several people
- John Wilkinson (disambiguation), several people
- Jonathan Wilkinson (footballer) (1859–1934), English footballer
- Jonathan Wilkinson (born 1965), Canadian politician
- Jonny Wilkinson (born 1979), English rugby union player
- Joseph Wilkinson (disambiguation), several people
- June Wilkinson (1940–2025), English model and actress

== K ==
- Kate Wilkinson (actress) (1916–1993), American actress
- Kate Wilkinson (politician) (born 1957), New Zealand politician
- Katharine Wilkinson (fl. 21st century), American writer and climate change activist
- Keith Wilkinson (reporter), British television reporter
- Keith Wilkinson (cricketer) (born 1950), English cricketer
- Kendra Wilkinson (born 1985), American model
- Kevin Wilkinson (1958–1999), English drummer

== L ==
- Laura Starr Ware Wilkinson (1843–1921), American home economist
- Laura Wilkinson (born 1977), American diver
- Leah Wilkinson (born 1986), British field hockey player
- Len Wilkinson (1916–2002), English cricketer
- Lisa Wilkinson (born 1959), Australian television presenter and journalist
- Louis Wilkinson (1881–1966), British novelist

== M ==
- Marian Wilkinson (born 1954), Australian journalist and author
- Marianne Wilkinson, Canadian politician
- Mark Wilkinson (disambiguation), several people
- Martha Wilkinson (1941–2014), American literacy campaigner; First Lady of Kentucky (1987–1991)
- Mary Wilkinson (1909–2001), English scholar of German literature and culture
- Michael Wilkinson (disambiguation), several people
- Monty Wilkinson (footballer) (1908–1979), English footballer
- Monty Wilkinson (lawyer), American lawyer
- Morton S. Wilkinson (1819–1894), American politician

== N ==
- Naomi Wilkinson (born 1974), English TV presenter
- Neil Wilkinson (disambiguation)
- Neville Wilkinson (1869–1940), British Army officer, officer of arms, author and doll-house designer
- Nicholas Browne-Wilkinson (1930–2018), English jurist
- Norman Wilkinson (1878–1971), English artist

== O ==
- Oliver Green-Wilkinson (1913–1970), English Anglican bishop
- Ollie Wilkinson (born 1944), Irish politician
- Ollie Wilkinson (born 1996), British racing driver

== P ==
- Patrick Wilkinson (scholar) (1907–1985), English classical scholar
- Paul Wilkinson (political scientist) (1937–2011), British political scientist
- Paul Wilkinson (footballer) (born 1964), English footballer
- Percival Wilkinson (1848–c. 1891), English rugby union player
- Percival Spearman Wilkinson (1865–1953), British Army general
- Peter Wilkinson (disambiguation), several people
- Philip Wilkinson (disambiguation), several people
- Pinckney Wilkinson (c.1693–1784), British merchant and politician

== R ==
- R. J. Wilkinson (1846–1914), English bookseller and songwriter
- Raven Wilkinson (1935–2018), American ballerina
- Ray Wilkinson (1925–2004), American radio news anchor and reporter
- Rhian Wilkinson (born 1982), Canadian soccer player and coach
- Richard Wilkinson (disambiguation), several people
- Robert Wilkinson (disambiguation), several people
- Rodney Wilkinson, who sabotaged the South African Koeberg Nuclear Power Station in 1982
- Roma Wilkinson (1918–2013), American songwriter
- Rorden Wilkinson (born 1970), British author and academic
- Rose Wilkinson (1885–1968), Canadian politician
- Roy Wilkinson (baseball) (1893–1956), American baseball player
- Roy Wilkinson, British music journalist
- Ruth Wilkinson (1901–1985), New Zealand community leader and local historian

== S ==
- Sarah Scudgell Wilkinson (1779–1831), English writer of children's books
- Scott Wilkinson, known as Yan, member of English alternative rock band Sea Power
- Sharon P. Wilkinson (born 1947), American diplomat
- Shaun Wilkinson (born 1981), English footballer
- Signe Wilkinson (born 1950), American editorial cartoonist
- Simon Wilkinson (transmedia artist), British transmedia artist
- Smith S. Wilkinson (1824–1889), American lawyer and politician
- Spenser Wilkinson (1853–1937), English writer, professor of military history
- Stephen Wilkinson (1919–2021), British choral conductor and composer
- Stephen Wilkinson (born 1978), known as Bibio, English musician and producer
- Steve Wilkinson (disambiguation), several people
- Stuart Wilkinson (cricketer) (born 1942), English cricketer
- Stuart Wilkinson (rugby league) (born 1960), English rugby league football player and coach
- Sue Wilkinson (singer) (1943–2005), British singer and songwriter
- Sue Wilkinson (professor), British feminist academic and advocate for same-sex marriage
- Suzanne Jane Wilkinson, New Zealand engineering academic

== T ==
- Tate Wilkinson (1739–1803), English actor and manager
- Theodore Stark Wilkinson (Louisiana) (1847–1921), American politician
- Theodore Stark Wilkinson (1888–1946), U.S. Navy admiral
- Thomas Wilkinson (disambiguation) or Tom Wilkinson, several people
- Tim Wilkinson (translator) (1947–2020), English translator of Hungarian
- Tim Wilkinson (born 1978), New Zealand golfer
- Toby Wilkinson (born 1969), English Egyptologist
- Tony Wilkinson (1948–2014), British archaeologist and academic
- Tracey Wilkinson (fl. 21st century), English actress
- Trevor Wilkinson (disambiguation), several people
- Tudor Wilkinson (1879–1969), American art collector and dealer

== V ==
- Vicky Wilkinson (born 1983), English professional boxer

== W ==
- Wallace Wilkinson (1941–2002), American businessman and politician
- Walter Wilkinson (disambiguation), several people
- Wilkie Wilkinson (1903–2001), British mechanic, founder member of the British Racing Mechanics Club
- William Wilkinson (disambiguation), several people
- Winston Wilkinson (badminton) (died 2014), Irish badminton player
- Winston Wilkinson (government official) (born 1944), American politician

== See also ==
- Wilkinson (disambiguation)
- Wilkerson
- Wilkins (disambiguation)
- Mr. Wilkinson's Widows
