= John Wilkinson =

John Wilkinson may refer to:

== Politicians ==
- John Denison (MP) (John Wilkinson, c. 1758–1820), British MP for Wootton Bassett 1796–1802, for Colchester 1802–1806, and for Minehead 1807–1812
- John Alexander Wilkinson (1789–1862), judge and political figure in Upper Canada
- John Wilkinson (Florida politician) (1848–1891), state legislator during the Reconstruction era
- John Wilkinson (Australian politician) (1853–?), Member of the New South Wales Legislative Assembly 1889–1895
- John Wilkinson (British politician) (1940–2014), Conservative Party
- John Wilkinson (Canadian politician) (active since 1999), Canadian politician from Ontario
- John Wilkinson (Georgia politician) (born 1955), state senator from Georgia (U.S. state)
- John Wilkinson Jr., American state legislator in Florida

== Sports ==
- John Wilkinson (Gloucestershire cricketer) (1876–1948), English cricketer
- John Wilkinson (Scottish footballer) (1886–1918), Scottish footballer
- John Wilkinson (footballer, born 1887), English footballer for Manchester City
- John Wilkinson (Worcestershire cricketer) (1892–1967), English cricketer
- John Wilkinson (Watford footballer) (active 1921–1924), English footballer of the 1920s
- John Wilkinson (ice hockey) (1911–1970), Canadian professional ice hockey player
- John Wilkinson (footballer, born 1949) (1949–2007), English footballer
- John Wilkinson (footballer, born 1979), Singaporean/British footballer playing in the S.League
- John Wilkinson (football manager), manager of Grantham Town F.C. from 1999 to 2003

== Others ==
- John Wilkinson (Hebraist) (1588–1650), English churchman and academic
- John Wilkinson (industrialist) (1728–1808), British industrialist who suggested the use of iron for many roles
- John Wilkinson (1780–1796), American colonist, first son of James Wilkinson
- John Gardner Wilkinson (1797–1875), English traveller, writer and pioneer Egyptologist
- John Wilkinson (Syracuse pioneer) (1798–1862), lawyer and first postmaster, named the Syracuse city, son of the colonist
- John Wilkinson (CSN) (1821–1891), officer in the Confederate States Navy, commanded CSS Chickamauga
- John F. N. Wilkinson (1832–1912), American librarian
- John Grimshaw Wilkinson (1856–1937), British botanist
- John Wilkinson (Franklin automobile) (1868–1951), invented the Franklin automobile air-cooled engine, grandchild of the Syracuse pioneer
- John Frederick Wilkinson (1897–1998), British physician and medical researcher
- John Wilkinson (sound engineer) (1920–2002), American sound engineer and Academy Award winner
- John Donald Wilkinson (1929–2018), Anglican priest and Bible scholar
- John C. Wilkinson (active since 1964), academic scholar on Islamic studies
- John Wilkinson (entrepreneur) (active 1982–2013), British steel businessman and chairman of Salford City Reds Rugby League Club
- John Wilkinson (guitarist) (1945–2013), American rhythm guitarist with Elvis Presley's TCB Band
- John Wilkinson (poet) (born 1953), British poet
- John Wilkinson (chemist) (born 1961), introduced the first degree (BSc) course in herbal medicine in the UK

== See also ==
- Jack Wilkinson (disambiguation)
- Jonny Wilkinson (born 1979), English rugby union player
