= 1977 Gillette Cup =

English cricket tournament

- Administrator: Test and County Cricket Board
- Cricket format: Limited overs cricket (60 overs per innings)
- Tournament format: Knockout
- Champions: Middlesex (1st title)
- Participants: 22
- Matches: 21
- Most runs: 263 Brian Davison (Leicestershire)
- Most wickets: 11 Mike Selvey (Middlesex)
- Official website: CricketArchive tournament page

The 1977 Gillette Cup was the fifteenth Gillette Cup, an English limited overs county cricket tournament. It was held between 29 June and 3 September 1977. The tournament was won by Middlesex County Cricket Club who defeated Glamorgan County Cricket Club by 5 wickets in the final at Lord's.

== Format ==
The seventeen first-class counties, were joined by five Minor Counties: Bedfordshire, Cornwall, Durham, Hertfordshire and Northumberland. Teams who won in the first round progressed to the second round. The winners in the second round then progressed to the quarter-final stage. Winners from the quarter-finals then progressed to the semi-finals from which the winners then went on to the final at Lord's which was held on 3 September 1977.

=== First round ===
29 June 1977
(scorecard)

Bedfordshire; 111 all out (57.4 overs)	v	Northumberland; 112/1 (46.3 overs)
David Daniels 20; John Woodford 2/16 (6 overs)		John Woodford 56*

Northumberland won by 9 wickets
Wardown Park, Luton
Umpires: John Langridge & Barrie Meyer
Player of the match: John Woodford (Northumberland)

29 June 1977
(scorecard)

Lancashire; 180/8 (60 overs)	v	Cornwall; 62 all out (44.1 overs)
Barry Wood 49; David Toseland 3/27 (12 overs)		Christopher Chaplin 22; Peter Lee 4/7 (10 overs)

Lancashire won by 118 runs
Boscawen Park, Truro
Umpires: Alan Whitehead & Peter Wight
Player of the match: Barry Wood (Lancashire)

29 June 1977
(scorecard)

Nottinghamshire; 215 all out (58.4 overs)	v	Hampshire; 220/0 (45.1 overs)
Basher Hassan 79; John Rice 4/37 (10 overs)		Gordon Greenidge 106*

Hampshire won by 10 wickets
County Ground, Southampton
Umpires: Cec Pepper & Dusty Rhodes
Player of the match: Gordon Greenidge (Hampshire)

29, 30 June 1977
(scorecard)

Kent; 226 all out (60 overs)	v	Middlesex; 227/8 (59.5 overs)
John Shepherd 101; Allan Jones 5/23 (8 overs)		Mike Gatting 62; Bernard Julien 4/45 (11.5 overs)

Middlesex won by 2 wickets
St Lawrence Ground, Canterbury
Umpires: Jack Crapp & Peter Rochford
Player of the match: John Shepherd (Kent)

- Match was scheduled for one day but extended to two.

29 June 1977
(scorecard)

Leicestershire; 313/5 (60 overs)	v	Hertfordshire; 159/9 (60 overs)
David Gower 117*; Alan Garofall 2/53 (12 overs)		David Ottley 54*; Chris Balderstone 4/33 (10 overs)

Leicestershire won by 154 runs
Grace Road, Leicester
Umpires: Ron Aspinall & Arthur Jepson
Player of the match: David Gower (Leicestershire)

29 June 1977
(scorecard)

Durham; 151 all out (58.2 overs)	v	Northamptonshire; 152/7 (57.4 overs)
Peter Birtwisle 59 (123); Alan Hodgson 3/18 (11 overs)		Richard Williams 51 (155); Stuart Wilkinson 5/24 (12 overs)

Northamptonshire won by 3 wickets
County Ground, Northampton
Umpires: Don Oslear & Eddie Phillipson
Player of the match: Stuart Wilkinson (Durham)

=== Second round ===
13 July 1977
(scorecard)

Leicestershire; 225/7 (60 overs)	v	Essex; 138 all out (53.1 overs)
Brian Davison 99; John Lever 2/20 (12 overs)		Brian Hardie 35; John Steele 5/19 (12 overs)

Leicestershire won by 87 runs
Southchurch Park, Southend-on-Sea
Umpires: Tom Brooks & Jack Crapp
Player of the match: John Steele (Leicestershire)

13, 14 July 1977
(scorecard)

Gloucestershire; 241/5 (60 overs)	v	Northamptonshire; 244/8 (59.2 overs)
Alastair Hignell 85*; Alan Hodgson 3/48 (12 overs)		Mushtaq Mohammad 89; Mike Procter 3/36 (12 overs)

Northamptonshire won by 2 wickets
Phoenix County Ground, Bristol
Umpires: Sam Cook & Jack van Geloven
Player of the match: Mushtaq Mohammad (Northamptonshire)

- Match was scheduled for one day but extended to two.

13, 14 July 1977
(scorecard)

Hampshire; 261 all out (60 overs)	v	Yorkshire; 175 all out (53.3 overs)
Trevor Jesty 69; Arnie Sidebottom 4/36 (11 overs)		Arnie Sidebottom 45; John Rice 5/35 (11.3 overs)

Hampshire won by 86 runs
Dean Park Cricket Ground, Bournemouth
Umpires: Lloyd Budd & Arthur Jepson
Player of the match: John Rice (Hampshire)

- Match was scheduled for one day but extended to two.

13, 14 July 1977
(scorecard)

Lancashire; 193 all out (54.2 overs)	v	Surrey; 194/6 (51.5 overs)
Clive Lloyd 86; Geoff Arnold 4/15 (9.2 overs)		Intikhab Alam 42*; Jack Simmons 2/30 (12 overs)

Surrey won by 4 wickets
Old Trafford, Manchester
Umpires: Ken Palmer & Alan Whitehead
Player of the match: Clive Lloyd (Lancashire)

- Match was scheduled for one day but extended to two.

13, 14 July 1977
(scorecard)

Middlesex; 221/7 (60 overs)	v	Warwickshire; 190 all out (57.2 overs)
Mike Brearley 82; Steve Perryman 3/35 (12 overs)		David Brown 41; John Emburey 2/31 (12 overs)

Middlesex won by 31 runs
Lord's, London
Umpires: John Langridge & Don Oslear
Player of the match: Mike Brearley (Middlesex)

- Match was scheduled for one day but extended to two.

13, 14 July 1977
(scorecard)

Northumberland; 153/8 (60 overs)	v	Somerset; 154/5 (38.4 overs)
Stephen Greensword 26; Dennis Breakwell 2/39 (12 overs)		Ian Botham 91*; Ian Callen 3/50 (12 overs)

Somerset won by 5 wickets
County Ground, Taunton
Umpires: David Evans & Peter Wight
Player of the match: Ian Botham (Somerset)

- Match was scheduled for one day but extended to two.

13 July 1977
(scorecard)

Sussex; 169/8 (60 overs)	v	Derbyshire; 173/1 (51.3 overs)
John Barclay 44; Eddie Barlow 3/33 (12 overs)		John Wright 87*; Mike Buss 1/22 (8 overs)

Derbyshire won by 9 wickets
County Ground, Hove
Umpires: Peter Rochford & Douglas Sang Hue
Player of the match: Eddie Barlow (Derbyshire)

13 July 1977
(scorecard)

Worcestershire; 213/9 (60 overs)	v	Glamorgan; 217/6 (60 overs)
David Humphries 58; Tony Cordle 4/42 (12 overs)		Arthur Francis 62*; Cedric Boyns 3/36 (10 overs)

Glamorgan won by 4 wickets
New Road, Worcester
Umpires: Ray Julian & Eddie Phillipson
Player of the match: Arthur Francis (Glamorgan)

=== Quarter-finals ===
3 August 1977
(scorecard)

Somerset; 248/4 (60 overs)	v	Derbyshire; 189 all out (54.5 overs)
Brian Rose 128; Eddie Barlow 1/25 (12 overs)		John Wright 37; Joel Garner 5/30 (11.5 overs)

Somerset won by 59 runs
Rutland Recreation Ground, Ilkeston
Umpires: Ron Aspinall & Ray Julian
Player of the match: Brian Rose (Somerset)

3 August 1977
(scorecard)

Surrey; 199 all out (59.2 overs)	v	Glamorgan; 200/6 (56.2 overs)
John Edrich 53; Malcolm Nash 2/22 (8 overs)		Collis King 55; Geoff Arnold 1/14 (10.2 overs)

Glamorgan won by 4 wickets
Sophia Gardens (cricket ground), Cardiff
Umpires: David Halfyard & Cec Pepper
Player of the match: Alan Jones (Glamorgan)

3 August 1977
(scorecard)

Hampshire; 247/7 (60 overs)	v	Middlesex; 248/3 (55.5 overs)
Trevor Jesty 54*; Mike Selvey 3/48 (12 overs)		Michael Smith 123; Tom Mottram 2/42 (10.5 overs)

Middlesex won by 7 wickets
Lord's, London
Umpires: Sam Cook & Douglas Sang Hue
Player of the match: Michael Smith (Middlesex)

3 August 1977
(scorecard)

Northamptonshire; 228/9 (60 overs)	v	Leicestershire; 231/5 (57.3 overs)
Geoff Cook 95; Peter Booth 5/33 (11 overs)		Brian Davison 80; Alan Hodgson 4/32 (12 overs)

Leicestershire won by 5 wickets
County Ground, Northampton
Umpires: David Evans & Dusty Rhodes
Player of the match: Geoff Cook (Northamptonshire)

=== Semi-finals ===
17, 18, 19 August 1977
(scorecard)

Leicestershire; 172/7 (60 overs)	v	Glamorgan; 175/5 (57.3 overs)
David Gower 43; Gwyn Richards 2/17 (12 overs)		John Hopkins 63; Jack Birkenshaw 2/21 (12 overs)

Glamorgan won by 5 wickets
St. Helen's, Swansea
Umpires: Bill Alley & Ken Palmer
Player of the match: John Hopkins (Glamorgan)

- Match was scheduled for one day but extended to three.

17, 18, 19 August 1977
(scorecard)

v

Match abandoned
Lord's, London

- Match was scheduled for one day but extended to three. Match was rescheduled for 24 August.

24, 25, 26 August 1977
(scorecard)

Somerset; 59 all out (14.4 overs)	v	Middlesex; 61/4 (11.3 overs)
Graham Burgess 12; Wayne Daniel 4/24 (7.4 overs)		Clive Radley 23; Joel Garner 4/27 (6 overs)

Middlesex won by 6 wickets
Lord's, London
Umpires: Bill Alley & Ken Palmer
Player of the match: Wayne Daniel (Middlesex)

- Match was scheduled for one day but extended to three.

=== Final ===
3 September 1977
(scorecard)

Glamorgan; 177/9 (60 overs)	v	Middlesex; 178/5 (55.4 overs)
Mike Llewellyn 62; Norman Featherstone 3/17 (6 overs)		Clive Radley 85*; Malcolm Nash 2/31 (12 overs)

Middlesex won by 5 wickets
Lord's, London
Umpires: David Constant & Tom Spencer
Player of the match: Clive Radley (Middlesex)
