= Wilkinson =

Wilkinson or Wilkinsons may refer to:

== Businesses and brands ==
- Wilko, formerly Wilkinson Hardware, a British retail chain
- Wilkinson Sword, a British manufacturer of razor blades, formerly swords, motorbikes and other products
  - Wilkinson TMC, their touring motorcycle model built 1911 to 1916
- Wilkinson plc, a British firm of chandelier manufacturers and repairers

== People ==
- Wilkinson (surname), including a list of people
- Wilkinson (musician), an English musician
- Wilkinson baronets, a British hereditary title
- The Wilkinsons, a Canadian country music trio
  - The Wilkinsons (TV series)

== Places ==
- Wilkinson County, Georgia, U.S.
- Wilkinson, Illinois, U.S.
- Wilkinson, Indiana, U.S.
- Wilkinson, Minnesota, U.S.
  - Wilkinson Township, Cass County, Minnesota, the wider area
- Wilkinson, Mississippi, U.S.
  - Wilkinson County, Mississippi, the wider county
- Wilkinson, West Virginia, U.S.
- Wilkinson, Wisconsin, U.S.
- Wilkinson Lake, in Minnesota, U.S.
- Wilkinson River, in New Zealand's South Island

== Other uses ==
- Wilkinson, a type of analog-to-digital converter
- Wilkinson Microwave Anisotropy Probe, a NASA spacecraft 2001–2010
- Wilkinson, a GWR 3031 Class rail locomotive, 1895–1914

== See also ==
- Wilkinson Creek (disambiguation)
- Wilkinson v. United States, a law case heard by the US Supreme Court
- Wilkinson's catalyst, a chemical catalyst
- Wilkinson's polynomial, in numerical analysis
- Wilkinson power divider, an RF signal splitter with special properties
