= Stuart Wilkinson =

Stuart Wilkinson may refer to:

- Stuart Wilkinson (cricketer) (born 1942), former English cricketer
- Stuart Wilkinson (rugby league) (born 1960), English rugby league football coach and former player
- Stuart Wilkinson, drummer for Dumdums and Foregone Conclusion

== See also ==
- Wilkinson (surname)
