= Robert Demming =

Trinidadian born former cricketer

Personal information
- Full name: Robert Oliver Demming
- Born: 5 May 1949 (age 77); Trinidad
- Batting: Right-handed
- Bowling: Right-arm fast-medium

Domestic team information
- Years: Team
- 1972–1977: Bedfordshire

Career statistics
Competition	List A
Matches	2
Runs scored	34
Batting average	17.00
100s/50s	0/0
Top score	17
Catches/stumpings	1/–
- Source: Cricinfo, 2 August 2011

Robert Oliver Demming (born 5 May 1949) is a Trinidadian born former cricketer. Demming was a right-handed batsman who bowled right-arm fast-medium.

Demming studied at Durham University, where he was captain of the cricket club and also played as a striker for the university football team.

He made his debut for Bedfordshire against Shropshire in the 1972 Minor Counties Championship. He played Minor counties cricket for Bedfordshire from 1972 to 1977, making 38 Minor Counties Championship appearances. He made his List A debut against Lancashire in the 1973 Gillette Cup. He was dismissed for 17 runs by Jack Simmons in Bedfordshire's innings, a match which Lancashire won by 127 runs. He made a further List A appearance against Northumberland in the 1977 Gillette Cup. In this match, he was dismissed for 17 runs by John Woodford, with Northumberland winning by 9 wickets.

Demming was also an excellent rugby player and a prolific try scorer for Bedford on the right wing. He scored 73 tries, including seven hat-tricks, in 147 appearances, represented England 'B' as well as having a final England trial. He scored two tries in Bedford's 28-12 victory over Rosslyn Park in the RFU Knockout Cup final in 1975.
