= 1977 Benson & Hedges Cup =

- Administrator: Test and County Cricket Board
- Cricket format: Limited overs cricket (55 overs per innings)
- Champions: Gloucestershire (1st title)
- Participants: 20
- Matches: 47 (48)
- Most runs: 351 Roger Knight (Sussex)
- Most wickets: 15 Brian Brain (Gloucestershire)

The 1977 Benson & Hedges Cup was the sixth edition of cricket's Benson & Hedges Cup. The competition was won by Gloucestershire County Cricket Club.

== Fixtures and results ==
=== Group stage ===
==== Group A ====
| Team | Pld | W | L | NR | Pts | BowSR |
|---|---|---|---|---|---|---|
| Hampshire | 4 | 3 | 1 | 0 | 9 | 35.485 |
| Gloucestershire | 4 | 3 | 1 | 0 | 9 | 45.667 |
| Lancashire | 4 | 2 | 2 | 0 | 6 | 38.824 |
| Leicestershire | 4 | 1 | 3 | 0 | 3 | 47.074 |
| Somerset | 4 | 1 | 3 | 0 | 3 | 51.304 |

==== Group B ====
| Team | Pld | W | L | NR | Pts | BowSR |
|---|---|---|---|---|---|---|
| Glamorgan | 4 | 3 | 1 | 0 | 9 | 32.286 |
| Warwickshire | 4 | 3 | 1 | 0 | 9 | 37.441 |
| Derbyshire | 4 | 2 | 1 | 1 | 7 | 38.393 |
| Worcestershire | 4 | 1 | 2 | 1 | 4 | 61.905 |
| Minor Counties West | 4 | 0 | 4 | 0 | 0 | 57.05 |

==== Group C ====
| Team | Pld | W | L | NR | Pts | BowSR |
|---|---|---|---|---|---|---|
| Sussex | 4 | 3 | 1 | 0 | 9 | 34.6 |
| Kent | 4 | 3 | 1 | 0 | 9 | 38.697 |
| Surrey | 4 | 2 | 2 | 0 | 6 | 35.484 |
| Nottinghamshire | 4 | 2 | 2 | 0 | 6 | 37.677 |
| Oxford and Cambridge Universities | 4 | 0 | 4 | 0 | 0 | 64.444 |

==== Group D ====
| Team | Pld | W | L | NR | Pts | BowSR |
|---|---|---|---|---|---|---|
| Middlesex | 4 | 4 | 0 | 0 | 12 | 27.243 |
| Northamptonshire | 4 | 3 | 1 | 0 | 9 | 36.206 |
| Yorkshire | 4 | 2 | 2 | 0 | 6 | 40.935 |
| Essex | 4 | 1 | 3 | 0 | 3 | 53.944 |
| Minor Counties East | 4 | 0 | 4 | 0 | 0 | 52.5 |

=== Quarter-finals ===
8 June 1977
(scorecard)

| Glamorgan; 209/8 (55 overs) | v | Hampshire; 210/4 (42 overs) |
| Mike Llewellyn 54; Trevor Jesty 3/20 (11 overs) | | Trevor Jesty 105*; Gwyn Richards 2/35 (4 overs) |

Hampshire won by 6 wickets
St Helen's, Swansea
Umpires: John Langridge & Peter Rochford
Player of the match: Trevor Jesty (Hampshire)

8 June 1977
(scorecard)

| Gloucestershire; 194/7 (55 overs) | v | Middlesex; 176 all out (52.1 overs) |
| Zaheer Abbas 64; Wayne Daniel 1/18 (11 overs) | | Mike Smith 41; Mike Procter 3/15 (9.1 overs) |

Gloucestershire won by 18 runs
County Ground, Bristol
Umpires: Cec Pepper & Douglas Sang Hue
Player of the match: David Shepherd (Gloucestershire)

8 June 1977
(scorecard)

| Sussex; 264/5 (55 overs) | v | Kent; 268/4 (52.1 overs) |
| Roger Knight 91; John Shepherd 2/60 (11 overs) | | Chris Cowdrey 114; Tony Greig 2/48 (11 overs) |

Kent won by 6 wickets
St Lawrence Ground, Canterbury
Umpires: Dickie Bird & Dusty Rhodes
Player of the match: Chris Cowdrey (Kent)

8 June 1977
(scorecard)

| Northamptonshire; 196 all out (54.3 overs) | v | Warwickshire; 179/9 (55 overs) |
| David Steele 60; Bill Bourne 3/53 (11 overs) | | David Smith 36; Jim Griffiths 4/36 (11 overs) |

Northamptonshire won by 17 runs
County Ground, Northampton
Umpires: Bill Alley & Barrie Meyer
Player of the match: Sarfraz Nawaz (Northamptonshire)

=== Semi-finals ===
22 June 1977
(scorecard)

| Gloucestershire; 180 all out (54.2 overs) | v | Hampshire; 173 all out (54.3 overs) |
| Sadiq Mohammad 76; Tom Mottram 3/21 (10 overs) | | Nigel Cowley 59; Mike Procter 6/13 (11 overs) |

Gloucestershire won by 7 runs
County Ground, Southampton
Umpires: David Constant & Tom Spencer
Player of the match: Mike Procter (Gloucestershire)

22 June 1977
(scorecard)

| Kent; 211/6 (55 overs) | v | Northamptonshire; 206/7 (55 overs) |
| Asif Iqbal 65*; Alan Hodgson 3/58 (10 overs) | | David Steele 64; Bob Woolmer 3/29 (11 overs) |

Kent won by 5 runs
County Ground, Northampton
Umpires: Lloyd Budd & John Langridge
Player of the match: Bob Woolmer (Kent)

=== Final ===
16 July 1977
(scorecard)

| Gloucestershire; 237/6 (55 overs) | v | Kent; 173 all out (47.3 overs) |
| Andy Stovold 71; Bernard Julien 2/51 (11 overs) | | John Shepherd 55; Brian Brain 3/9 (7.3 overs) |

Gloucestershire won by 64 runs
Lord's, London
Umpires: Dickie Bird & Lloyd Budd
Player of the match: Andy Stovold (Gloucestershire)

== See also ==
Benson & Hedges Cup
