= Blackwater River State =

Blackwater River State may refer to:

- Blackwater River State Forest, Florida
- Blackwater River State Park, Florida
