= Toseland =

Toseland may refer to:

- Toseland, Cambridgeshire, a village in England

== People with the surname ==
- David Toseland, English cricketer
- Ernie Toseland, English footballer
- Geoff Toseland (1931–2019), English footballer
- James Toseland, English motorcycle racer
