= Otahite =

Otahite or Otaheite may refer to:

- Otaheite, the former name of Tahiti
- Otahite, a Florida ghost town in what is now Blackwater River State Forest
- Otaheite cane, a variety of sugar cane
- Otaheite Apple, name for Malay apple
