= Charles Wilkinson =

Charles Wilkinson may refer to:

- Charles Wilkinson (MP) (1725–1782), English Member of Parliament
- Charles Edmund Wilkinson (1807–1870), acting Governor of British Ceylon
- Charles Wilkinson (cricketer) (1813–1889), English cricketer and clergyman
- Charles Wilkinson (priest) (1823–1910), Archdeacon of Totnes
- Charles Smith Wilkinson (1843–1891), Australian geologist
- Charles Wilkinson (New Zealand politician) (1868–1956), New Zealand politician
- Charlie Wilkinson (footballer) (1907–1975), English footballer with Leeds United, Sheffield United and Southampton
- Bud Wilkinson (Charles Burnham Wilkinson, 1916–1994), American football player and coach
- Charles Wilkinson (director), Canadian film and television director
- Charley Wilkinson (born 1955), American musician
