= Fred Wilkinson =

Fred Wilkinson may refer to:

- Fred Wilkinson (footballer) (1889–?), British footballer
- Fred Wilkinson (speedway rider) (1906–1978), British speedway rider

== See also ==
- Frederick Wilkinson (1896–1980), Bishop of Toronto
- Frederick Green Wilkinson (1825–1913), British Army officer
- Freddy Wilkinson (1878–?), English footballer
