= David Wilkinson =

David Wilkinson may refer to:

- David Wilkinson (chemical engineer), Canadian chemical engineer
- David Wilkinson (machinist) (1771–1852), American inventor
- David Wilkinson (scientist), Canadian scientist
- David Wilkinson (political scientist) (born 1939), American political scientist
- David Wilkinson (theologian) (born 1963), British theologian
- David Wilkinson (judoka) (born 1973), Australian judoka
- David Todd Wilkinson (1935–2002), American cosmologist
- David L. Wilkinson (1936–2022), Attorney General of Utah, 1981–1989
