= Steamobile =

Defunct American motor vehicle manufacturer

Trinity Cycle Manufacturing Company Steamobile Company of America
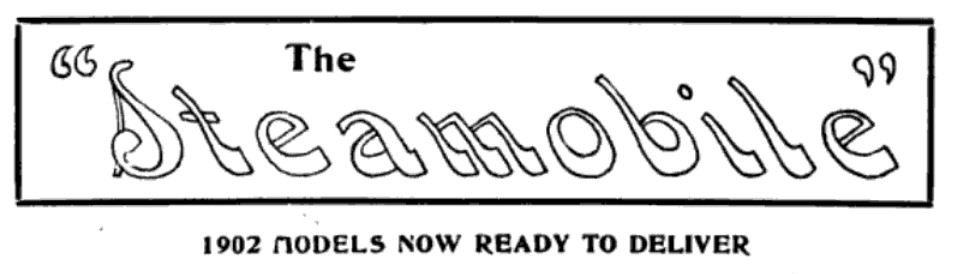
- Steamobile logo from advertisement

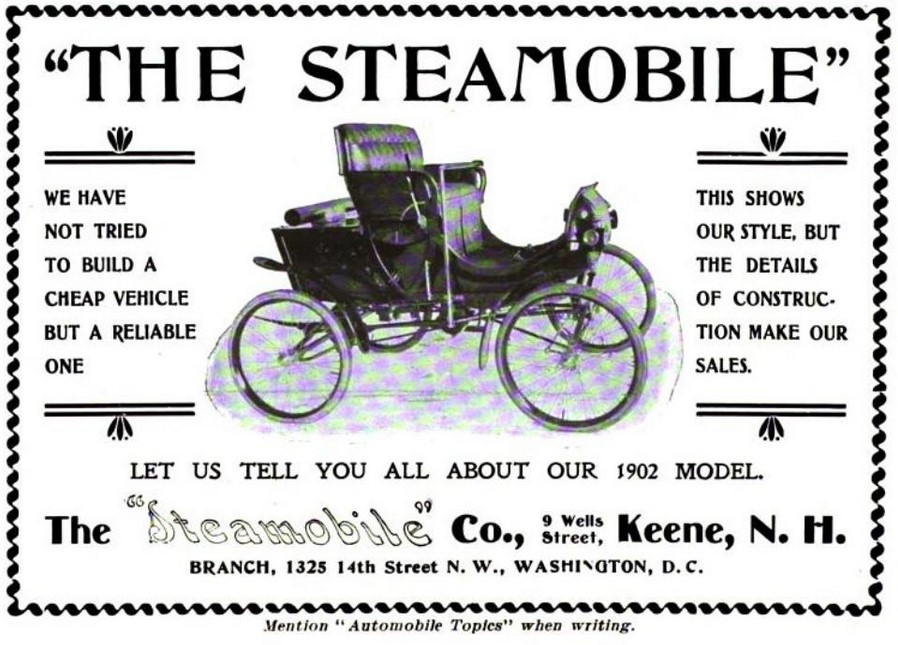
- 1901 Steamobile advertisement from Automobile Topics
- Industry: Automotive
- Founded: 1900; 126 years ago
- Defunct: 1902; 124 years ago
- Fate: Sold
- Headquarters: Keene, New Hampshire, United States
- Key people: Reynald Janney, E. P. Wells, Winfield S. Rogers
- Products: Steam car
- Production output: unknown (1900-1902)
- Brands: Steamobile

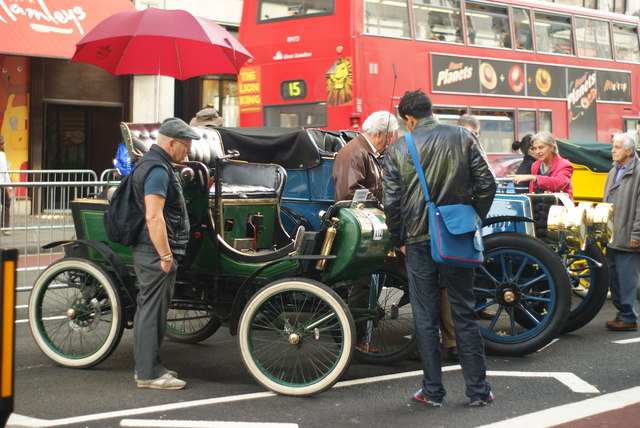
1901 Steamobile Stanhope at 2009 Regent Street Motor Show

The Steamobile was an American steam car manufactured in Keene, New Hampshire, from 1900 until 1902, first by the Trinity Cycle Manufacturing Company and its successor, the Steamobile Company of America.

== History ==
Reynold Janney factory superintendent of the Trinity Cycle Manufacturing Company developed a steam car that he marketed in the fall of 1900. The Keene Steamobile was powered by a two-cylinder double-acting 7/9-hp engine, with a water-tube boiler with 420 copper tubes and priced at $850, equivalent to $32,895 in 2025. Janney organized the Keene Automobile Company which was purchased in February 1901 by E. P. Wells and Winfield S. Rogers and the newly formed Steamobile Company of America. Reynold Janney departed and became superintendent of the Locomobile Works for two years. W. S. Rogers became the new factory superintendent and added a dos-a-dos model priced at $900.

In 1901 Steamobile displayed at the Pan-American Exposition, and added a new model called a Transit that had a tonneau body up front. Advertised as a railroad inspection car or package delivery it was available for $1,000, equivalent to $38,700 in 2025. F. Wilkinson & Co. of Manchester became the sole agent for Steamobile in Great Britain and displayed at the 1902 Royal Agricultural Hall Motor Show.

E. P. Wells and W. S. Rogers set-up a new company called the Roller Bearing and Equipment Company of America in the Steamobile factory. In June 1902 Standard Roller Bearing of Philadelphia purchased the Steamobile Company and the Roller Bearing company factory at Keene, which included 40 unsold Steamobiles.

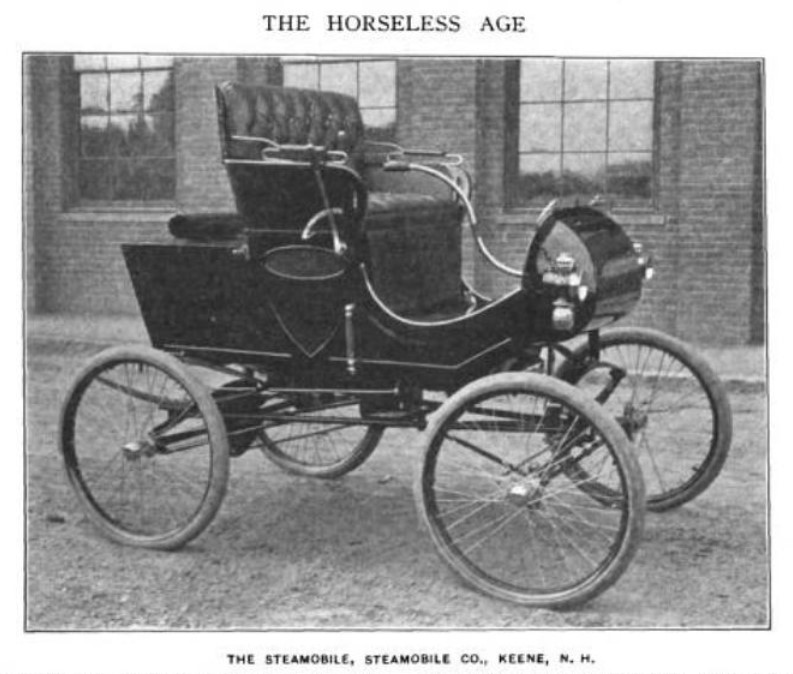
1901 Steamobile Stanhope in the Horseless Age

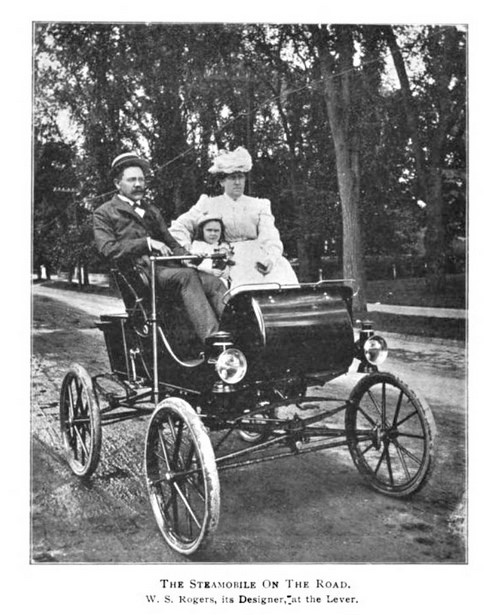
1902 Steamobile - W. S. Rogers driving from Automobile Topics

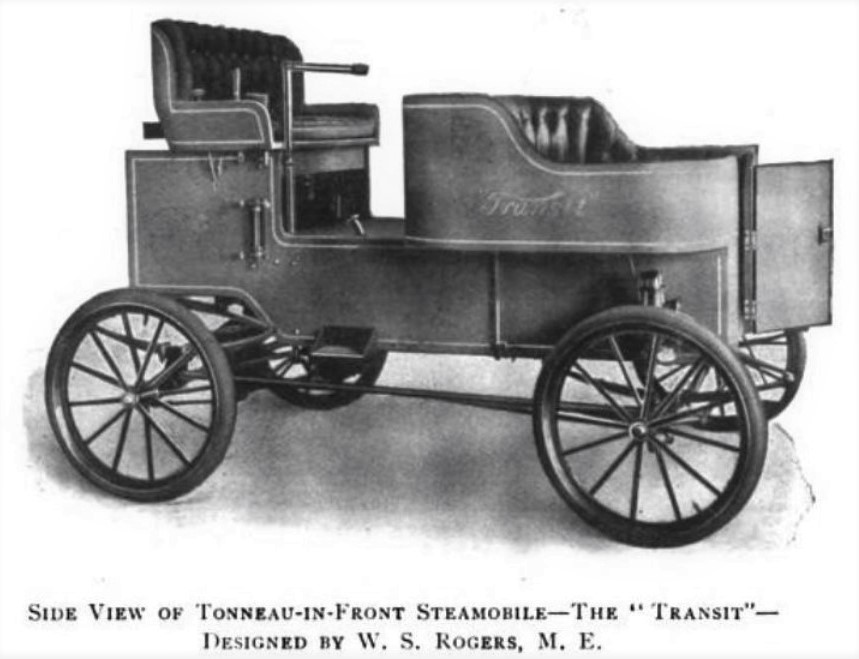
1901 Steamobile Transit with front tonneau from Automobile Topics

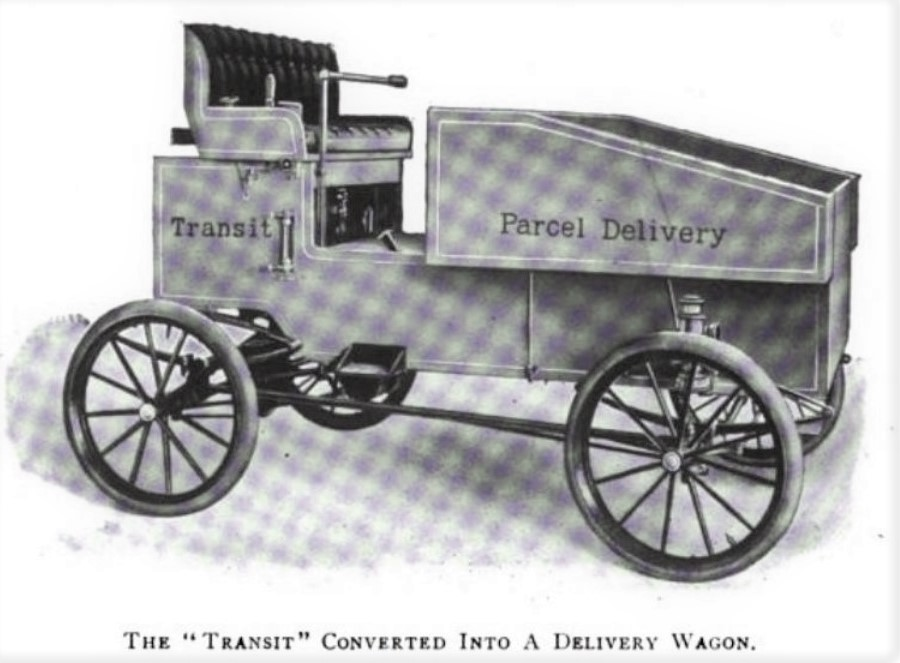
1901 Steamobile Transit configured for parcels from Automobile Topics
