= Metalab (disambiguation) =

Metalab is a hackerspace in Vienna's central first district.

Metalab may also refer to:

- MetaLab, Ltd., an interface design firm located in Victoria, British Columbia
- ibiblio, a digital library and archive project
