= Theodore Wilkinson =

Theodore Wilkinson may refer to:

- Theodore Stark Wilkinson (politician) (1847–1921), U.S. Representative from Louisiana
- Theodore Stark Wilkinson (1888–1946), United States Navy admiral and Medal of Honor recipient

== See also ==
- Wilkinson (surname)
