= Edward Wilkinson =

Edward Wilkinson may refer to:

- Edward Wilkinson (commissioner) (1733-1771), South Carolina commissioner and trade factor
- Edward Wilkinson (bishop) (1837–1914), English Anglican bishop
- Edward Wilkinson (naturalist) (1846–1918), American naturalist and museum curator
- Edward Wilkinson (cricketer) (1853–1881), English soldier and cricketer
- Edward Wilkinson (secret agent) (1902-1944), English secret agent
- Edward A. Wilkinson, United States Navy admiral
- Ed Wilkinson (1890–1918), Major League Baseball player
