= Andrew Wilkinson (disambiguation) =

Andrew Wilkinson may refer to:

- Andrew Wilkinson, Australian-born Canadian politician
- Andrew Wilkinson (British politician), British politician
- Andrew Wilkinson (paediatrician), British paediatrician
- Andrew Wood Wilkinson, British paediatric surgeon
- Andrew Wilkinson, Canadian founder of MetaLab, Ltd.
- Andrew M. Wilkinson, British education researcher and the originator of the concept of oracy
