= Jack Wilkinson =

Jack Wilkinson may refer to:

- Jack Wilkinson (footballer, born 1902) (1902–1979), English footballer with Sheffield Wednesday, Newcastle United, Lincoln City and other clubs
- Jack Wilkinson (footballer, born 1985), English footballer with Hartlepool United
- Jack Wilkinson (footballer, born 1931) (1931–1996), English footballer with Sheffield United, Port Vale and Exeter City
- Jack Wilkinson (Australian footballer) (1914–2000), Australian rules footballer
- Jack Wilkinson (rugby league) (1930–1992), English rugby league footballer who played in the 1940s, 1950s and 1960s, and coached in the 1960s
- Jack Wilkinson (Design Manager, born 1995) Design Manager and Rousseau Liaison at a leading Garage Equipment Company in the UK

== See also ==
- John Wilkinson (disambiguation)
