= David Ottley (cricketer) =

English cricketer

Personal information
- Full name: David George Ottley
- Born: 23 June 1944 (age 82); Worcester Park, Surrey, England
- Batting: Right-handed

Domestic team information
- Years: Team
- 1985: Minor Counties
- 1979: Minor Counties South
- 1976–1978: Minor Counties West
- 1975–1986: Hertfordshire
- 1967: Middlesex

Career statistics
Competition	First-class	List A
Matches	8	20
Runs scored	156	255
Batting average	17.33	15.00
100s/50s	–/–	–/1
Top score	47	54*
Balls bowled	12	5
Wickets	–	–
Bowling average	–	–
5 wickets in innings	–	–
10 wickets in match	–	–
Best bowling	–	–
Catches/stumpings	3/–	6/–
- Source: ESPNcricinfo, 1 October 2011

David George Ottley (born 23 June 1944) is a former English cricketer. Ottley was a right-handed batsman. He was born in Worcester Park, Surrey and educated at Tiffin School.

Ottley played for the Middlesex Second XI since 1963, he made his first-class debut for Middlesex against Lancashire in the County Championship. He made six further first-class appearances in that season, the last of which came against Surrey. His seven appearances were though without success, with him scoring a total of 109 runs at an average of 13.62, with a high score of 30. He left Middlesex at the end of the 1970 season.

He joined Hertfordshire in 1975, making his debut against Cambridgeshire in the Minor Counties Championship. He played Minor counties cricket for Hertfordshire from 1975 to 1986, making 79 Minor Counties Championship and eleven MCCA Knockout Trophy appearances. He made his first List A appearance for the county against Berkshire in the 1976 Gillette Cup. He made seven further List A appearances for Hertfordshire, the last of which came against Hampshire in the 1986 NatWest Trophy. In his eight appearances, he scored a total of 127 runs at an average of 18.14, with a high score of 54 not out. This score, which was his only List A fifty, came against Leicestershire in the 1977 Gillette Cup. During this period, he also played for a number of combined Minor Counties teams. It was for Minor Counties West that he made his List A debut for in the 1976 Benson & Hedges Cup against Gloucestershire. He made nine further List A appearances for that team, the last of which came against Lancashire in the 1978 Benson & Hedges Cup. In his ten appearances for the team, he scored 94 runs at an average of 10.44, with a high score of 34. He also made two List A appearances for Minor Counties South in the 1979 Benson & Hedges Cup. Eighteen years after his last first-class appearance, Ottley appeared for the Minor Counties against the touring Zimbabweans in 1986. In the Minor Counties first-innings, he made his highest first-class score, scoring 47 runs before being dismissed by Laurence de Grandhomme.
