= Christopher Chaplin (cricketer) =

English cricketer

Personal information
- Full name: Christopher Robert McNairn Chaplin
- Born: 13 December 1938; Calcutta, Bengal, British Raj
- Died: 27 February 2025 (aged 86)
- Batting: Right-handed
- Bowling: Right-arm off break

Domestic team information
- Years: Team
- 1966-1978: Cornwall

Career statistics
Competition	LA
Matches	3
Runs scored	45
Batting average	15.00
100s/50s	0/0
Top score	22
Balls bowled	30
Wickets	–
Bowling average	–
5 wickets in innings	–
10 wickets in match	–
Best bowling	–
Catches/stumpings	–/–
- Source: ESPNcricinfo, 19 October 2010

Christopher Robert McNairn Chaplin (13 December 1938 – 27 February 2025) was an English cricketer. Chaplin was a right-handed batsman who bowled right-arm off break. He was born in Calcutta, Bengal in the British Raj.

Chaplin made his Minor Counties Championship debut for Cornwall in 1966 against Devon. From 1966 to 1978, he represented the county in 73 Minor Counties Championship matches, the last of which came against the Somerset Second XI.

Chaplin also represented Cornwall in 3 List A matches. These against Glamorgan in the 1970 Gillette Cup, Oxfordshire in the 1975 Gillette Cup and Lancashire in the 1977 Gillette Cup. In his 3 List A matches, he scored 45 runs at a batting average of 15.00, with a high score of 22.

Chaplin died on 27 February 2025, at the age of 86.
