= John Rice (cricketer) =

English cricketer (born 1949)

Personal information
- Full name: John Michael Rice
- Born: 23 October 1949 (age 77); Chandler's Ford, Hampshire, England
- Batting: Right-handed
- Bowling: Right-arm medium

Domestic team information
- Years: Team
- 1983–1984: Wiltshire
- 1971–1982: Hampshire

Career statistics
Competition	FC	LA
Matches	168	180
Runs scored	5,091	2,397
Batting average	20.44	18.87
100s/50s	2/22	–/12
Top score	161*	91
Balls bowled	16,936	6,991
Wickets	230	189
Bowling average	33.50	24.92
5 wickets in innings	3	2
10 wickets in match	–	–
Best bowling	7/48	5/14
Catches/stumpings	153/–	74/–
- Source: Cricinfo, 19 October 2009

John Michael Rice (born 23 October 1949) is an English retired first-class cricketer who played for Hampshire from 1971 to 1982, and briefly from 1983 to 1984 for Wiltshire.

Educated at Brockley County Grammar School, Rice was a right-handed batsman and right-arm medium pace bowler. After appearing for Surrey's second team in 1970, Rice played 168 first-class games and 178 one-day matches for Hampshire, as well as 2 one-day matches for Wiltshire.

Rice had a career as an all-rounder, and was sometimes used as an opening batsman. He scored 5,091 runs and took 230 wickets in first-class matches and 2,397 runs and 189 wickets in one-day cricket. In 1975 Rice shared a stand of 61 for the tenth wicket with Andy Roberts in a one-day match against Gloucestershire, a Hampshire record for the tenth wicket which remains to this day.

Rice left Hampshire at the end of the 1982 County Championship season, and finally retired from the game in 1984 after a brief spell in Minor Counties cricket with Wiltshire. He was cricket coach at Eton College in 2010.
