= James Wilkinson (disambiguation) =

James Wilkinson (1757–1825) was an American general and politician.

James Wilkinson may also refer to:

- James H. Wilkinson (1919–1986), English mathematician and computer scientist
- J. Harvie Wilkinson III (James Harvie Wilkinson III, born 1944), American judge
- James Kemsey Wilkinson (1906–1997), British businessman, founder of Wilko
- James Wilkinson (Australian politician) (1854–1915), Australian federal politician
- Jamie Wilkinson, American internet culture researcher
- Jim Wilkinson (Australian politician) (born 1951), Tasmanian politician
- James Wilkinson (sailor) (born 1951), Irish sailor
- James John Garth Wilkinson (1812–1899), English homeopathic physician, social reformer, translator and writer on Swedenborg
- James M. Wilkinson (1838–1898), Michigan politician
- Jim Wilkinson (communications) (born 1970), former U.S. government employee who works in the field of public relations
- J. L. Wilkinson (1878–1964), American sports executive
- James Wilkinson, original owner of Wilkinson Sword Company

== See also ==
- James Wilkinson Breeks (1830–1872), Indian civil servant and author
