= Wilkinson Creek =

Wilkinson Creek may refer to:

== Streams ==
- Wilkinson Creek (Lake County, California), a tributary to St. Helena Creek
- Wilkinson Creek (Modoc County, California), a tributary to Pawley Creek
- Wilkinson Creek (Okaloosa County, Florida), a tributary to Pitts River
- Wilkinson Creek (Antrim County, Michigan), a tributary to the Torch River via Torch Lake
- Wilkinson Creek (Polk County, Missouri), a tributary to Ingalls Creek
- Wilkinson Creek (Chatham County, North Carolina), a tributary to the Haw River
- Wilkinson Creek (Lincoln County, North Carolina), a tributary to Wingate Creek
- Wilkinson Creek (Robeson County, North Carolina), a tributary to Shoe Heel Creek
- Wilkinson Creek (Benton County, Oregon), a tributary to Lobster Creek
- Wilkinson Creek (Lincoln County, Wyoming), a tributary to Hams Fork
