= Gary Wilkinson =

Gary Wilkinson may refer to:

- Gary Wilkinson (basketball) (born 1982), American basketball player
- Gary Wilkinson (rugby league), English rugby league coach
- Gary Wilkinson (snooker player), English snooker player
- Gary Wilkinson (comics), see Steve Roberts (comics)
- Gaz Wilkinson, or Gary Wilkinson, a British TV sitcom character

== See also ==
- Garry Wilkinson, presenter on World of Sport (Australian TV program)
