= Philip Wilkinson =

Philip Wilkinson may refer to:

- Philip Wilkinson (author) (born 1956), writer of non-fiction books
- Philip Wilkinson (banker) (1927–2007), British banker
- Philip Wilkinson (British Army officer) (born 1948), British police commissioner
- Philip Wilkinson (cricketer) (born 1951), English cricketer
- Philip Wilkinson (rower) (born 1947), Australian Olympic rower
