= Joseph Wilkinson =

Joseph Wilkinson may refer to:

- Joseph Biddle Wilkinson Jr.
- Joseph Wilkinson, member of Laura (band)

== See also ==
- Joe Wilkinson (disambiguation)
