= Wilkerson =

Wilkerson is a surname. Notable people with the surname include:

- Aaron Wilkerson (born 1989), American baseball player
- Brad Wilkerson (born 1977), American baseball player
- Brandie Wilkerson (born 1992), Canadian beach volleyball player
- Cathlyn Platt Wilkerson (born 1945), American radical and member of the Weather Underground
- Curtis Wilkerson (born 1961), American baseball player
- David Wilkerson (1931–2011), American evangelist
- David Wilkerson (politician) (born 1969), American politician
- Doug Wilkerson (1947–2021), American football player
- Eric Wilkerson (born 1966), American football player
- Evan Wilkerson, American Paralympic swimmer
- Gerald Eugene Wilkerson (born 1939), Auxiliary Bishop of the Roman Catholic Archdiocese of Los Angeles
- Herbert L. Wilkerson (1919-2021), U.S. Marine Corps Major general
- Isabel Wilkerson (born 1961), American journalist and Pulitzer Prize winner
- Isaiah Wilkerson (born 1990), American basketball player
- James Herbert Wilkerson (1869–1948), US federal judge
- Jerry Wilkerson (1943–2007), American painter
- Jimmy Wilkerson (1981–2024), American football player
- Joshua Wilkerson (1992–2010), American student murdered by an illegal immigrant in Texas
- Kristian Wilkerson (born 1997), American football player
- Lawrence Wilkerson (born 1945), U.S. Army officer, deputy to Colin Powell
- Lizzie Wilkerson (1895–1984), African-American folk artist
- Mark Wilkerson (born 1976), lead singer and guitarist of the rock band Course of Nature
- Muhammad Wilkerson (born 1989), US football Defensive End for the New York Jets of the National Football League
- Oscar Lawton Wilkerson (1926-2023), American pilot
- Ponchai Wilkerson (1971–2000), American murderer who was executed in Texas
- Robert King Wilkerson (born 1942), Black Panther Party member
- Stevie Wilkerson (born 1992), American baseball player
- Tichi Wilkerson Kassel (1926–2004), American film personality and the publisher of "The Hollywood Reporter"
- Tim Wilkerson (born 1960), NHRA drag racer
- Tyler Wilkerson (born 1988), American basketball player
- Wallace Wilkerson (c. 1834–1879), American murderer whose execution by firing squad in Utah was botched
- William R. Wilkerson (1890–1962), founder of "The Hollywood Reporter", Ciro's, and the Flamingo Hotel

Fictional characters:

- "Wilkerson", the family name in the television show Malcolm in the Middle
