= John Wilkinson (Scottish footballer) =

Scottish footballer

Personal information
- Full name: John Wilkinson
- Date of birth: 24 January 1886
- Place of birth: Glasgow, Scotland
- Date of death: 19 September 1918 (aged 32)
- Place of death: Dojran, Kingdom of Greece
- Position: Goalkeeper

Senior career*
Years	Team	Apps	(Gls)
1908–1912	Queen's Park	4	(0)
- * Club domestic league appearances and goals

John Wilkinson (24 January 1886 – 19 September 1918) was a Scottish amateur footballer who played in the Scottish League for Queen's Park as a goalkeeper.

== Personal life ==
Wilkinson worked as a coal salesman. After Britain's entry into the First World War in August 1914, he enlisted in the Argyll and Sutherland Highlanders and was sent with his battalion to Salonika in November 1915. Wilkinson was serving with the rank of lieutenant when he was killed during the Third Battle of Doiran on 19 September 1918, less than three months before the Armistice. He was buried in Doiran Military Cemetery.

== Career statistics ==
Appearances and goals by club, season and competition
Club	Season	League			Scottish Cup		Total	
Club	Season	Division	Apps	Goals	Apps	Goals	Apps	Goals
Queen's Park	1907–08	Scottish First Division	1	0	0	0	1	0
Queen's Park	1908–09	Scottish First Division	3	0	0	0	3	0
Career total			4	0	0	0	4	0
