= Blackwater River State Park =

State park in Florida, United States

- IUCN category III (natural monument or feature)
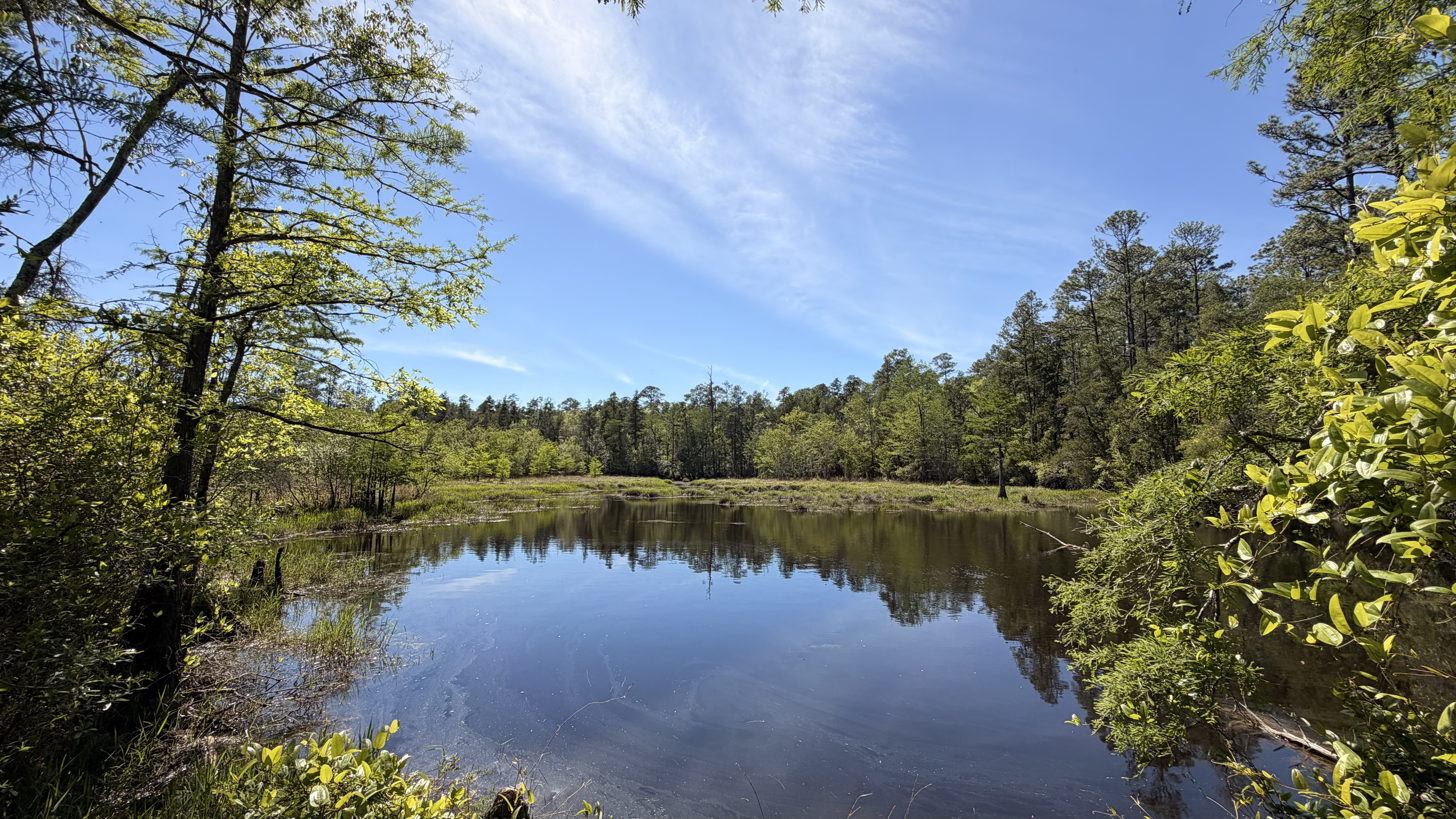
- Panoramic view of river in the park

- Location within Florida Location within the United States
- Interactive map of Blackwater River State Park
- Location: Santa Rosa County, Florida, USA
- Nearest city: Milton, Florida
- Coordinates: 30°42′25″N 86°52′41″W
- Area: 635.82 acres (257.31 ha)
- Established: 1967; 59 years ago
- Governing body: Florida Department of Environmental Protection

Blackwater River State Park is a Florida State Park located fifteen miles northeast of Milton, near Harold, off U.S. 90. The address is 7720 Deaton Bridge Road.

== History ==
The park opened to the public in 1968 with an area of 360 acres (150 ha).

The park was certified a Registered State Natural Feature in 1980, for possessing exceptional value in illustrating the natural history of Florida. In 1982, an Atlantic white cedar there was recognized as a Florida Champion tree, one of the largest and oldest of its species.

== Recreational activities ==
The park has such amenities as birding, boating, canoeing, fishing, hiking, kayaking, picnicking areas, swimming, tubing, wildlife viewing and full camping facilities. The main picnicking area has covered picnicking pavilions, restrooms, and a parking lot.

== See also ==
- Blackwater River State Forest
