= Trevor Wilkinson =

Trevor Wilkinson may refer to:

- Trevor Wilkinson (squash player) (born 1960), South African squash player
- Trevor Wilkinson (engineer) (1923–2008), British engineer and founder of sports car manufacturer TVR
