= Joe Wilkinson (disambiguation) =

Joe Wilkinson (born 1975) is a British comedian.

Joe Wilkinson may also refer to:

- Joe Wilkinson (footballer, born 1934) (1934–2007), English football goalkeeper
- Joe Wilkinson (footballer, born 1995), English footballer
- Joe Wilkinson (politician) (born 1946), member of the Georgia House of Representatives
- Joe Wilkinson, American member of the former band Dropbox

== See also ==
- Joseph Wilkinson (disambiguation)
- Jo Wilkinson (disambiguation)
