= John Wilkinson (Florida politician) =

American politician

John Wilkinson (September 2, 1848 – July 6, 1891) was a coachman, policeman, and politician in Florida. He represented Nassau County, Florida in the Florida House of Representatives in 1883 and 1885.

J. V. Drake wrote in 1883 that Wilkinson had been a slave owned by Mrs. Henrietta Harris who became the wife of Florida governor James E. Broome in 1853 and was later enslaved by judge J. C. McGee at Fort Clinch near Fernandina, Florida.

His post office was recorded aa being in Fernandina.

== See also ==
- African American officeholders from the end of the Civil War until before 1900
