= David Wilkinson (chemical engineer) =

Canadian chemical engineer & professor

David P. Wilkinson is a professor of chemical and electrochemical engineering at the University of British Columbia and a specialist in the field of electrochemical sciences and technologies.

In 2020, he was named a member of the Order of Canada, Canada's highest civilian honors, because of his contributions to electrochemical engineering and sciences, particularly the development of fuel cell technology.

== Awards ==
Wilkinson has received the R.A. McLachlan Memorial award, the R.S. Jane Memorial Award, the UBC Faculty of Applied Science Dean’s Medal of Distinction and the University of British Columbia Killam Research Award. He is also a fellow of the Engineering Institute of Canada, the Canadian Academy of Engineering, the Chemical Institute of Canada and the Royal Society of Canada.

== Career ==
Wilkinson joined the University of British Columbia Department of Chemical and Biological Engineering in 2004 as a Canada Research Chair in Clean Energy and Fuel Cells after working in various industry and government positions. Prior to his current work at UBC, he was Vice President of Research at Moli Energy, where he was part of the team that developed the world’s first commercial rechargeable lithium AA battery, and worked at Ballard Power Systems, where he assisted in fuel cell and hydrogen technology. Wilkinson was also a principal research officer and group leader at the National Research Council Institute for Fuel Cell Innovation, where he established a research and development group and laboratory in polymer electrolyte membrane fuel cell technology.
