= Charley Wilkinson =

American musician (born 1955)

Charles Earl "Charley" Wilkinson III (born October 4, 1955) is an American professional musician. He has been a member of the National Symphony Orchestra in Washington, D.C., since 1979, where he currently performs as the assistant principal timpanist, and is a key part of the percussion section. He earned his B.A. at the Cleveland Institute of Music in 1977 and his M.A. in 1978. He was also appointed associate adjunct professor of percussion at Kent State University in 1978, until his departure in 1979.

After his tenure at Kent State, Wilkinson joined the National Symphony Orchestra in 1979 as a percussionist and assistant principal timpanist. Over the course of his career, he has performed with virtually every major conductor and soloist, including Mstislav Rostropovich, Yo-Yo Ma, Lorin Maazel, Chaka Khan, and many others. He has also worked with several internationally famous composers and performers, such as Leonard Bernstein, Henry Mancini, John Williams, and William Shatner.

== Early life ==
Wilkinson was born on October 4, 1955, to Charles Earl Wilkinson II, a World War II veteran, and Mary Elizabeth Itsell. He and his sister Mary Ann, four years his senior, were born and raised in Howell, Michigan, then a very agricultural area outside of Brighton. Both he and his sister were brought up playing music, with both of them learning to play piano for a young age. Eventually, both excelled in percussion. Mary Ann attended and graduated from the Interlochen Center for the Arts in 1969. Charley followed her footsteps and graduated from the same school in 1973. Following his graduation from Interlochen, he enrolled in the Cleveland Institute of Music. He completed his Bachelor of Music degree in 1977 and his Master of Music degree in 1978.
