= Richard Wilkinson =

Richard Wilkinson may refer to:

- Richard Norton Wilkinson (died 1804), judge and political figure in Upper Canada
- Richard G. Wilkinson (born 1943), researcher in the field of public healthr
- Richard Denys Wilkinson, former British ambassador to Chile
- Richard Wilkinson (cricketer, born 1977), English former first-class cricketer
- Richard Wilkinson (cricketer, born 1982), English cricketer
- Richard H. Wilkinson (born 1951), American Egyptologist
- Richard James Wilkinson (1867–1941), colonial administrator, Malay scholar and historian
- Dick Wilkinson (1903–1976), Australian rules footballer
