= Walter Wilkinson =

Walter Wilkinson is the name of

- Walter Butler Wilkinson (1781–1807), political figure in Upper Canada
- Walter Wilkinson (puppeteer) (1888–1970), British puppeteer
- Walter Ernest Wilkinson (1903–2001), known as "Wilkie", British mechanic and founder member of the British Racing Mechanics Club
- Walter Wilkinson (actor) (1916–1981), American actor
- Walter Wilkinson (athlete) (born 1944), British middle-distance runner
