= John Wilkinson Jr. =

American state legislator

John Wilkinson Jr. was an American state legislator in Florida. He was photographed along with other legislators by Alvan S. Harper. His post office was recorded as being in Otahite.

He opposed the re-election of U.S. Senator Wilkinson Call.
