= Suzanne Jane Wilkinson =

New Zealand engineering academic

Suzanne Wilkinson
- Education: Oxford Brookes University
- Scientific career
- Fields: disaster management construction management engineering management build back better
- Workplaces: Auckland University of Technology
- Thesis: Entry to employment : choices made by qualified women civil engineers leaving higher education. (1993)

Suzanne Jane Wilkinson is a New Zealand engineering academic. She is professor in construction and disaster resilience and she is currently the dean of the faculty of Design and Creative Technologies at AUT.

== Academic career ==
She is currently a deputy dean and professor in the Faculty of Design and Creative Technologies at AUT. Suzanne was a full professor in the School of Built Environment at Massey University in Auckland. Wilkinson has a PhD in construction management, and a BEng (Hons) in civil engineering, both from Oxford Brookes University, UK. She also has a graduate diploma in business studies (dispute resolution) from Massey University. Her current research focuses on disaster management, construction innovation, resilience and smart cities. She is interested in how cities, communities and organisations, including construction organisations, plan for disasters and manage hazard events and how to make them more resilience. At the moment she is working on ideas on construction climate mitigation.

After a 1993 PhD titled Entry to Employment : Choices made by qualified women civil engineers leaving higher education at the Oxford Brookes University, she moved to the University of Auckland, rising to full professor in 2016 before moving to her new position as director of postgraduate studies in the School of Built Environment and associate dean (research) in the College of Sciences at Massey University.

== Selected works ==
Wilkinson has written and co-authored over 300 publications, 200 of them are peer reviewed journal articles. She is considered one of the world experts in disaster management, disaster recovery and post-disaster reconstruction.

- Chang, Yan, Suzanne Wilkinson, Regan Potangaroa, and Erica Seville. "Resourcing challenges for post-disaster housing reconstruction: a comparative analysis." Building Research & Information 38, no. 3 (2010): 247–264.
- Chang, Yan, Suzanne Wilkinson, Regan Potangaroa, and Erica Seville. "Donor-driven resource procurement for post-disaster reconstruction: Constraints and actions." Habitat International 35, no. 2 (2011): 199–205.
- Chang, Yan, Suzanne Wilkinson, Erica Seville, and Regan Potangaroa. "Resourcing for a resilient post-disaster reconstruction environment." International Journal of Disaster Resilience in the Built Environment 1, no. 1 (2010): 65–83.
- Seville, Erica, David Brunsdon, Andre Dantas, Jason Le Masurier, Suzanne Wilkinson, and John Vargo. "Organisational resilience: Researching the reality of New Zealand organisations." Journal of business continuity & emergency planning 2, no. 3 (2008): 258–266.

Books

- Wilkinson, S., Scofield, R, (2024), Management for the New Zealand Construction Industry 3rd edition, Edify Limited
- Mannakkara S., Wilkinson S., Potangaroa R., (2018) Resilient Post Disaster Recovery through Building Back Better, Routledge, 148 pages.
- Wilkinson, S., Scofield, R. (2010). Management for the New Zealand Construction Industry (2nd ed.). New Zealand: Pearson Education New Zealand, 306 pages.
- Brooker, P., Wilkinson, S. (2010). Mediation in the Construction Industry: an international review. UK: Routledge, Taylor and Francis, 224 pages.
- Wilkinson, S., Scofield, R, (2003). Management for the New Zealand Construction Industry, Prentice Hall, Auckland, New Zealand, 306 pages,
