= John F. N. Wilkinson =

American librarian (1832–1912)

- Born: c. 1832; Washington, DC
- Died: October 5, 1912 (aged 79–80); Washington, DC
- Occupations: Assistant Librarian, Library of Congress
- Years active: 1857-1912

John Francis Nicholas Wilkinson (c. 1832 – October 5, 1912) was a librarian at the Library of Congress. Wilkinson was an African-American who worked his way up from a custodial position to working as an assistant law librarian at the Law Library of Congress. He is noted as the Library of Congress's longest serving employee, with over 55 years of service.

== Early life and education ==
John F. N. Wilkinson was born in Washington, D.C. in about 1832. He was of mixed black, white, and Native American heritage; his family moved to D.C. from Virginia in 1831 in the aftermath of Nat Turner's Rebellion, when officials forced free black people from the state.

He had less than two years of formal school, from ages 9 to 11. As a teenager he worked as a bricklayer and as a steward on a mail steamboat.

== Library career ==
Wilkinson was hired by the Library of Congress in 1857 to perform custodial duties, including dusting books and maintenance of the law library room. When his laborer contract ended later that same year, he was hired as a messenger by Supreme Court Justice Roger B. Taney. Wilkinson's exhaustive knowledge of the collection led to his quickly moving up the ranks. Wilkinson served for fifteen years as the only assistant to Charles Henry Wharton Meehan, the first "Custodian of Law" (the role that would later be known as the Law Librarian of Congress). Because the law library had no catalog, legal researchers relied on Wilkinson's knowledge of the collection to help them find books. In 1892, when the law library's collection had reached 80,000 volumes, Law Librarian George F. Curtis asked Congress for funds for a catalog, observing that Wilkinson's "remarkable memory [...] for the multitudinous titles of the law books has in part made up for the lack of catalogues."

The only break in Wilkinson's career at the library occurred with Abraham Lincoln's appointment of John Gould Stephenson as the fifth Librarian of Congress in 1861. Stephenson dismissed Wilkinson, saying "it had been decided to employ no colored help". His knowledge of the library's collections were considered so essential that Chief Justice Taney and Senator Reverdy Johnson intervened to have him reinstated after two months.

In 1885, Wilkinson was featured in Frank Leslie's Illustrated Newspaper, described as "a remarkable librarian" who "carries this whole library in his head". The article noted Wilkinson's "perfect familiarity" with both law literature and legal cases, and his actions in pulling the required works from the shelves were characterized as having "the precision of a Swiss bell-ringer".

Wilkinson worked at the Library until the day of his death, October 5, 1912. Librarian of Congress Herbert Putnam spoke at his funeral; in Putnam's annual report of the Librarian of Congress, he described Wilkinson's "exact memory" of books and people, and commended his "prompt, simple, and respectful service". Putnam went on to say that Wilkinson "made so favorable an impression upon Members of Congress, the bar, and the Justices of the Supreme Court [...] that he was at one time even urged for the Law Librarianship itself".

As of 2016, Wilkinson's more than 55 years of service continues to make him the Library of Congress's longest serving employee.

== Community service and personal life ==
Wilkinson was an active participant in the Washington, D.C. African American community, including joining several fraternal organizations such as the Colored Masonic Lodge and attending Israel Colored Methodist Episcopal Church. He served as one of the few African American members of the District of Columbia School Board of Trustees. At his death, his obituary in the Washington Bee said he "belonged to that rare set of colored leaders in this city, who accomplished great things without notice and the blare of trumpets, things affecting the education needs of the race as well as their civil and political rights".

He was survived by his wife Jemima and four children.
