= Neil Wilkinson =

Neil Wilkinson may refer to:

- Neil Wilkinson (ice hockey) (born 1967), Canadian ice hockey player
- Neil Wilkinson (footballer) (1955–2016), English footballer
- Hamilton (musician), Neil Hamilton Wilkinson
