= William Wilkinson =

William, Willy, Bill, or Billy Wilkinson may refer to:

== Law and politics ==
- William Wilkinson (diplomat) (died 1836), British Consul to Wallachia and Moldavia
- William Arthur Wilkinson (1795–1865), British MP for Lambeth
- William Wilkinson (New South Wales politician) (1858–1946), Australian politician and doctor

== Sports ==
=== Cricket ===
- William Wilkinson (cricketer, born 1857) (1857–1946), Australian-born physician and cricketer
- William Wilkinson (cricketer, born 1859) (1859–1940), English cricketer
- William Wilkinson (cricketer, born 1881) (1881–1961), English cricketer and footballer
- William Wilkinson (Australian cricketer) (1899–1974), Australian cricketer

=== Other sports ===
- William Wilkinson (footballer) (fl. 1890s), English football goalkeeper
- Bill Wilkinson (ice hockey) (born 1947), Canadian college ice hockey coach
- Bill Wilkinson (baseball) (born 1964), American baseball player
- Bill Wilkinson (athlete) (born 1934), English distance runner
- Billy Wilkinson (born 1951), Scottish footballer

== Others ==
- William Wilkinson (architect) (1819–1901), British Gothic Revival architect
- William Cleaver Wilkinson (1833–1920), American Baptist minister and professor
- William Henry Wilkinson (trade unionist) (1850–1906), British trade union leader
- William Birkinshaw Wilkinson (1854–1927), Australian businessman, member of the Royal Geographical Society
- William Henry Wilkinson (1858–1930), British Sinologist
- William Alexander Wilkinson (1892–1983), Australian born British army officer
- William Wilkinson (priest) (born 1897), Welsh Anglican priest
- Bill Wilkinson (white supremacist) (born 1942), American social activist
- Willy Wilkinson, American public health consultant
