= Stuart Wilkinson (cricketer) =

English cricketer (born 1942)

Personal information
- Full name: John Stuart Wilkinson
- Born: 18 October 1942 (age 84); Ebchester, County Durham, England
- Batting: Right-handed
- Bowling: Right-arm fast-medium

Domestic team information
- Years: Team
- 1979: Minor Counties North
- 1977–1978: Minor Counties East
- 1969–1984: Durham

Career statistics
Competition	List A
Matches	23
Runs scored	39
Batting average	3.54
100s/50s	0/0
Top score	8
Balls bowled	1,376
Wickets	25
Bowling average	27.92
5 wickets in innings	1
10 wickets in match	0
Best bowling	5/24
Catches/stumpings	3/–
- Source: Cricinfo, 8 September 2011

John Stuart Wilkinson (born 18 October 1942) is a former English cricketer. Wilkinson was a right-handed batsman who bowled right-arm fast-medium, with his bowling being his primary role within a team. He was born in Ebchester, County Durham.

Wilkinson made his debut for Durham in the 1969 Minor Counties Championship against Cumberland. He played Minor counties cricket for Durham from 1969 to 1984, making 72 Minor Counties Championship appearances and four MCCA Knockout Trophy appearances. He made his List A debut for the county against Yorkshire in the 1973 Gillette Cup. He made eleven further List A appearances for Durham, the last of which came against Kent in the 1985 NatWest Trophy. In his twelve appearances in that format, he took 13 wickets at an average of 32.07, with best figures of 5/24. These figures, which were to be his only five-wicket haul in List A cricket, came against Northamptonshire in the 1977 Gillette Cup.

Wilkinson also played List A cricket for Minor Counties East, making his debut for the team in the 1977 Benson & Hedges Cup against Essex. He made six further appearances for the team, the last of which came against Leicestershire in the 1978 Benson & Hedges Cup. He took 9 wickets for Minor Counties East, which came at an average of 20.22, with best figures of 3/23. In the 1979 Benson & Hedges Cup, Wilkinson made four List A appearances for Minor Counties North, taking 3 wickets at an average of 33.00, with best figures of 1/15.
