= Charles Wilkinson (cricketer) =

English clergyman and cricketer

Personal information
- Full name: Charles Allix Wilkinson
- Born: 9 August 1813; Swaffham Prior, Cambridgeshire, England
- Died: 18 April 1889 (aged 75); Boxworth, Cambridgeshire, England
- Batting: Unknown
- Bowling: Unknown
- Relatives: Edward Wilkinson (nephew)

Domestic team information
- Years: Team
- 1833–1835: Cambridge University
- 1833: Norfolk

Career statistics
| Competition | First-class |
|---|---|
| Matches | 8 |
| Runs scored | 286 |
| Batting average | 20.42 |
| 100s/50s | –/2 |
| Top score | 86* |
| Balls bowled | ? |
| Wickets | 3 |
| Bowling average | ? |
| 5 wickets in innings | – |
| 10 wickets in match | – |
| Best bowling | 1/? |
| Catches/stumpings | 5/– |
- Source: Cricinfo, 25 January 2023

Charles Allix Wilkinson (9 August 1813 – 18 April 1889) was an English clergyman and a cricketer who played in eight first-class cricket matches for Cambridge University, Norfolk and the Gentlemen between 1833 and 1835. He was born at Swaffham Prior in Cambridgeshire and died at Boxworth, also in Cambridgeshire.

Wilkinson was educated at Eton College and at King's College, Cambridge. He played cricket for Eton as a middle-order batsman and a bowler and appeared in the 1832 Eton v Harrow match at Lord's, when he was captain of the Eton team. It is not known whether he was right- or left-handed in either batting or bowling. At Cambridge University, he appeared in six games over three seasons that have since been designated as first-class, and was successful as a batsman. Against the Cambridge Town Club in 1833, he played an innings of 58 which was the highest of the match; against the Marylebone Cricket Club (MCC) in 1835, he opened the innings and carried his bat for an unbeaten 86 out of a total of 170. He played in the 1834 Gentlemen v Players game, but made no impact. The University Match between the cricket clubs of Oxford and Cambridge Universities was not played in the seasons that Wilkinson was in the Cambridge side.

Wilkinson became a Fellow of King's College in 1836 and graduated from Cambridge University with a Bachelor of Arts degree in 1837, which converted to a Master of Arts in 1841. In 1841 also, he was ordained in the Church of England as a deacon, becoming a priest the following year. From 1843 to 1865, he was the domestic chaplain to Ernest Augustus, King of Hanover and to his successor, George V of Hanover, the kingship of Hanover having separated from that of the United Kingdom at the death of William IV in 1837, when Queen Victoria succeeded to the UK throne. Returning to England in 1865, he was vicar of Sixhills, Lincolnshire and rector of nearby South Willingham to 1879, and then rector of Boxworth and of Childerley in Cambridgeshire to his death in 1889. He wrote a book about his experiences at the court of Hanover.

Wilkinson's nephew, Edward Wilkinson, was also a first-class cricketer for Cambridge University.
