= John Wilkinson (Worcestershire cricketer) =

English cricketer

Personal information
- Full name: John William Wilkinson
- Born: 20 April 1892; Dudley, England
- Died: 3 August 1967 (aged 75); Edgbaston, Birmingham, England
- Batting: Right-handed

Domestic team information
- Years: Team
- 1927: Worcestershire

Career statistics
Competition	FC
Matches	1
Runs scored	4
Batting average	N/A
100s/50s	0/0
Top score	4*
Balls bowled	102
Wickets	1
Bowling average	45.00
5 wickets in innings	0
10 wickets in match	0
Best bowling	1-45
Catches/stumpings	0/0
- Source: , 3 August 2008

John William Wilkinson (20 April 1892–3 August 1967) was an English first-class cricketer who played in one match for Worcestershire against Lancashire at Dudley in 1927.
