= Peter Wilkinson =

Peter Wilkinson may refer to:

- Peter Wilkinson (diplomat) (1914–2000), British intelligence officer and diplomat
- Peter Wilkinson (politician) (1934–1987), New Zealand politician
- Peter Wilkinson (priest) (1940–2026), Canadian priest
- Peter Wilkinson (Royal Navy officer) (born 1956), British admiral
- Peter Wilkinson (bass guitarist) (born 1969), British musician
- Peter Wilkinson (drummer), British-Australian rock drummer
- Peter Wilkinson (athlete) (1933–2014), English marathon runner
- Pete Wilkinson (born 1959), English racing driver
