= John Wilkinson (Watford footballer) =

English footballer

Personal information
- Full name: John Wilkinson
- Place of birth: Durham, England
- Position: Outside left

Senior career*
Years	Team	Apps	(Gls)
- Consett Celtic
1921–1924	Watford	61	(7)
1925–1926	Hartlepools United	0	(0)
- * Club domestic league appearances and goals

John Wilkinson, alternatively known as Jack Wilkinson, was an English footballer from Durham. He played as an outside left in the Football League for Watford. He made his debut in Watford's first ever Third Division South match, a 0–0 draw with Swansea City on 27 August 1921. He was a first-team regular in the 1921–22 and 1922–23 seasons, but made only three non-consecutive appearances in the following campaign, and was released in May 1924. He joined Hartlepools United for the following season, but did not make a League appearance for them.
