= Edward Wilkinson (cricketer) =

British cricketer and soldier

Personal information
- Full name: Edward Obert Hindley Wilkinson
- Born: 16 October 1853; Stevenage, Hertfordshire, United Kingdom
- Died: 8 February 1881 (aged 27); Scheins Hoogte, Colony of Natal
- Batting: Right-handed
- Role: Occasional Wicket-keeper
- Relatives: Charles Wilkinson (uncle)

Domestic team information
- Years: Team
- 1873: Cambridge University

Career statistics
Competition	First-class
Matches	5
Runs scored	39
Batting average	5.37
100s/50s	–/–
Top score	22*
Catches/stumpings	2/2
- Source: Cricinfo, 25 January 2023

Edward Obert Hindley Wilkinson (16 October 1853 – 8 February 1881) was a British soldier and a cricketer who played in five first-class cricket matches for Cambridge University and the Gentlemen of the Marylebone Cricket Club between 1873 and 1875. He was born at Stevenage, Hertfordshire, and died by drowning in the Ingogo river in the retreat from the Battle of Schuinshoogte in the First Boer War in South Africa.

Wilkinson was educated at Eton College and at Trinity College, Cambridge, though he appears to have left Cambridge University without taking a degree. As a right-handed lower-order batsman and wicketkeeper, he played in the Eton v Harrow match in both 1871 and 1872, captaining the side in the second year. At Cambridge, he was given three matches for the University side, and was wicketkeeper in at least one of them, perhaps all three, but made little impression as a batsman. His only innings of any length was an unbeaten 22 for the Gentlemen of the MCC against Kent in 1873: he also played in the same 12-a-side fixture in 1875.

Wilkinson left Cambridge University in the summer of 1873 after only a year and was commissioned as a second lieutenant in the 60th King's Royal Rifle Corps, being promoted to lieutenant two years later. He was adjutant of the 3rd battalion from 1875 and fought at the Battle of Gingindlovu in the Anglo-Zulu War in South Africa in 1879. Less than two years later, he was back fighting in South Africa and died in the aftermath of the Battle of Schuinshoogte; the newspaper report of the battle indicated that he was attempting to cross the flooded river to bring aid to wounded men from his battalion when he drowned.

Wilkinson's uncle, Charles Wilkinson, was also a first-class cricketer for Cambridge University.
