= Arthur Francis (Glamorgan cricketer) =

Welsh cricketer

Personal information
- Full name: David Arthur Francis
- Born: 29 November 1953 (age 72); Clydach, Glamorgan, Wales
- Batting: Right-handed
- Bowling: Right-arm off break
- Role: Occasional wicket-keeper

Domestic team information
- Years: Team
- 1988–1992: Wales Minor Counties
- 1973–1984: Glamorgan

Career statistics
Competition	First-class	List A
Matches	138	100
Runs scored	4,938	1,275
Batting average	24.56	16.34
100s/50s	3/23	1/3
Top score	142*	101*
Balls bowled	30	–
Wickets	–	–
Bowling average	–	–
5 wickets in innings	–	–
10 wickets in match	–	–
Best bowling	–	–
Catches/stumpings	62/–	36/–
- Source: Cricinfo, 4 August 2012

David Arthur Francis (born 29 November 1953) is a former Welsh cricketer. Francis was a right-handed batsman who bowled right-arm off break. He was born at Clydach, Glamorgan. In the field he was able to throw the ball equally well with either arm.
