= John Wilkinson (ice hockey) =

Canadian ice hockey player

- Born: September 9, 1911; Ottawa, Ontario, Canada
- Died: January 19, 1970 (aged 58)
- Height: 5 ft 11 in (180 cm)
- Weight: 195 lb (88 kg; 13 st 13 lb)
- Position: Defence
- Shot: Left
- Played for: Boston Bruins
- Playing career: 1931–1944

John Hamilton Wilkinson (July 9, 1911 — January 19, 1970) was a Canadian professional ice hockey player who played nine games in the National Hockey League for the Boston Bruins during the 1943–44 season. The rest of his career, which lasted from 1931 to 1944, was mainly spent in senior leagues.

== Career statistics ==
=== Regular season and playoffs ===
			Regular season					Playoffs
Season	Team	League	GP	G	A	Pts	PIM	GP	G	A	Pts	PIM
1929–30	Ottawa Rideaus	OCJHL	12	2	0	2	21	2	0	0	0	4
1929–30	Ottawa Rideaus	M-Cup	—	—	—	—	—	6	2	0	2	18
1930–31	Ottawa Rideaus	OCJHL	16	3	3	6	28	2	0	0	0	4
1931–32	Ottawa New Edinburghs	OCHL	26	2	3	5	61	2	0	0	0	8
1932–33	Ottawa New Edinburghs	OCHL	20	4	2	6	33	3	0	0	0	4
1933–34	Ottawa New Edinburghs	OCHL	13	2	2	4	15	3	1	0	1	0
1933–34	Ottawa New Edinburghs	Al-Cup	—	—	—	—	—	7	2	1	3	20
1934–35	Ottawa Senators	OCHL	19	5	0	5	42	8	0	0	0	14
1935–36	Wembley Canadians	ENL	—	8	6	14	18	—	—	—	—	—
1936–37	Wembley Monarchs	ENL	40	17	9	26	60	—	—	—	—	—
1937–38	Ottawa Senators	QSHL	17	5	5	10	39	3	0	0	0	5
1938–39	Ottawa Senators	QSHL	21	6	7	13	56	6	0	0	0	10
1939–40	Ottawa Senators	QSHL	21	1	4	5	38	—	—	—	—	—
1940–41	Quebec Senators	QSHL	33	8	13	21	45	8	2	2	4	2
1940–41	Winnipeg Navy	WNDHL	3	1	1	2	10	—	—	—	—	—
1941–42	Montreal Pats	QSHL	21	2	2	4	18	—	—	—	—	—
1942–43	Hull Volants	OHA Sr	14	2	4	6	11	4	0	1	1	4
1943–44	Boston Bruins	NHL	9	0	0	0	6	—	—	—	—	—
1943–44	Ottawa Commandos	QSHL	7	1	1	2	6	3	0	0	0	0
QSHL totals			120	23	32	55	202	20	2	2	4	17
NHL totals			9	0	0	0	6	—	—	—	—	—
