= Chris Wilkinson (disambiguation) =

Chris or Christopher Wilkinson may refer to:

- Christopher Wilkinson (MP), member of parliament for Clitheroe, England, in 1689
- Christopher Wilkinson (swimmer) (born 1943), British swimmer
- Chris Wilkinson (architect) (1945–2021), British architect
- Christopher Wilkinson (born 1950), American screenwriter and producer
- Chris Wilkinson (born 1970), British tennis player
