= Simon Wilkinson =

British transmedia artist

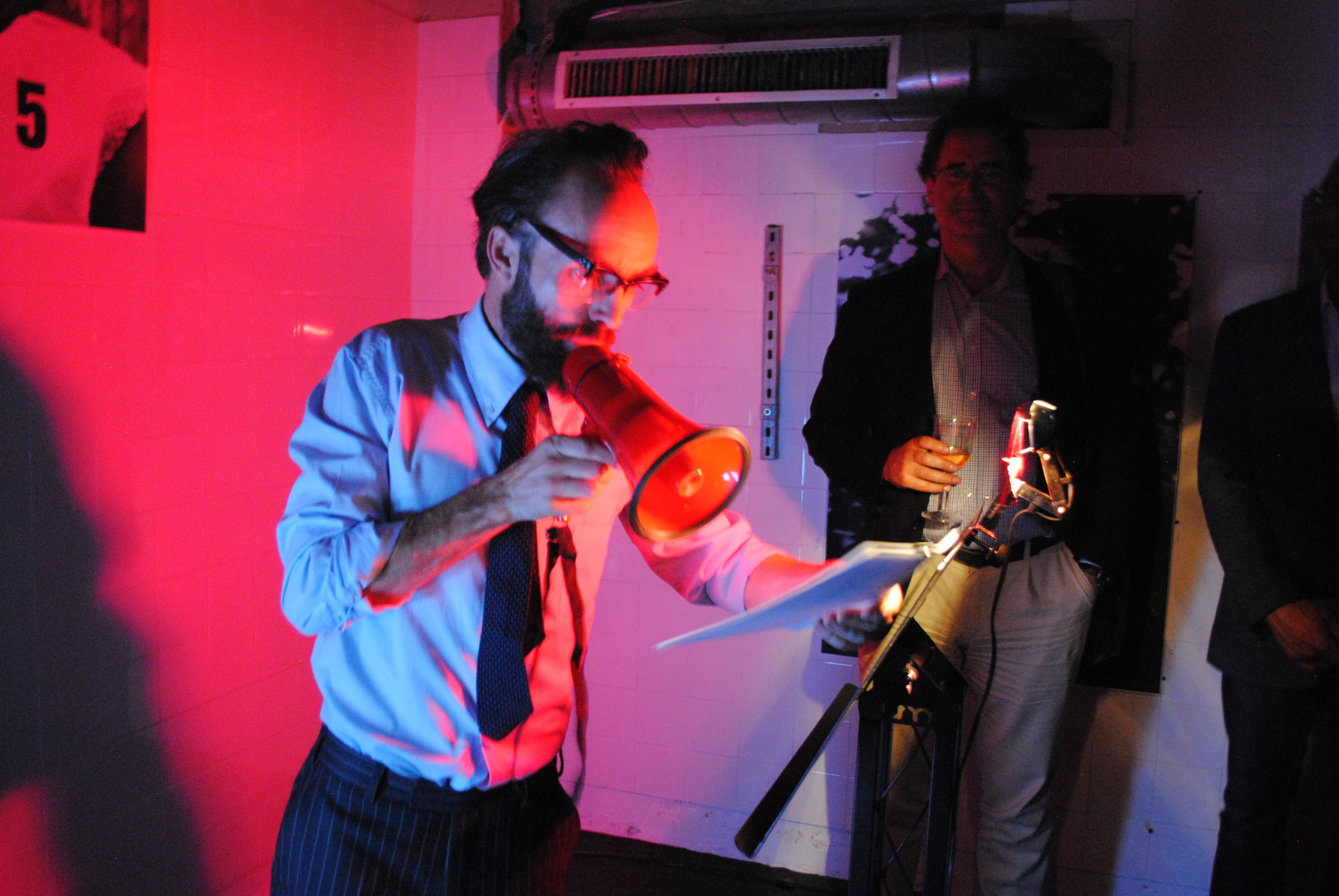
Simon Wilkinson performs The New Ten Commandments at The Old Market, Hove, in May 2014

Simon Wilkinson is a British transmedia artist. Wilkinson, who currently produces work as Circa 69, has featured in Tate Modern's Merge Festival (2011) and at many international festivals.

== Filmmaking and TV ==
Wilkinson began working as a filmmaker in 1993 when, with Paul Dutnall, he formed the Buck in Fudgy 'No/Low Budget Film and Video Collective' in Nottingham. Dutnall and Wilkinson held events in which they encouraged people to shoot film on the streets where they lived, using whatever equipment was available, screening the films in local venues. After holding similar events in London and Amsterdam, the pair moved to Brighton where, in 1997, they launched Junk TV, a youth and community film and screening company.

Junk TV went on to create 'expanded cinema' events, in which they combined film with live performances. The most ambitious was The Flophouse, a six-part film and theatre show, staged at Komedia, Brighton, from Autumn 2008 to Spring 2009.

Wilkinson has made many short films, including Sparkle, Horsey, The Sound of the Wind in the Trees, Gypsy, Where There is Love There is No Law, Death of an Innocent, and The Front. His films have won a Kino Short Film Award (2007); a Triangle Award (2007); a BBC Lottery Award for Best UK Arts Project (2008); a Koestler Award for Best Feature Film (2009); and Best Documentary at the Picture This Film Festival in Calgary, Canada (2009).

== Transmedia work ==
Wilkinson's work incorporates audiovisual, installation, virtual reality, electronic music, and online and performance media, often combining all of these forms simultaneously. Wilkinson describes transmedia as "the practice of telling a story through multiple platforms; so that, for example, instead of making a website "about" the theatre piece, the website becomes an embedded part of the narrative". He often uses transmedia platforms in order "to disrupt consensus reality and immerse audiences in experiences which blur the line between truth and fiction".

=== Il Pixel Rosso ===
In 2010, Wilkinson formed Il Pixel Rosso, a collaboration with Silvia Mercuriali, a theatremaker who creates autoteatro (theatre in which audience members perform the work, responding to instructions). In Il Pixel Rosso shows, audience members wear video goggles and follow headphone instructions.

==== And the Birds Fell from the Sky ====
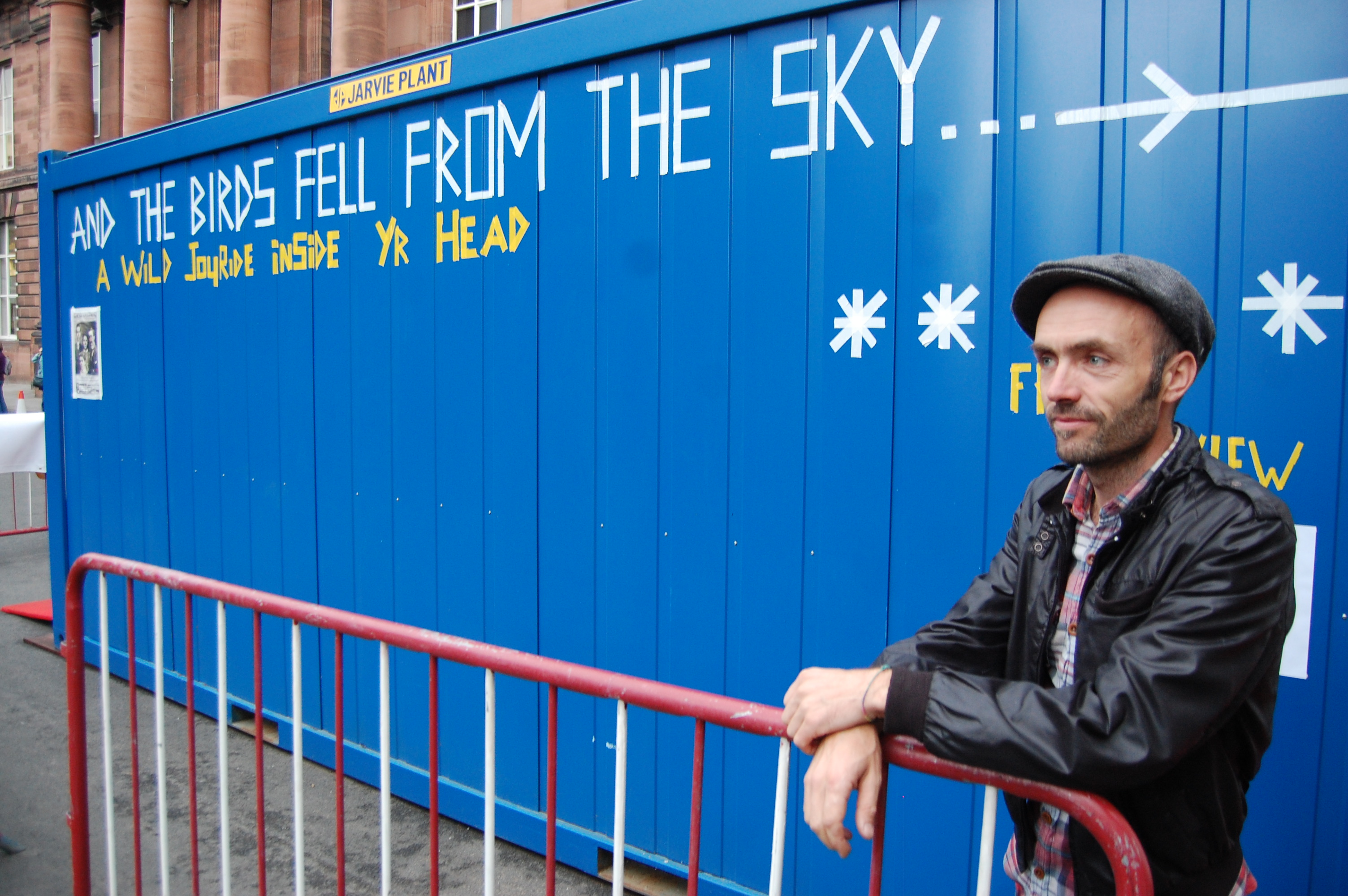
Wilkinson with And the Birds Fell from the Sky at the Edinburgh Festival in 2011

Il Pixel Rosso's first show was the 2011 And the Birds Fell from the Sky, which imagined an alternative world in which our own species lives alongside another type of human, 'an ancient tribe of feral clowns – the clowns upon which all other clowns are based – called the Faruk....The most significant achievement of humanity has been to take life, with all its wild propensities for adventure, and turn it into something tedious....The Faruk...did not adopt these developments, preferring the wild adventure of life lived for now to the stolid certainty of a life well planned. In this piece we, as audience, find ourselves in their world.'

Bella Todd described the experience in The Guardian: "It is a piece for an audience of two, who are given video goggles and headsets and seated in wheelchairs. Soon I was in a virtual car, joyriding through a dystopian landscape with a group of circus clowns. One of them opened a bottle in the front seat and I smelt and felt real-life vodka hit my face; later I was instructed to hold up my left hand, only to see a virtual hand on screen, hairy and stained with blood. My response to the autoteatro-style instructions was as immediate and unquestioning as that of a sleepwalker".

Transmedia aspects of the show included a live performance by a Faruk Clown rock band at the Nightingale Theatre, Brighton; a radio documentary, in which fake anthropologists discussed the Faruk and a fictitious policeman warned people to avoid the show; Faruk clown workshops, in which participants, dressed in dishevelled clothes, were encouraged to 'discover their own inner pariah'; and a fictional parish newsletter given to audience members before the show.

And the Birds Fell from the Sky has toured Europe and Australia, and now exists in English, Dutch, Portuguese, Italian, Japanese, and Welsh versions. It led to three new commissions:The Great Spavaldos, commissioned in 2012 by the Roundhouse as part of CircusFest; Rebels and Rubble, commissioned by Battersea Arts Centre to celebrate its 120th birthday in 2013; and Le Grand Voyage, for Harrogate Theatre as part of the 2014 Yorkshire Festival.

==== The Great Spavaldos ====
Il Pixel Rosso's second show is another immersive and multi-sensory theatrical experience, in which two audience members at a time each takes on the role of a circus acrobat.

The Great Spavaldos toured internationally, and currently exists in three languages, with the Dutch version co-produced with DeSpill, Belgium.

==== Rebels and Rubble ====
Rebels and Rubble is an immersive audio/video tour of BAC building, celebrating 120 years of radical activity there.

==== Le Grand Voyage ====
In their fourth work, Le Grand Voyage, four audience members, on stationary bikes, play the part of the Yorkshire team in a surreal version of the Tour de France. Pedalling their way towards the finishing line, the Team encounters disparate adversaries, including zombies, burlesque dancers, and dogs on bikes.

=== Circa 69 ===
==== The New Ten Commandments ====
In 2014, Wilkinson began to create work under the name Circa 69. The New Ten Commandments, a collaboration with the experimental theatre maker, Liyuwerk Sheway Mulugeta, was first performed in May 2014 at The Island (Bristol) and The Old Market (Brighton). Audience members were asked to take part in a ‘focus group’, led by Wilkinson and Mulugeta (his ‘intern’ from Lourdes), on behalf of the LDD – a mysterious market research group. The LDD have ‘tasked’ the group with ‘re-thinking, re-branding, and re-launching the Ten Commandments for the 21st century.'

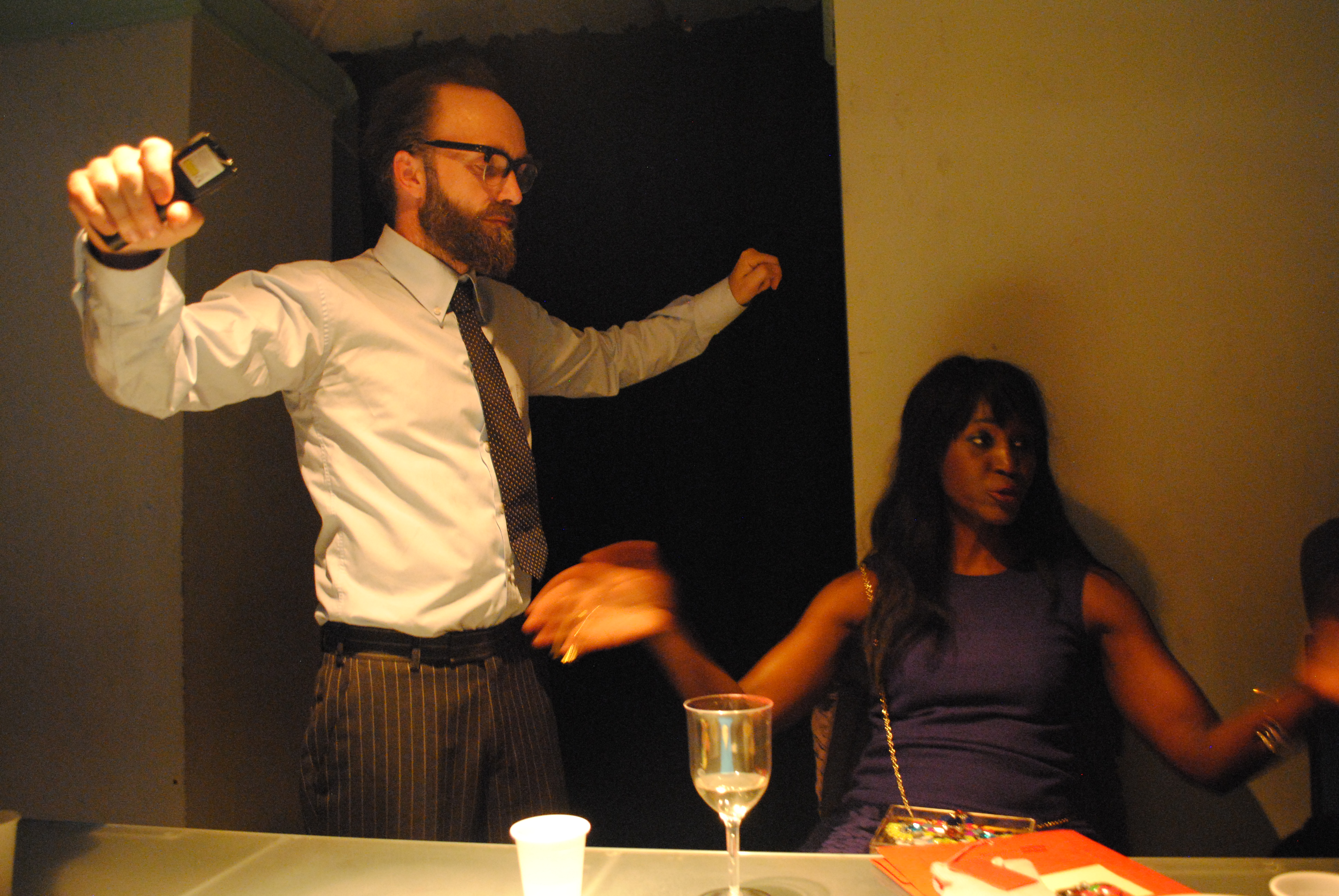
Wilkinson leads the New Ten Commandments focus group at The Old Market, Hove, on 9 May 2014

Writing in Total Theatre, Lisa Wolfe described the process: 'Sitting at a long table, with colour-coded folders and badges, Simon and Liyuwerk pitch questions to us about morality, society, environment, economics and love. We are asked individually and as a group to discuss these questions, some of which are intentionally provocative. Once the question has been chewed over, we each write a new commandment on a post-it note....Having written our new commandments, we then filed one by one into a ‘voting booth’ to pick our favourites.' Following each performance, the new list of commandments was posted on the show's website.

The transmedia aspects of The New Ten Commandments continued after the performance, as selected audience members were offered the chance to take part in an open world game involving telephone calls, Twitter conversations, and real world and online interactions, in an ever expanding narrative.

Richard Stamp, reviewing the piece in Fringeguru, described his own real world interaction: 'Before you leave, they'll slip you a business card – together with a conspiratorial hint that if you want to probe a little deeper, it might be worth calling the number written on the front. And it's then that The New Ten Commandments gave me something unexpected, something I genuinely treasured. I won't spoil the details, but they'll ask you to tell them about a moment of kindness someone else has shown to you. And in my case, that question triggered a real-world conversation – a word of thanks I owed a friend, and might never have summoned the courage to offer if it hadn't been for the thoughts planted by this show.'

There was a time when reality was reality and that was that, but the invention of public relations and Edward Burnays' idea of Engineered Consent changed reality on an industrial scale; from that time on everyday life became dominated by an artifice engineered to benefit those who spent the PR dollars; and, in effect, became a corrupting form of theatre.'

==== Beyond the Bright Black Edge of Nowhere ====
Circa 69's Beyond the Bright Black Edge of Nowhere was commissioned by Federation Square in Melbourne, Australia, where it was first performed in March 2014. It tells the story of a bizarre mass disappearance in 1950s America, told through cut-ups of 1950s B-movies, promotional films & commercials with a live electronic score, live classical instruments and eight monologues delivered by actors.

The background to the show is explained on the Brighton Digital Festival website: 'In 1982 when Simon Wilkinson was 12 years old, his mother bought him a copy of ‘Mysteries of the World’ magazine. Inside was a story from 1959 about how eight students from Magic Valley Liberal Arts College in Idaho had gone missing in very mysterious circumstances; and that all that was ever found of them were eight letters, written by the students to their parents, detailing a journey to what they described as ‘the bright black edge of nowhere’. Stranger still was the fact that the letters had been discovered inside a black wooden cube fifty miles into the Great Basin Desert.'

Jessica Cheetham reviewed the show on the Brighton Digital Festival website: "At the end the audience applauded and returned home, satisfied with the performance but with a curiosity – were the disappearances real?... Beyond The Bright Black Edge of Nowhere calls into question the information we receive, the power and authority that we take for granted, and our sources of reassurance in a digital age".

==== The Cube ====
Wilkinson returned to the story of the mass disappearance with Circa 69's next work, The Cube, a pioneering use of the new Oculus Rift gaming technology for storytelling. In the piece, a single audience member, wearing an Oculus Rift headset, plays the role of one of the missing students. Using Oculus Rift rather than video goggles allowed the participant, for the first time, to choose their own visual path.

In June 2015, Wilkinson took The Cube to Cambridge Junction's Watch Out Festival, where it was reviewed by Joy Martin in Exeunt magazine: 'The Cube by digital arts company Circa69 was one of the most surprising and exciting shows at Watch Out, and everyone was talking about it. It was a one-on-one performance with the artist, Simon Wilkinson, the director of Circa69, where I was fitted with the Oculus Rift, a virtual reality headset designed for 3-D gaming. Here it was turned to the purpose of engineering an artistic encounter in a new world, and it blew my mind, with its newness, the Dali-esque imagined American desert that appeared around me in a small room upstairs in the Junction, and a compelling story.'

Ben Noble reviewed The Cube in The Argus: "It is a fully immersive short film made into an irresistible game by the mystique of the shadowy and sinister history it tells. The blending of film, theatre, and solve-it-yourself thriller invites the audience to immerse themselves in the story even after the show. Part of the enjoyment is researching the story at home afterwards, only to find that this mystery forms an elegant mirror of the questioning of truth that virtual reality inevitably poses".

==== While the Rest Were Sleeping ====
On 2 October 2015, Wilkinson gave a talk at MUTEK in Montreal in which he announced a new project going into pre-production. Whilst The Rest Were Sleeping is a virtual reality performance created in collaboration with Jilt Van Moorst (Amsterdam Film Academy) and Hagbard Celine (Amoeba Design), with live music for 16 audience members at a time. Set in the year 2029, it will continue the story of Beyond the Bright Black Edge of Nowhere and The Cube.
