= David Wilkinson (scientist) =

Canadian material scientist and engineer

David S. Wilkinson is a Canadian material scientist and engineer, Distinguished University Professor at McMaster University. He was formerly Dean if Engineering (2008-2012) and then Provost and Vice-President of the university (2012-2017). In 1985–1986 Alexander von Humboldt Foundation Fellowship for research in Germany, held at the Max Planck Institute for Metals Research, Stuttgart. 1996, Elected Chair, Gordon Research Conference on Solid State Studies in Ceramics. 1996, Best Materials Paper, Canadian Metallurgical Quarterly 1999, Fellowship of the Canadian Institute of Mining, Metallurgy and Petroleum 2000 2000 Fellowship of the American Ceramic Society.
