= Wilkinson Lake =

Lake in the state of Minnesota, United States

- Location within Minnesota
- Location: Ramsey County, Minnesota
- Coordinates: 45°7′6″N 93°3′53″W
- Type: lake

Wilkinson Lake is a lake in Ramsey County, in the U.S. state of Minnesota.

Wilkinson Lake was named for Ross Wilkinson, a pioneer settler.

== See also ==
- List of lakes in Minnesota
