= John Wilkinson (footballer, born 1887) =

English footballer

Personal information
- Full name: John William Wilkinson
- Date of birth: 9 April 1887
- Place of birth: Darlington, England
- Date of death: 1955 (aged 67–68)
- Position: Centre half

Senior career*
| Years | Team | Apps | (Gls) |
| 1905–1906 | Darlington St Agnes | | |
| 1906–1911 | Manchester City | 31 | (2) |
| Total | | 31 | (2) |
- * Club domestic league appearances and goals

John William Wilkinson (9 April 1887–1955) was an English footballer who played in the Football League for Manchester City.
