= Jack Wilkinson (Australian footballer) =

Australian rules footballer, born 1914

Personal information
- Full name: Jack Wilkinson
- Born: 16 August 1914
- Died: 2 January 2000 (aged 85)
- Height: 189 cm (6 ft 2 in)
- Weight: 88 kg (194 lb)

Playing career^{1}
Years	Club	Games (Goals)
1935	St Kilda	1 (0)
- ^{1} Playing statistics correct to the end of 1935.

Jack Wilkinson (16 August 1914 – 2 January 2000) was an Australian rules footballer who played with St Kilda in the Victorian Football League (VFL).
