= Robert Wilkinson =

Robert Wilkinson may refer to:

- Robert Wylkynson (c. 1450–1515 or later), English composer
- Robert Wilkinson, an adult on the list of colonists at Roanoke Colony
- Robert Wilkinson (cartographer) (c. 1768–1825), English mapmaker
- Robert M. Wilkinson (1921–2010), American politician, Los Angeles councilman
- Robert Wilkinson (probate judge), probate judge, founding member of Phi Alpha Literary Society
- Robert Wilkinson (English cricketer) (1811–1888), English cricketer
- Robert Wilkinson (Australian cricketer), Australian cricketer
- Robert Wilkinson (Australian politician) (1838–1928), New South Wales politician and businessman
- Robert Wilkinson (footballer) (born 1956), Australian rules footballer
- Robert Wilkinson (Canadian politician) (1888–1967), Canadian politician in the Legislative Assembly of British Columbia
- Robert Shaw Wilkinson (1865–1932)), educator and president of South Carolina State University
- Robert Stark Wilkinson (1844–1934), British architect
- Bob Wilkinson (1927–2016), American football end
- Bob Wilkinson (cricketer) (1939–2020), English cricketer
- Monty Wilkinson (lawyer) (Robert Montague Wilkinson), acting U.S. attorney general in 2021
