= John Wilkinson (footballer, born 1949) =

English footballer

Personal information
- Full name: John Wilkinson
- Date of birth: 1 April 1949
- Place of birth: Worksop, England
- Date of death: 2007 (aged 57–58)
- Position: Full-back

Senior career*
Years	Team	Apps	(Gls)
1966–1968	Grimsby Town	9	(0)
1968–1969	Nantwich	4	(0)
- * Club domestic league appearances and goals

John Wilkinson (1 April 1949 – 2007) was an English professional footballer who played as a full-back.
