= John Wilkinson (Gloucestershire cricketer) =

English cricketer

John Wilkinson (1876–1948) was an English cricketer who played ten first-class matches for Gloucestershire. Eight of these came in the period between 1899 and 1902, but after a long gap he played two more games in 1920.
