= Steve Wilkinson =

Steve Wilkinson may refer to:

- Steve Wilkinson (footballer) (born 1968), English footballer
- Steve Wilkinson (cricketer) (born 1949), English cricketer
- Steve Wilkinson (tennis) (1941–2015), American tennis player and tennis coach
- Steve Wilkinson, member of the music trio, The Wilkinsons
