= Jo Wilkinson =

Jo Wilkinson may refer to:

- Jo Wilkinson (runner) in 2010 European Athletics Championships – Women's Marathon
- Jo Wilkinson (musician) who worked with Eligh and others
- Jo-anne Wilkinson, New Zealand youth worker

== See also ==
- Joe Wilkinson (disambiguation)
