= Wilkinson plc =

English chandelier manufacturer

- Type: Public
- Industry: Chandeliers
- Founded: 1922
- Founder: Frank Wilkinson
- Owner: David Wilkinson
- Website: https://wilkinson-ltd.com

Wilkinson plc are a firm of chandelier manufacturers and repairers based in Kent, England.

== History ==
The firm started as F. Wilkinson & Company in Stourbridge. From 1922 to 1927, Frank Wilkinson (1897–1927) was the first to commercialise the acid method of glass polishing to replace polishing of cut-glass by hand. In addition, his brother, Reginald Wilkinson (died 1986), developed the carborundum wheel method of cutting to replace the steel and sand method after he bought discarded worn carborundum wheels from a local bevelling firm. The new method reduced breakages and made more sophisticated shapes such as scalloped tops commercially viable.

The firm enjoys a royal warrant from Queen Elizabeth II.
