= MetaLab, Ltd. =

Interface design company based in Canada

Metalab
- Industry: User Interface Design
- Founded: 2006
- Founder: Andrew Wilkinson
- Headquarters: Victoria and Vancouver, British Columbia, Canada
- Key people: Luke Des Cotes (CEO)
- Number of employees: 150+
- Website: metalab.com

Metalab is an interface design firm headquartered in Victoria, British Columbia that operates internationally with teams across 19 countries globally. They work with startups and established organizations to provide product strategy, user experience design, software engineering and research services.

Metalab was founded in 2006 by Andrew Wilkinson. In January 2017, Metalab became a subsidiary of Tiny, a Canadian holding company that acquires and operates internet businesses. Following the acquisition, Metalab continued to operate independently while scaling its team and expanding its client base.

== Clients and Notable Work ==
Metalab has worked with a range of start-ups and fortune 500 companies, including Slack, Google, Uber, Coinbase, Headspace, and Amazon.

In 2025, Metalab led the rebrand of Cognition AI, an artificial intelligence–powered developer tools company, helping reposition the product with a more consumer-facing visual identity, and brand system, with the new name Windsurf. The rebrand was covered by Fast Company, which highlighted the project, as an example of how design can shape perception in emerging AI products.

== Services ==
Metalab provides product design and development services. Its core areas of work include:

- Product strategy and definition
- User experience and interface design
- Brand design and systems
- Software engineering and product development

The company primarily works with software-based businesses across sectors such as fintech, productivity, artificial intelligence, SAAS, health and wellness and consumer technology.

== Awards ==
In 2024 Metalab was named a finalist for Fast Company's Design Company of The Year, also winning a Fast Company Most Innovative Companies Award in 2016.

== Metalab Ventures ==
Metalab Ventures is the corporate venture arm of Metalab. The group was launched in 2024 with an initial fund of approximately USD 15 million to invest in product-led technology startups where strategy, design, and technology are key differentiators.

Metalab Ventures focuses on early-stage investments across the pre-seed, seed, and Series A stages and plans to back between 25 and 35 companies through its first fund. Its investment approach combines capital with access to Metalab’s internal design, engineering, and product expertise. The venture arm seeks founders who prioritize design as a fundamental way to connect with users. The general partners of Metalab Ventures are Luke Des Cotes and David Tapp.

== Products ==
Metalab has produced the following products:

- Ballpark, an online application that allows users to send invoices, receive payments, and bid on projects.
- Flow, a task management platform to create, organize, discuss, and accomplish tasks. In March 2011, Metalab announced the launch of Flow for the web, iPhone and iPad.
- Pixel Union, a collaboration between Metalab and 45royale that creates curated internet themes for web pages and web platforms.

== Mozilla ==
In March 2010, Andrew Wilkinson (co-founder of Metalab) wrote a blog post claiming that Mozilla 'literally copied images straight off our site' for use in the design of their FlightDeck editor. In an updated blog post, Wilkinson stated that, "I just got off the phone with the team at Mozilla, who apologized and clarified a few things. The design which used our site’s design elements was a development build and according to them the design has been changed in newer builds. That said, it was used in their launch video as well as their blog post announcing the product. They told me that that the team who put together the blog post and video was unaware of the similarities at the time of inclusion. We’ve asked for a public apology, and I’ll be doing a follow-up post tomorrow."
