= John Woodford (English cricketer) =

English cricketer (born 1943)

John Douglas Woodford (born 9 September 1943, in Little Horton, England) is an English first-class cricketer who played for the Yorkshire County Cricket Club from 1968 to 1973, and appeared for Northumberland in the Minor Counties Cricket Championship.

Woodford is a right-handed batsman, who scored 1,204 first-class runs in thirty-eight matches with a highest score of 101, his only century. In seventy-four List A one day games, he compiled 951 runs at an average of 21.61, with a best score of 69 not out. Although he only took four first-class wickets, he was more successful in the limited over format, snaring 79 victims with his medium pacers at 21.01.
