= David Toseland =

English cricketer

Personal information
- Full name: David Anthony Toseland
- Born: 22 December 1952 (age 73); Redruth, Cornwall, England
- Batting: Right-handed
- Bowling: Right-arm off break

Domestic team information
- Years: Team
- 1973-1994 & 2000: Cornwall

Career statistics
Competition	LA
Matches	5
Runs scored	46
Batting average	23.00
100s/50s	–/–
Top score	39
Balls bowled	348
Wickets	7
Bowling average	25.85
5 wickets in innings	–
10 wickets in match	–
Best bowling	3/27
Catches/stumpings	–/–
- Source: Cricinfo, 17 October 2010

David Anthony Toseland (born 22 December 1952) is a former English cricketer. Toseland was a right-handed batsman who bowled right-arm off break. He was born at Redruth, Cornwall.

Toseland made his Minor Counties Championship debut for Cornwall in 1973 against Devon. From 1973 to 1994, he represented the county in 127 Minor Counties Championship matches, the last of which came against Wiltshire. Toseland also represented Cornwall in the MCCA Knockout Trophy. His debut in that competition came against Devon in 1984. From 1984 to 1994, he represented the county in 13 Trophy matches, the last of which came against Devon.

Toseland also represented Cornwall in List A cricket. His first List A match came against Oxfordshire in the 1975 Gillette Cup. From 1975 to 2000, he represented the county in 5 List A matches, the last of which came against Norfolk in the 2000 NatWest Trophy, coming some six years after his previous appearance for the county. In his 5 List A matches, he scored 46 runs at a batting average of 23.00, with a high score of 39. With the ball he took 7 wickets at a bowling average of 25.85, with best figures of 3/27.
