= Freddy Wilkinson =

English footballer

Personal information
- Full name: Frederick Wilkinson
- Date of birth: 1878
- Place of birth: Bishop Auckland, England
- Height: 5 ft 10 in (1.78 m)
- Position: Inside forward

Senior career*
Years	Team	Apps	(Gls)
1902–1903	Bishop Auckland		
1903–1905	Grimsby Town	16	(2)
1905–1907	Norwich City		
1907–1908	Shildon Athletic		
1908–1909	Barnsley	15	(0)
1909–1910	Shildon Athletic		
1910–191?	Darlington		
- * Club domestic league appearances and goals

Frederick Wilkinson (born 1878) was an English professional footballer who played as an inside forward.
