= Gwyn Richards (cricketer) =

Welsh cricketer (1951–2023)

Personal information
- Born: 29 November 1951; Maesteg, Glamorgan, Wales
- Died: 14 October 2023 (aged 71); Maesteg, Glamorgan, Wales
- Batting: Right-handed
- Bowling: Right-arm off break

Domestic team information
- Years: Team
- 1971–1979: Glamorgan

Career statistics
Competition	First-class	List A
Matches	107	96
Runs scored	3,370	1,058
Batting average	22.77	16.03
100s/50s	1/15	–/2
Top score	102*	73
Balls bowled	4,149	1,724
Wickets	48	45
Bowling average	47.02	26.95
5 wickets in innings	1	1
10 wickets in match	–	–
Best bowling	5/55	5/29
Catches/stumpings	36/–	25/–
- Source: Cricinfo, 28 October 2012

Gwyn Richards (29 November 1951 – 14 October 2023) was a Welsh cricketer. Richards was a right-handed batsman who bowled right-arm off break. He was born at Maesteg, Glamorgan. He owned a sport shop in Maesteg. Richards died on 14 October 2023, at the age of 71.
