= Blackwater River State Forest =

Protected area in Florida, United States

- Location within Florida
- Interactive map of Blackwater River State Forest
- Location: Santa Rosa and Okaloosa counties, Florida, United States
- Nearest city: Milton
- Coordinates: 30°43′58.44″N 86°52′29.1″W
- Area: 206,900 acres (83,700 ha)
- Other information: Hiking, biking, horseback riding, hunting, fishing, camping, boating

Blackwater River State Forest is a state forest in the western panhandle of Florida, United States. It is administered by the Florida Forest Service, part of the Florida Department of Agriculture and Consumer Services. Blackwater River State Forest is completely contained within Santa Rosa and Okaloosa Counties. The forest is managed from a common headquarters in Munson, Florida. There are local ranger offices in Molino (Escambia County), Milton, (Santa Rosa County), and Baker (Okaloosa County).

== Name ==
The forest shares its name with the Blackwater River, which rises in southern Alabama and flows south dividing Okaloosa and Santa Rosa before emptying into the Blackwater Bay.

== History ==
Otahite was one of the settlements that preceded the forest. It is now a ghost town but its post office was relocated and is part of a museum. State legislator John Wilkinson Jr. was documented as being from Otahite. Otahite means damp place. It was described in a newspaper 1934 publication as a hamlet near the western boundary of Okaloosa County.

Federal Forest and Department of Defense land was originally donated to the state of Florida in the 1950s to manage for timber and recreation. These tracts of land comprised close to 50,000 acres of primarily longleaf, slash, and loblolly pine plantations with scattered scrub resulting from years of mismanagement. Over time multiple acquisitions have been made to extend the size of the forests. Most of the additions have been from purchasing private timber company land while others have come from smaller private land owners.

== Recreation ==
The forest offers many recreational opportunities. Multiple camping areas, both developed and primitive are located throughout the forest. There are seven developed campgrounds areas, one day use lake area, and one off-highway vehicle park, Krul Lake Recreation Area, Bear Lake Recreation Area, North and South Hurricane Lake Recreation Areas, North and South Karick Lake Recreation Areas, Coldwater Recreation Area, Bone Creek Recreation Area, and Clear Creek OHV Park. Krul Campground has two camp ground loops and a day use area. Krul Lake is the only lake owned and managed by the forest service. Bear Lake Campground has a large campground loop with water and power and a second campground with only water for tent campers. There is also a pavilion available for use at Bear Lake. There are two trails around Bear Lake, a four mile loop for walking and hiking, and a six mile loop for bicycles. To the north is Hurricane Lake with a campground on the north and south shores. The south campground does not have electricity at its campsites. Further east into Okaloosa County is Karick Lake, it also has two campgrounds, one on its north shore and one on its south shoreline. In Okaloosa County off highway 90 east of Holt is Bone Creek Recreation Area. Bone Creek does not have any camping facilities but does have a day use area with access to an open pavilion and vault style toilets. All lakes, excluding Krul lake, are open for fishing and are managed and stocked by the Florida Fish and Wildlife Conservation Commission.

== See also ==
- Blackwater River State Park
- Conecuh National Forest
