= Alan Hodgson =

English cricketer

Personal information
- Full name: Alan Hodgson
- Born: 27 October 1951; Moorside, England
- Died: 6 October 2016 (aged 64)
- Batting: Left-handed
- Bowling: Right-arm fast-medium
- Role: Bowler

Domestic team information
- Years: Team
- 1970–1979: Northamptonshire

Career statistics
Competition	First-class	List A
Matches	99	127
Runs scored	909	408
Batting average	9.67	7.15
100s/50s	0/0	0/0
Top score	41*	26
Balls bowled	5,964	4,153
Wickets	206	169
Bowling average	28.95	24.57
5 wickets in innings	2	2
10 wickets in match	0	0
Best bowling	5/30	7/39
Catches/stumpings	31/–	20/–
- Source: CricketArchive, 13 June 2010

Alan Hodgson (27 October 1951 – 6 October 2016) was an English cricketer. He was a left-handed batsman and a right-arm fast-medium bowler who used to play for Northamptonshire.

Hodgson made his debut in 1970, and was part of the Northamptonshire team that won the 1976 Gillette Cup. In the same year, he won a county cap. He retired in 1979, but continued to play for the Old Northamptonians. In his autobiography, David Gower described Hodgson as a "big tall Geordie". He died suddenly on 6 October 2016. Speaking after the announcement of his death, Allan Lamb said of Hodgson that "He was a great man. When I first came to Northampton he was the guy that looked after me, helped me and settled me in."
