= Mike Llewellyn =

Welsh cricketer

Personal information
- Full name: Michael John Llewellyn
- Born: 27 November 1953 (age 72); Clydach, Glamorgan, Wales
- Batting: Left-handed
- Bowling: Right-arm off break

Domestic team information
- Years: Team
- 1983: Wiltshire
- 1970–1982: Glamorgan

Career statistics
Competition	First-class	List A
Matches	136	143
Runs scored	4,288	2,527
Batting average	23.17	22.97
100s/50s	3/20	–/10
Top score	129*	79*
Balls bowled	1,363	–
Wickets	23	–
Bowling average	26.73	–
5 wickets in innings	–	–
10 wickets in match	–	–
Best bowling	4/35	–
Catches/stumpings	87/–	41/–
- Source: Cricinfo, 28 October 2012

Michael John Llewellyn (born 27 November 1953) is a former Welsh cricketer. Llewellyn was a left-handed batsman who bowled right-arm off break. He was born at Clydach, Glamorgan.
