= Wilko (disambiguation) =

Wilko is a British variety retailer.

Wilko may also refer to:

- Wilko (horse), an American racehorse
- Wilco (given name), and Wilko, a Dutch masculine given name, including a list of people with the name

== See also ==
- Wilco (disambiguation)
- Wilkos, a surname
- Jonny Wilkinson (born 1979), English rugby player
- The Maids of Wilko, a 1979 film by Polish director Andrzej Wajda
