= Optical glass =

Special glass type used for optical systems

Optical glass refers to a quality of glass suitable for the manufacture of optical systems such as optical lenses, prisms or mirrors. Unlike window glass or crystal, whose formula is adapted to the desired aesthetic effect, optical glass contains additives designed to modify certain optical or mechanical properties of the glass: refractive index, dispersion, transmittance, thermal expansion and other parameters. Lenses produced for optical applications use a wide variety of materials, from silica and conventional borosilicates to elements such as germanium and fluorite, some of which are essential for glass transparency in areas other than the visible spectrum.

Various elements can be used to form glass, including silicon, boron, phosphorus, germanium and arsenic, mostly in oxide form, but also in the form of selenides, sulfides, fluorides and more. These materials give glass its characteristic non-crystalline structure. The addition of materials such as alkali metals, alkaline-earth metals or rare earths can change the physico-chemical properties of the whole to give the glass the qualities suited to its function. Some optical glasses use up to twenty different chemical components to obtain the desired optical properties.

In addition to optical and mechanical parameters, optical glasses are characterized by their purity and quality, which are essential for their use in precision instruments. Defects are quantified and classified according to international standards: bubbles, inclusions, scratches, index defects, coloring, etc.

== History ==
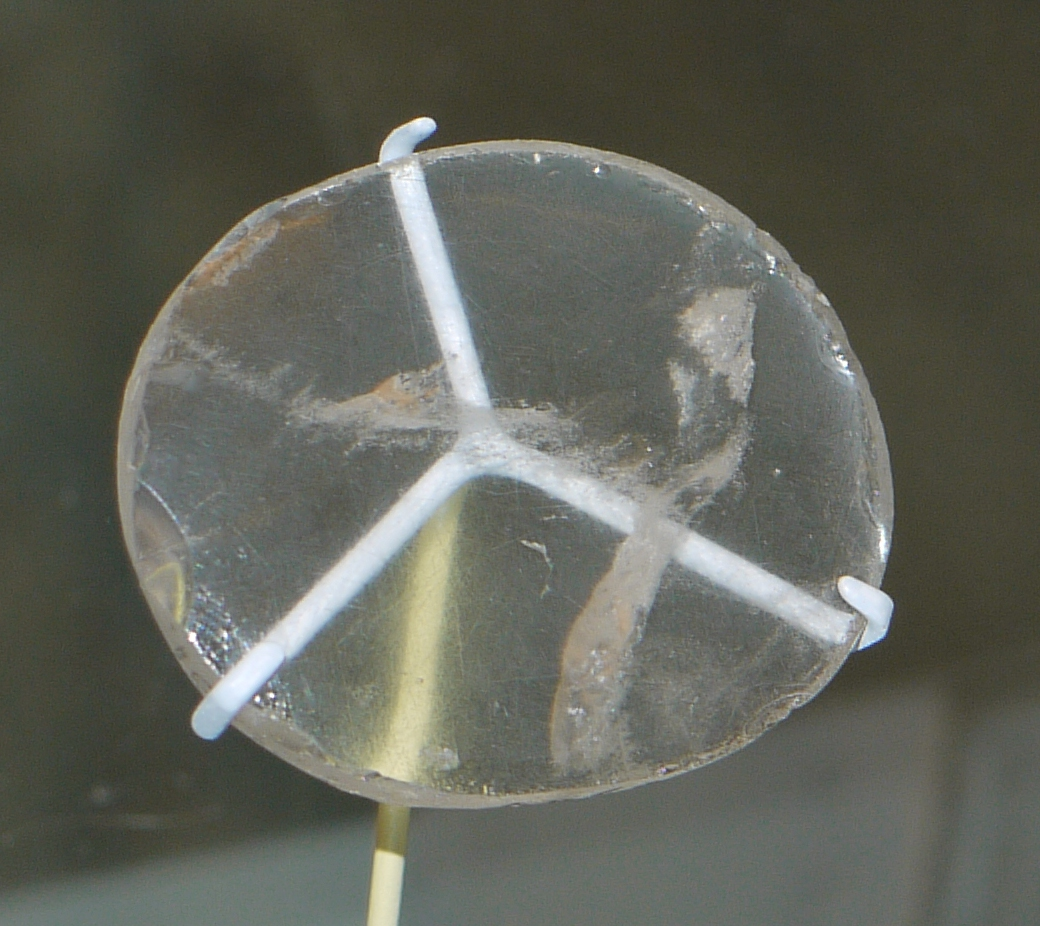
Quartz lens (diameter 38 mm) from Nimrud, Assyria, circa 750 BC (British Museum)

The earliest known optical lenses, dating from before 700 BC, were produced under the Assyrian Empire: they were made of polished crystals, usually quartz, rather than glass.

It wasn't until the rise of the Greeks and Romans that glass was used as an optical material. They used it in the form of spheres filled with water to make lenses for lighting fires (burning glass), as described by Aristophanes and Pliny, or to make very small, indistinct characters larger and sharper (magnifying glass), according to Seneca.

Although the exact date of their invention is not known, glasses are said to have been described in 1299 by Sandro di Popozo in his Treatise on Family Conduct: "I am so altered by age, that without these lenses called spectacles, I would no longer be able to read or write. They have recently been invented for the benefit of poor old people whose eyesight has become bad". At the time, however, "glasses" were actually made from beryl or quartz.

The only lens available at the time, ordinary soda-lime glass, was unable to compensate for optical aberrations. However, it evolved slowly over the centuries. It was first lightened by the use of ashes, which contain manganese dioxide that transforms ferrous oxide (FeO) into ferric oxide (Fe_{2}O_{3}), which is much less colorful. Then, around 1450, Angelo Barovier invented "crystalline glass" (vetro cristallino) or "Venetian glass" (cristallo di Venezia), improving on the previous process by purifying the ashes by leaching to obtain a purer potash. Lime was introduced, first for economic reasons in the 14th century, then as a technical improvement in Bohemia in the 17th century (Bohemian glass), eliminating a very large proportion of impurities. This practice did not arrive in France until the middle of the eighteenth century. It was at this time that the Manufacture Royale de Glaces de Miroirs (Compagnie de Saint-Gobain S.A.) began to produce glass composed of 74% silica, 17.5% soda and potash, and 8.5% lime.

Thus, the first complex optical instruments, such as Galileo's telescope (1609), used ordinary soda-lime glass (the first crown glass), composed of sand, soda, potash and sometimes lime, which, although suitable for glazing or bottles, was hardly suitable for optical applications (distortion, blurred effect, irregularities, etc.). In 1674, the British inventor George Ravenscroft, wishing to rival Venetian and Bohemian crystal while being less dependent on imported raw materials, replaced lime with lead(II) oxide to compensate for glass's lack of resistance to humidity, thus inventing lead crystal (the first flint glass, named after the high-purity English siliceous stone used), brighter than ordinary glass, composed of silica, lead oxide and potash.

Schematic diagram of an achromatic doublet

Chester Moore Hall (1703–1771), using the two types of glass available (soda-lime crown and lead flint), invented the first achromatic doublet. His work was taken up by John Dollond in his Account of some experiments concerning the different refrangibility of light, published in 1758.

The real revolution in optical glass came with the development of industrial chemistry, which facilitated the composition of glass, allowing properties such as refractive index and dispersion coefficient to be varied. Between 1880 and 1886, the German chemist Otto Schott, in collaboration with Ernst Abbe, invented new glasses containing oxides such as "anhydrous baryte" (barium oxide BaO) and anhydrous boric acid (B_{2}O_{3}), with which he developed barium crowns, barium flints and borosilicate crowns.

Between 1934 and 1956, other oxides were used. Then, by adding phosphates and fluorides, phosphate crowns and fluorine crowns were obtained. As optics became increasingly complex and diverse, manufacturers' catalogs expanded to include 100 to 200 different lenses; glass melts increasingly included special components such as oxides of heavy elements (high refractive index and low dispersion), chalcogenides (sulfide, selenide, telluride), halides such as fluorides (low refractive index and high dispersion) or phosphides, cerium-doped glasses to obtain radiation-resistant lenses, and so on.

Since the 1980s, however, glass catalogs have tended to become increasingly limited.

== Properties ==
The most important physical properties of glass for optical applications are refractive index and constringency, which are decisive in the design of optical systems, and transmission, glass strength and non-linear effects.

=== Index and constringency ===
Abbe diagram. The notations are the names given by Schott to the different families of optical lenses.

The refractive index indicates the refractive power of a glass, i.e. its ability to deflect light rays to a greater or lesser extent. This deflection can be deduced from Descartes's law. The refractive index is a wavelength-dependent quantity, creating chromatic aberrations in a system by refracting rays more or less according to their wavelength: This is the phenomenon observed when light is decomposed by a prism. Several laws have approximated this relationship to wavelength, notably Cauchy's law and Sellmeier equation.

The refractive index of a glass is given for the yellow line known as the d-line of helium (then noted n_{d}) or for the green e-line of mercury (then noted n_{e}), depending on usage and the two main standards used.

The dependence of refractive index on wavelength requires a measure of the glass's dispersion, i.e. the difference in deviation between two wavelengths. A highly dispersive glass will deflect short wavelengths to a great extent, but long wavelengths to a lesser extent. The measure of dispersion is the Abbe number, or constringence. The main dispersion is the difference n_{F} − n_{C} (helium lines) or n′_{F} − n′_{C} (cadmium lines), and constringencies for the same lines as the refractive index are deduced by $\nu_d=\frac{n_d-1}{n_F-n_C}$ and $\nu_e=\frac{n_e-1}{n_F'-n_C'}$. A high Abbe number means that the glass is not very dispersive, and vice versa.

Table of spectral lines used to measure refractive indices
Wavelength (nm)	Designation	Source
2325.4		Hg IR Line
1970.1		Hg IR Line
1529.6		Hg IR Line
1013.98	t	H IR Line
852.1101	s	Cs IR Line
706.5188	r	Red He Line
656.2725	C	Red H Line
643.8469	C'	Red Cd Line
632.8		Laser He-Ne Line
589.2938	D	Yellow Na Line (Note: The yellow spectral line of sodium is in fact a doublet. The wavelength used is that of the middle of the two sodium lines.)
587.5618	d	Yellow He Line
546.074	e	Green Hg Line
486.1327	F	Blue H Line
479.9914	F'	Blue Cd Line
435.8343	g	Blue Hg Line
404.6561	h	Violet Hg Line
365.0146	i	Hg UV Line

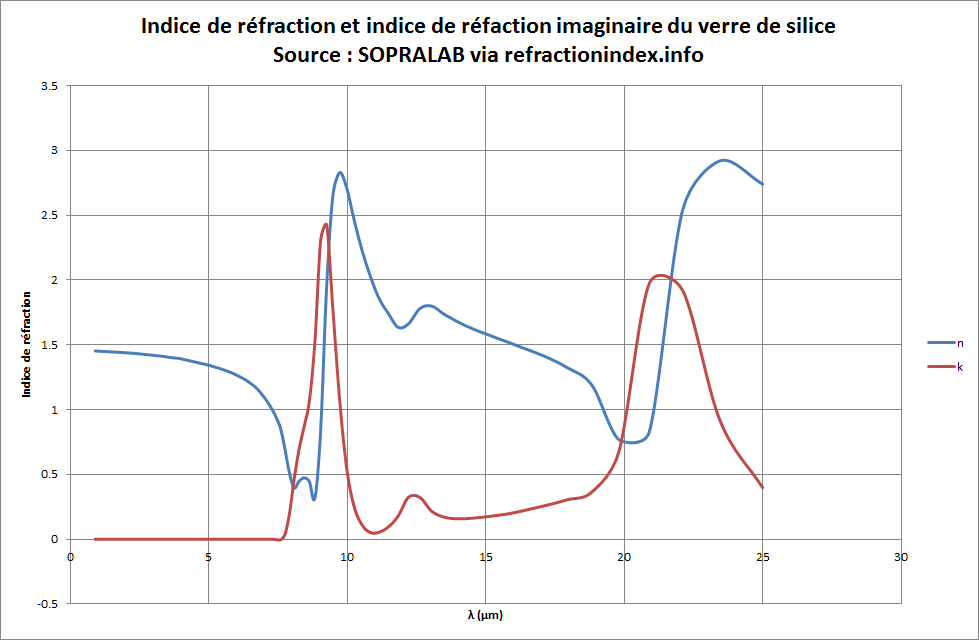
Real and imaginary refractive indices for quartz or fused silica glass in the IR range.

Lenses are usually divided into two groups with the generic names of crown and flint, referring respectively to low-dispersion, low-index lenses and high-dispersion, high-index lenses. Typically, the distinction is made at around ν_{d} = 50: lenses below this value are flints, the others are crowns.

These two parameters alone are needed to differentiate between lenses: two lenses with equal n_{d} and ν_{d} are identical. Glasses are represented on the so-called Abbe diagram, a graph with abscissa n_{d} and ordinate ν_{d}, where each glass is denoted by a point on the graph.

Oxide glasses fall into a range of n_{d} from 1.4 to 2.0, and ν_{d} from 20 to 90, with SiO_{2} being the oxide glass with the highest contringency and lowest index. Fluoride glasses can go up to ν_{d} > 100 and n_{d} < 1.4, BeF_{2} being the fluoride glass at the highest constringency and lowest index. Chalcogenide glasses have indexes exceeding 2, a large proportion of which cannot be shown on an Abbe diagram due to their absorption in visible wavelengths preventing a relevant νd measurement. For optical materials that are opaque in the visible range, constringence is measured at longer wavelengths.

This classification also has its limitations when it comes to active optical glasses (birefringence, acousto-optic effect, and non-linear effects), optical filters or graded-index lenses, so we restrict the term "classical optical glass" to the aforementioned glasses, i.e. those with limited index and dispersion, which can be described essentially by their dispersive behavior and refractive index.

=== Transmission and absorption ===
Another very important characteristic of optical glass is its absorption and transmission behaviour. The use to which the future lens will be put determines its behavior: filters that absorb in certain spectral bands, lenses that are highly transparent in the visible, ultraviolet or infrared, resistance to radiation.

As a general rule, the transmittance of the glass is given by the manufacturer, noted τ_{i} or T_{i}, a value that depends on the thickness of the material and whose measurement makes it possible to take into account the loss of transmission due to absorption and diffusion by internal defects in the glass. Since the transmittance term takes into account the refractive index via the Fresnel coefficient $\textstyle 2n/(n^2+1)$, it is also dependent on the wavelength and thickness of the sample via the formula $\tau _2 = \tau _1^{d_1/d_2}$ where $\tau$ is the transmittance and $d$ the material thickness.

Transmittance windows are of particular interest when it comes to choosing the right glass for applications such as far-infrared or far-ultraviolet. These windows are the result of the absorption of the materials making up the glass, which increases in the infrared and ultraviolet. Absorption in these two wavelength ranges is due to distinct phenomena, and can evolve differently depending on environmental conditions.

==== Ultraviolet absorption ====
In the ultraviolet (UV), the drop in transmission is due to the electronic transitions of the elements making up the glass: valence electrons absorb wavelengths whose energy corresponds to their band gap. According to solid-state band theory, electrons can only take on certain specific energy values in particular energy levels, but with sufficient energy, an electron can move from one of these levels to another. Light waves are charged with an energy hν, inversely proportional to wavelength (ν = c/λ), which can enable an electron to pass from one level to another if this energy is sufficient and therefore if the wavelength is short enough. A silica glass absorbs wavelengths below 160 nm, a glass based on boron trioxide (B_{2}O_{3}) absorbs below 172 nm, a phosphorus pentoxide glass (P_{2}O_{5}) absorbs below 145 nm.

Given the chemical structure of glassy silica, the proportion of non-bridging oxygen will determine its ultraviolet transmission.

There are two types of oxygen in oxide glasses: bridging and non-bridging (possessing an excess electron charge), detectable by photoelectron spectroscopy. Non-bridging oxygen possesses electrons whose kinetic energy after release by monochromatic X-rays is higher than that of bridging oxygen. Bonds between non-bridging oxygens and cations are generally ionic. These characteristics give the glass its energetic band properties, making it more or less effective at transmitting radiation. Depending on the intensity of the bonds with the cations in the glass, the transmission window varies: in the presence of alkali metals, electrons can move from one band to the other more easily, as they are less bound to the non-bridging oxygens. On the other hand, the introduction of aluminium (Al_{2}O_{3}) to replace silica will increase the glass's transmission window, as the tetrahedral configuration of alumina reduces the proportion of non-contacting oxygens and therefore of electrons able to move from the valence band to the conduction band.

As a result, glasses containing heavy metals (such as Ti^{+} or Pb^{2+}) tend to transmit less well than others, since the oxygen will tend to share its electrons with the cation and thus reduce the band gap. The disadvantage is that the addition of these metals results in higher refractive indices. Depending on the heavy metal used, the drop in UV transmission will be more or less rapid, so lead lenses transmit better than niobium or titanium lenses. Attention to crucible and furnace materials is therefore very important, as these can also influence the UV transmission window. Platinum, for example, is widely used in glass melting, but inclusions of platinum particles in the glass paste can cause undesirable transmission losses due to impurities.

Another source of variation in UV transmission loss is ambient temperature: the higher the temperature of the glass, the more the UV drop will shift towards longer wavelengths, due to the material's reduced band gap.

Solarization, which is the exposure of glass (or paint, for that matter) to electromagnetic radiation, can "yellow" glass (Note: Lens yellowing refers to the slightly yellow coloration of lenses with low blue transmission.) depending on the wavelength and intensity of the radiation. Lenses with the best UV transmission are the most affected by solarization, which modifies their transmission window. Lenses can be doped with cerium dioxide (CeO_{2}), which shifts the transmission drop to longer wavelengths and stabilizes it. This doping is one of the processes used to create anti-radiation glasses, since a glass doped in this way has the particular ability to protect against the most energetic types of radiation, such as X-rays and gamma rays.

==== Infrared absorption ====
In infrared (IR), the physical phenomena leading to a drop in transmission are different. When a molecule receives a given amount of energy, it begins to vibrate in different modes: fundamental, first harmonic, second harmonic, etc., corresponding to periodic movements of the atoms in the molecule; each frequency associated with the energy of the molecule's vibration mode is absorbed.

In silica glass, the Si−O bond has two main modes of vibration, rotation and elongation. Since the frequency of elongation is 0.34×10^{14} Hz, absorption will take place at 8.8 μm (fundamental), 4.4 μm (harmonic 1), 2.9 μm (harmonic 2), etc. As the absorption due to this vibration is very strong, silica becomes opaque from the first harmonic onwards. Most quartz glasses even show a marked drop in transmission at harmonic 2.

Chalcogenide glasses are used to reduce the frequency of molecular vibrations: as sulfur or selenium are heavier, their vibration modes are weaker, and their transmission is, therefore, better in the infrared. However, this comes at the price of visible transmission, since chalcogenide glasses are opaque in the visible. Another solution is to produce halide glasses, in particular fluoride glasses. As fluorine is highly electronegative, the bonds between anions and cations are weakened, and vibrations are therefore weaker.

Glass humidity, i.e. the presence of water in the material, has a strong influence on the transmission curve of glasses in the 2.9–4.2 μm region. Water takes the form of OH^{−} groups, whose O−H bond vibrates at a frequency of around 90 THz, equivalent to an absorption of wavelengths from 2.9 to 3.6 μm. The higher the humidity of the sample, the greater the local drop in transmission, with very high humidity even causing absorption at the harmonics of the O−H bond vibration, at around 200 nm.

=== Emission and non-linear phenomena ===
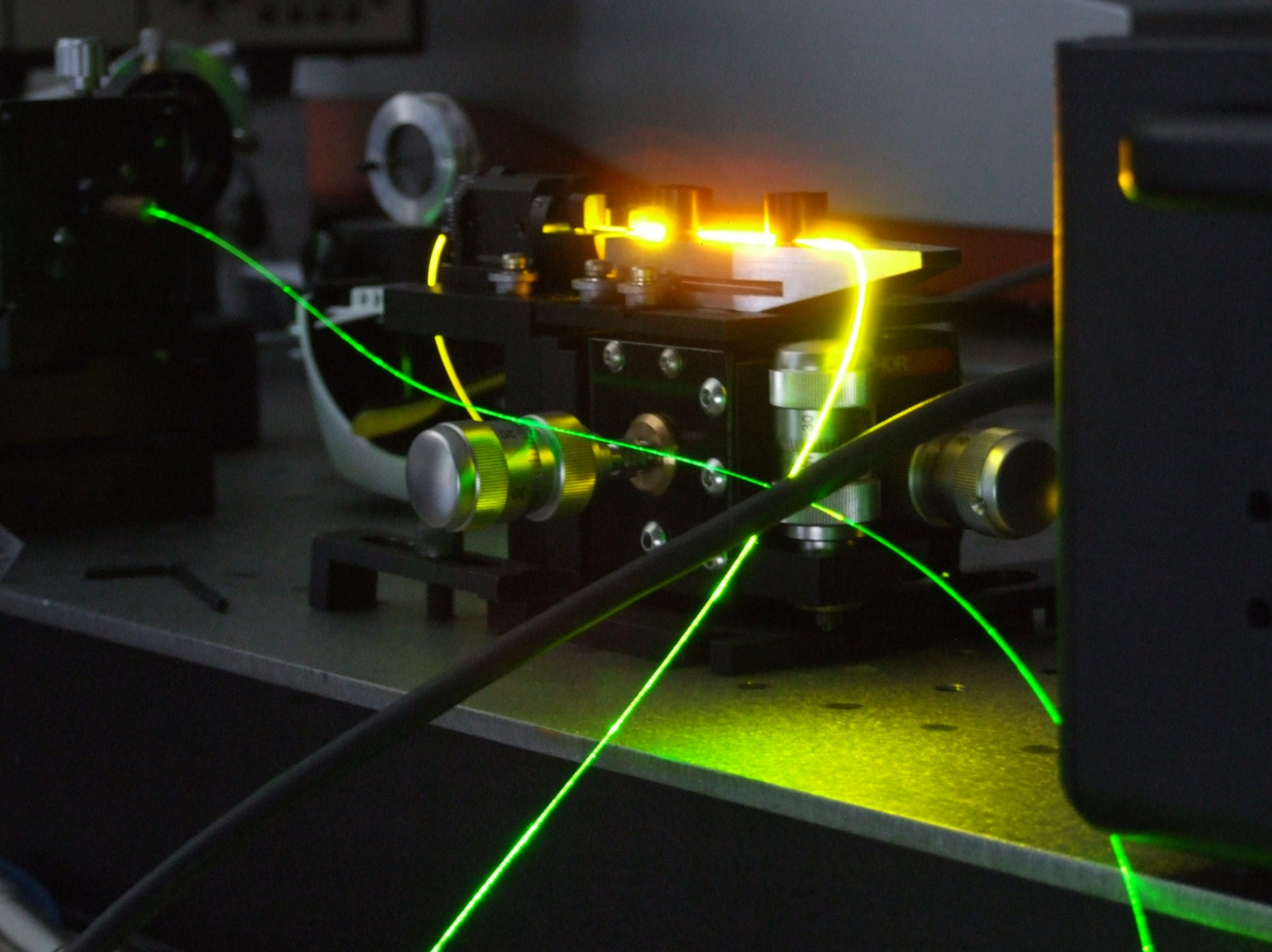
Injecting an optical supercontinuum into an optical fiber

Lasers are often used at very high illuminance levels. It has been found that in this high illumination range, the refractive index follows a law that deviates from the linear domain and becomes proportional to the intensity of the luminous flux:
$$n(\lambda,I)=n_0(\lambda)+\gamma I$$
where n is the refractive index of the material; λ is the wavelength; I is the intensity of the light beam; n is the refractive index for low powers; and γ is the refractive proportionality for high illuminance levels. For silica, for example, γ = 3.2×10^{−20} m^{2}/W for λ = 1060 nm. The most dispersive glasses tend to have the highest non-linear refractive indices, probably due to the metal ions present in the glass.

Above 1 TW/mm^{2}, the fluence (or flux) is sufficient to create higher-order non-linear optical phenomena such as multiphonon absorption and avalanche photo-ionization. The first phenomenon makes the material absorbent through the addition of two photons, which release an electron. The second phenomenon is the acceleration of an electron released by the electromagnetic field, the electron's kinetic energy being transmitted to other neighboring electrons. These two combined effects can cause damage to glass by destroying the vitreous lattice (freed electrons give energy to other electrons which are more easily freed, and the lattice bonds are weakened by electron depletion). The material may be vaporized at sufficient speed that the phonons cannot transmit the energy in the form of heat to the rest of the glass.

In 1988, an experiment showed that silica, whose lattice is isotropic, is capable of emitting green radiation when crossed by powerful infrared radiation. The generation of a second harmonic in this setting is atypical, but could be explained by the presence of F-center.

Fluorescence can appear in optical glasses. Fluorescence is the re-emission of higher-wavelength radiation from an illuminated material. The energy of the incident light excites the material's electrons, which then de-excite and return to their ground state, emitting a photon with a longer wavelength than the original one. This phenomenon is particularly troublesome in applications where the presence of stray light or light of a different wavelength from the reference wavelength poses a problem. In lasers, for example, it's important to agree on a single, precise spectral line. Causes of fluorescence include rare-earth ions, impurities and color centers.

== Fabrication ==
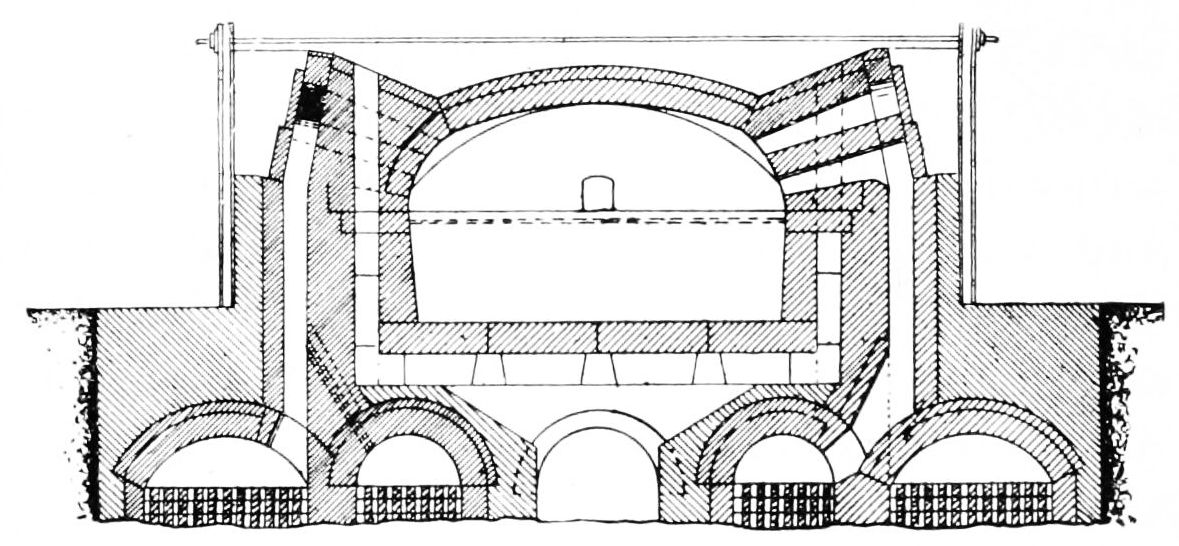
Siemens basin furnace, sectional view.

The basic materials used to manufacture optical lenses must be particularly pure, as any inclusion or impurity could not only degrade performance but also cause considerable damage to the lens (breakage, darkening, tinting, etc.). For example, the sand used to manufacture silica-based glass must contain an extremely low proportion of ferric oxide (Fe_{2}O_{3}) (10 ppm maximum) and even lower proportions of other oxides and elements (cobalt, copper, nickel, etc.). There are very few geographical sites where the sands are sufficiently pure for these applications.

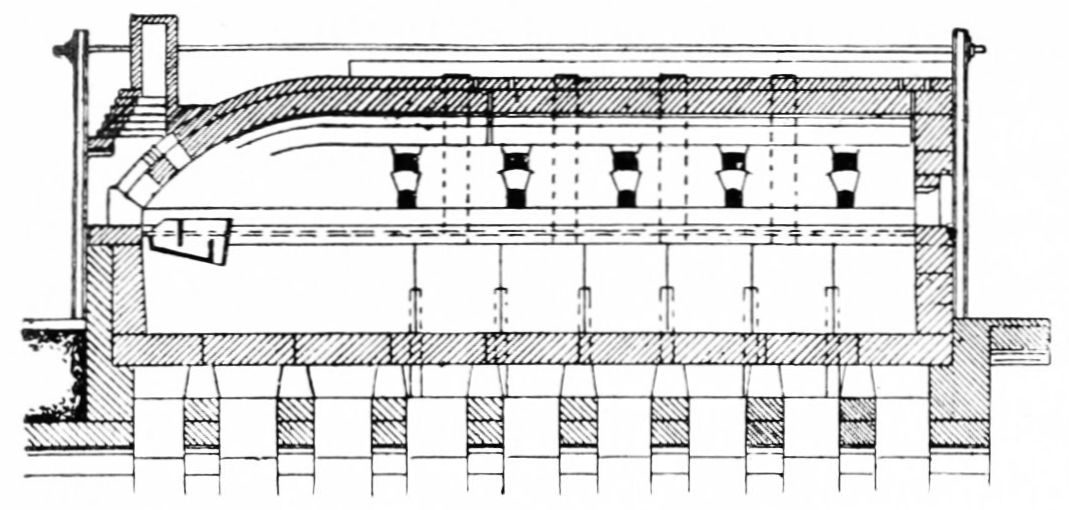
Siemens basin furnace, longitudinal view.

Most glass is melted in a pot furnace, which is used to melt limited quantities of glass, while certain mass-produced optical glasses (such as borosilicate glass) are melted in tank furnaces for continuous glass production.

The glassmaking process comprises a number of stages, beginning with the melting of the glass paste, followed by refining and then tempering or annealing, which are two different finishes. Finally, if required, the glass can be polished, particularly in the case of mirrors and lenses, for any application where the objective is high image quality.

The materials are placed together in the furnace and gradually heated to their melting point. Chemical reactions of composition or decomposition of molecules take place, resulting in significant off-gassing during this phase. Hydrates, carbonates, nitrates and sulfates recompose to form the glass paste with the vitrifying elements, giving rise to gases such as water vapor, carbon dioxide, sulfur dioxide and others. For example, 1 L of soda-lime glass paste releases around 1440 L of various gases when heated to 100 °C, of which 70% is carbon dioxide.

Refining is an essential stage in the quality of optical lenses, since it involves homogenizing the glass so that the components are evenly distributed throughout the paste and the gas is fully released. Homogenization avoids the problem of streaks appearing in the lens. Chemical agents are used to release the gases, in particular arsenic pentoxide (As_{2}O_{5}), which decomposes into arsenic trioxide (As_{2}O_{3}), releasing oxygen which combines with the other elements and gases released, causing the bubbles remaining in the paste to rise.

Defects such as bubbles, streaks, inclusions and discolorations can appear as a result of the glass melting process. Bubbles result from insufficient refining, streaks from glass heterogeneity (the glass has a different refractive index locally, causing distortion), inclusions may come from glass that has crystallized locally or from fragments of the vessels used for melting, glass discoloration originates from insufficient purity of the mixed products.

The tempering process is reserved for glass whose structure is to be hardened. Glass used for optics is often fragile and thin, so it is not tempered. Optical fibers are tempered after drawing, to give them sufficient mechanical strength.

Annealing consists in slowly cooling a glass in a controlled manner from a certain temperature at which it has begun to solidify (around 1000 °C for silica glass or 450 °C for soda-lime glass, for example). Annealing is necessary to eliminate internal stresses in the material that may have arisen during melting (impurities, streaks, bubbles, etc.) and to prevent uneven cooling in a material, with internal parts taking longer to heat and cool. The annealing time ranges from a hundred to a thousand hours, depending on the quantity of glass to be annealed and its composition.

== Types of glass ==
The progressive development of the optical glass industry has led to the creation of new lens families. Lenses can be differentiated by their main components, which give them their mechanical, thermal and optical characteristics.

In addition to the two main glass groups, flint and crown, based essentially on SiO_{2} silica or oxides, other groups exist, such as halide glasses and chalcogenide glasses (excluding oxygen).

The following tables summarize most glass families and their composition. Each composition has its own particular properties and defects. Increasing the index often requires sacrificing transmission in the ultraviolet, and although research since the early days of glassmaking has considerably improved this state of affairs, it is not possible to obtain highly dispersive, low-refractive glasses, or low-dispersive, high-refractive glasses.

=== Oxide glass ===
Glass types and main components (This list is not intended to be all-encompassing)
Glass type	Composition (Note: 'R' designates an alkaline, 'M' an alkaline-earth metal)
Borosilicate crown	SiO_{2}-B_{2}O_{3}-R_{2}O-BaO
Phosphate crown	P_{2}O_{5}-B_{2}O_{3}-R_{2}O-BaO
Phosphate dense crown	P_{2}O_{5}-(B,Al)_{2}O_{3}-R_{2}O-MO
Fluorocrown	SiO_{2}-B_{2}O_{3}-K_{2}O-KF
Crown	SiO_{2}-R_{2}O-(Ca,Ba)O
Zinc crown	(SiO_{2},B_{2}O_{3})-ZnO
Baryum crown	(SiO_{2},B_{2}O_{3})-BaO-R_{2}O
Baryum dense crown	SiO_{2}-B_{2}O_{3}-BaO
Baryum extra dense crown	SiO_{2}-B_{2}O_{3}-BaO
Lanthane crown	(SiO_{2},B_{2}O_{3})-La_{2}O_{3}-ZnO-MO
Lanthane dense crown	(SiO_{2},B_{2}O_{3})-La_{2}O_{3}-ZnO-MO
|Long special crown	B_{2}O_{3}-Al_{2}O_{3}-MF_{2}
Short Flint	SiO_{2}-B_{2}O_{3}-R_{2}O-Sb_{2}O_{3}
Short dense flint	(B_{2}O_{3},Al_{2}O_{3})-PbO-MO
Crown flint	SiO_{2}-R_{2}O-PbO-MO
Extra light flint	SiO_{2}-R_{2}O-PbO-MO
Light flint	SiO_{2}-R_{2}O-PbO-MO
Flint	SiO_{2}-R_{2}O-PbO-MO
Dense flint	SiO_{2}-R_{2}O-MO-TiO_{2}
Dense special flint	SiO_{2}-R_{2}O-MO-TiO_{2}
Baryum light flint	SiO_{2}-B_{2}O_{3}-BaO-PbO-R_{2}O
Baryum flint	SiO_{2}-B_{2}O_{3}-BaO-PbO-R_{2}O
Baryum dense flint	SiO_{2}-B_{2}O_{3}-BaO-PbO-R_{2}O
Lanthane flint	(SiO_{2},B_{2}O_{3})-La_{2}O_{3}-PbO-MO
Lanthane dense flint	(SiO_{2},B_{2}O_{3})-La_{2}O_{3}-PbO-MO
Fluoroberyllate	BeF_{2}-AF_{3}RF-MF_{2}
Fluoroaluminate	AlF_{3}RF-MF_{2}-(Y,La)F_{3}
Fluorophosphate	P_{2}O_{5}-AlF_{3}-RF-MF_{2}
Fluorozirconate	ZrF_{4}-RF-MF_{2}-(Y,La)F_{3}
Fluoroindate	InF_{3}-MF_{2}-ZnF_{2}-ZrF_{4}-(Ga,Yb)F_{3}
Titane crown	SiO_{2}(B_{2}O_{3})-TiO_{2}-Al_{2}O_{3}-KF
Titane flint	SiO_{2}(B_{2}O_{3})-TiO_{2}-Al_{2}O_{3}-KF
Titane dense flint	SiO_{2}(B_{2}O_{3})-TiO_{2}-Al_{2}O_{3}-KF
Tantale crown	B_{2}O_{3}-La_{2}O_{3}-(Gd,Y)_{2}O_{3}-(Ta,Nb)_{2}O_{5}
Tantale flint	B_{2}O_{3}-La_{2}O_{3}-(Gd,Y)_{2}O_{3}-(Ta,Nb)_{2}O_{5}
Tantale dense flint	B_{2}O_{3}-La_{2}O_{3}-(Gd,Y)_{2}O_{3}-(Ta,Nb)_{2}O_{5}
Niobium flint	B_{2}O_{3}-La_{2}O_{3}-ZnO-Nb_{2}O_{5}
Niobium dense flint	(B_{2}O_{3},SiO_{2})-La_{2}O_{3}-ZnO-(Ti,Zr)O_{2}

Flints and crowns are glasses composed of oxides, often SiO_{2} or TiO_{2} titanates. Their index ranges from 1.4 to 2.4. This large group can be identified by its characteristic transmission profile ranging from 200 nm to 2.5 μm, due to the high gap energies and photon absorption peaks of hydroxy groups in the infrared.

A variety of oxides are used, the most common being silica-based glasses, but other molecules can also be used to form glassy systems, such as:

- germanium dioxide (GeO_{2});
- diboron trioxide (B_{2}O_{3});
- phosphorus pentoxide (P_{2}O_{5});
- aluminosilicates and borosilicates;
- phosphates.

Phosphate glasses have lower melting temperatures and are more viscous than borosilicate glasses, but they are less resistant to chemical attack and less durable. Glasses based on a phosphate, borate or borophosphate vitreous system are good candidates for athermalization, since their variation in refractive index with respect to temperature ($\textstyle dn/dT$) is generally negative. Athermalization consists in compensating for thermal expansion of the material by changing its index. The family of phosphate glasses is particularly well-suited to these possibilities.

==== Crown glass family ====
Borosilicate crowns are the most widely produced glass family, and the ones with the best control over final homogeneity. This family includes BK_{7}, the glass widely used in optics. Alkali oxides and boron trioxide B_{2}O_{3} make it easier to melt silicon dioxide SiO_{2}, which requires very high temperatures to liquefy.

Barium crowns and dense crowns were developed for barium's ability to significantly increase the refractive index without significantly reducing the glass's constringency or ultraviolet transmission, which lead oxide tends to do. Some lenses use a mixture of zinc oxide (ZnO) and barium oxide (BaO).

Crowns, zinc crowns and crown flints are small families of glasses containing a wide variety of oxides (CaO or BaO, ZnO, and PbO respectively) to increase hardness or durability.

Phosphate crowns are characterized by their relatively low dispersion and medium index, with generally higher dispersion in the blue, making them useful for correcting chromatism in optical combinations.

Fluorine crowns use fluorine's properties to reduce the dispersion and index of the glass: fluorine's high electronegativity and the smaller radius of fluorine ions are responsible for this. As with phosphate crowns, these lenses are particularly suitable for correcting chromatic aberration, thanks to their partial dispersion in the blue.

==== Flint glass family ====
Dense or light flints are long-established families, such as borosilicate crowns, and are used as optical glass as well as crystal for everyday glassmaking. Their main properties derive from the proportion of PbO introduced. PbO increases refractive index while decreasing Abbe number, and also affects partial dispersion. Lead oxide will also increase the density of the glass and reduce its resistance to chemical attack. The ability of the PbO−SiO_{2} couple to vitrify enables PbO proportions of over 70 mol per 100 to be achieved, which would not be possible if PbO were merely a chemical mesh modifier. Indeed, a high PbO concentration produces tetrahedral PbO_{4}, which can form a glass-like mesh.

The inclusion of PbO has several drawbacks. Firstly, the glasses are slightly yellow due to the high concentration of lead oxide. Secondly, inclusions and impurities such as iron(III) oxide Fe_{2}O_{3} or chromium(III) oxide Cr_{2}O_{3} degrade glass transmission to a far greater extent than in soda, potash or lime glasses. Thirdly, a chemical equilibrium between Pb^{2+} and Pb^{4+} is established and, in the presence of oxygen-saturated glass, leads to the creation of lead dioxide PbO_{2}, a brown compound that darkens glass. However, this latter coloration can be reversed by a redox transformation of the glass paste, since it does not originate from impurities.

Structure of La_{2}O_{3}, used in lanthanum glasses, flints and crowns.

To overcome these problems, titanium dioxide TiO_{2} and zirconium dioxide ZrO_{2} can be added, increasing the glass's chemical stability and preserving its ultraviolet transmission.

Barium flints crystallize less easily than other glass families due to the presence of lead(II) oxide (PbO) in the mixture. The higher the proportion of PbO, the higher the refractive index and the lower the melting temperature, so these are glasses which, although very useful for their high indexes, present complications during melting. The BaO in these glasses is sometimes replaced by ZnO.

Lanthanum flints and lanthanum crowns are extended families achieving high refractive indices with medium dispersion. The use of SiO_{2} in the paste creates crystallization instabilities, a pitfall avoided by replacing silica with boron trioxide (B_{2}O_{3} and divalent oxides. To further increase their refractive index, the use of multiple oxides has become widespread, including gadolinium, yttrium, titanium, niobium, tantalum, tungsten, and zirconium oxides (Gd_{2}O_{3}, Y_{2}O_{3}, TiO_{2}, Nb_{2}O_{5}, Ta_{2}O_{5}, WO_{3}, and ZrO_{2}).

Short flints are a family distinguished not by their index or constringency, but by their partial dispersion. Named for their narrow blue spectrum, short flints are also an asset in optical system design for their low blue impact. They are obtained by replacing the lead oxide in flint glasses with antimony oxide (Sb_{2}O_{3}).

=== Halogenide glass ===
Structure of BeF_{2} beryllium fluoride glass. Its amorphous structure is very similar to that of silica. Fluoroberyllate glasses have an index of around 1.4, a constringency of 80 and transmit up to 150 nm.

The first fluoride glasses appeared around 1970 to meet a growing need for mid-infrared transmitting glasses. These glasses are composed by replacing the oxygen in oxide glasses with a halogen, fluorine or chlorine, and more rarely with heavy halogens. Their transmission covers the visible and mid-infrared range, from 200 nm to 7 μm, due to the rather high band gap (on average, a fluoride glass has its transmission dip at around 250 nm, due to its band gap of around 5 eV) and the low-frequency vibrations of the heavy-metal fluoride bonds; silica absorption results from vibrations of Si−O bonds at 1.1×10^{3} cm^{−1}, whereas fluorozirconate absorption will result from vibrations of Zr−F bonds at a frequency of 0.58×10^{3} cm^{−1}, which is why oxide and halide glasses behave so differently in the infrared.

By using rare earths instead of heavy metals, we obtain a rare-earth fluoride glass that transmits even further into the infrared. Another way of transmitting further into the infrared is to make chloride glass instead of fluoride glass, but this reduces the stability of the glass. A type of glass recently developed at the University of Rennes uses a tellurium halide. As the energy gap in the visible is greater, the drop in transmission in the visible advances to 700 nm – 1.5 μm, while its transmission improves in the far infrared. As the refractive index of such a glass is very high, it behaves like a chalcogenide glass, with a strong reflection that reduces its transmission.

Fluoride lenses are also useful for their near-UV transmission. Near-UV transmitting glasses are few in number, but include lithium fluoride, calcium fluoride and magnesium fluoride glasses.

=== Chalcogenide glass ===
Chalcogenide glasses have been specifically developed since the 1980s to improve the infrared transmission of optical glasses. Oxygen is replaced by another chalcogen (sulfur, selenium, tellurium), and silicon is replaced by heavier metals such as germanium, arsenic, antimony and others. Their index is greater than 2, and they appear black due to their weak gap and multiple absorption bands in the visible range. The transmission of these glasses ranges from 1 to 12 μm, but is lower than that of oxide or halide glasses due to their very high refractive index, which results in a high reflection coefficient.

This group can be divided into two families: glasses that can be doped with rare-earth ions or not. The former are mainly composed of germanium and gallium sulfides and selenides, while the latter, although not doped, offer the best transmission performance in the far infrared.

== Classical glass designations ==
The field of optical lenses encompasses a multitude of materials with extremely diverse properties and equally diverse applications. Nevertheless, it is generally accepted that optical lenses fall into several major families. A large proportion of optical lenses are so-called "classic" lenses, designed for applications such as imaging and filtering. Smaller families of lenses are also part of the optical glass family, such as optical fibers, or so-called "active" lenses for applications in nonlinear optics or acousto-optics, for example.

== Special glasses ==
=== Fused quartz ===
Quartz glass is distinguished from other optical glass by the source of the material used in its manufacture. Many manufacturers produce quartz glass, but the differences lie mainly in the nature of the impurities and the water content. These differences give each quartz glass its own special characteristics, such as transmission and resistance to chemical attack.

Quartz glass is made from a single material: silica. Its main properties are low expansion (α ≈ 0.5×10^{−6} K^{−1}), high thermal stability (up to 1,000 K) and transmission in the ultraviolet and infrared, which can be adapted as required.

=== Optical filter ===
Filters are glasses designed to transmit only certain parts of the spectrum of incident light. A filter can be colorless, a simple optical glass whose transmission drop serves to cut off wavelengths beyond a certain value, or colored in various ways, by the introduction of heavy metal or rare-earth ions, by molecular coloration or even by a colloidal suspension. Filter glasses show noticeable photoluminescence.

Optical filters in colored glass take the form of a blade with a parallel face and a thickness that depends on the transmission qualities required; like electronic filters, they are referred to as high-pass, low-pass, band-pass or notch filters.

=== Laser lenses ===
Several types of glass are used for lasers, including Li_{2}O−CaO−SiO_{2} glasses for their resistance to thermal shock, and potassium-barium-phosphate glasses, whose effective cross-section is large enough for stimulated emission. The addition of sodium, lithium or aluminum oxides drastically reduces distortion. These glasses are athermalized. In addition to these two types of glass, lithium-aluminum phosphates can be used. These are treated by ion exchange and are particularly resistant, making them ideal for applications where the average laser power is very high (e.g. femtosecond pulsed lasers), or fluorophosphates, which have a slightly non-linear index.

These Nd^{3+}-doped glasses are used as active laser medium.

=== Gradient index lenses ===
Gradient-index lenses exploit the special properties of light propagation in a variable-index medium. In 1854, James Clerk Maxwell invented the "Fisheye lens" in response to a problem from the Irish Academy asking for the refractive index of an image-perfect material. This theoretical lens, spherical in shape, has an index of the form
$$n(r) = \frac{2}{1+(r/R)^2}$$
where $n$ is the refractive index of the glass at a point on the spherical lens and $R$ the radius of this lens; it enables any point on its surface to be imaged perfectly at another point diametrically opposite. A generalization of this spherical lens was proposed in 1966 by de:Rudolf Karl Lüneburg, using a different index profile. In 1905, Robert Williams Wood developed a lens consisting of a blade with a parallel face whose index varies parabolically, with the extremum of the index lying on the axis of revolution of the component. The Wood lens can be used to focus or diverge rays, just like a conventional lens.

Since around 1970, glass manufacturing technology has made it possible to develop, qualify and machine graded-index glasses. Two main uses for graded-index glasses are in telecommunications, with optical fibers, and in imaging, with lenses machined from graded-index material. Gradients can also be divided into three types of profile: spherical gradients, cylindrical gradients and axial gradients.

There are several techniques for producing graded-index glass: neutron bombardment, ion filling or glass layer superposition. Depending on the technique used, the gradient will be stronger or weaker, and its profile more or less controlled. Injection or ionic filling methods can produce gradients of 10–50 mm, with an index amplitude of 0.04. Neutron bombardment and chemical vapor deposition methods produce shallow gradients (approx. 100 μm) of low amplitude. For larger gradients, there is partial lens polymerization of a monomer reacting to UV exposure (gradients of around one hundred millimeters for an index amplitude of 0.01), or superimposing and then partially melting layers of borosilicate or flint glass (lanthanum-containing glasses are not suitable for this technique due to their recrystallization problems and thermal instability). A final technique consists of melting and then rotating the paste so that a material gradient, and therefore an index gradient, is established in the glass.

=== Doped lenses ===
Certain extreme environments are not conducive to the use of conventional lenses; when the system is exposed to far-field UV radiation (X-ray, gamma, etc.) or particle fluxes such as alpha or beta, a drop in lens transmission is observed, due to discoloration of the material. Generally speaking, electromagnetic radiation causes a drop in blue transmission, a phenomenon known as solarization. As this is detrimental to system performance, it was necessary to develop new types of radiation-resistant lenses.

Radiation has a variety of effects: ionization, electron or hole capture, fission of Si−O bonds, etc. These effects can easily be amplified by the presence of impurities that change the valence of molecules or concentrate radiation, causing local degradation of the glass.

In order to reduce the drop in glass transmission and performance, they are doped with CeO_{2}, which slightly shifts the glass's transmission drop, but makes it virtually impossible to feel the effects of radiation on the glass's optical performance.

=== Other glasses ===
VLT primary mirror. The molten Zerodur is placed on a rotating mold.

In addition to the lenses already mentioned, all of which are specific in their design or use, there are also special glass-like materials.

These include athermalized lenses, which are produced in such a way that the optical path through the lens is independent of temperature. Note that the difference in optical path as a function of temperature is
$$\begin{align} \Delta L
&= s(\alpha(n-1)+dn/dt)\Delta T \\
&= sGT,
\end{align}$$
determined by $s$ the thickness of the glass, $\alpha$ the coefficient of thermal expansion, $n$ the index, $T$ the temperature and $G$ the thermo-optic coefficient. Athermalized glasses can be found in the fluorinated crowns, phosphate crowns, dense crowns, barium and titanium flints and other families.

Glass-ceramics or ceramic glasses are glasses in which the crystal-forming process has been stimulated over a long, complex heating period. The addition of crystals to initiate crystallization results in a glass with a crystallized proportion ranging from 50% to 90%. Depending on the crystals incorporated and the proportion of glass in the ceramic glass, the properties will differ. Generally speaking, ceramic glass is highly resistant to thermal shock and has near-zero thermal expansion (Schott AG's Zerodur, for example, was used specifically for the Very Large Telescope for these thermal properties).

== Glass quality ==
There are numerous standards for optical components, the aim of which is to unify the notations and tolerances applied to components, and to define optical quality standards. There are two main standards: MIL (American military standard) and ISO (international standard). In France, the AFNOR standard is very similar to the ISO standard, as the Union de normalisation de la mécanique is keen to conform as closely as possible to ISO publications.

The MIL and ISO standards cover a very wide field, and both standardize lenses, their defects, surface treatments, test methods and schematic representations.

Scope of MIL and ISO standards
Reference	Field of application
MIL-G-174	Optical glass
MIL-C-675	Treatment of optical glass components
MIL-A-3920	Adhesives and optical thermal setting
MIL-M-13508	Mirrors, glass, aluminized surfaces for optical components
MIL-A-14443	Adhesives, glass-to-metal bonding for lenses
MIL-O-16898	Packaging optical elements
MIL-PRF-13830B	Manufacture, assembly and inspection of optical components
NF ISO 10110	Optics and optical instruments. Guidance on drawings for optical elements and systems.: Material imperfections (stress birefringence, bubbles and inclusions); Surface shape tolerances; Centering tolerances; Surface imperfection tolerances; Surface treatment and coating
NF ISO 10629	Raw optical glass. Resistance to attack by aqueous alkaline solutions at 50 °C
NF ISO 9211	Optics and optical instruments. Optical treatments.: Specific test methods

== Manufacturers ==
There are a number of manufacturers of special lenses for the various fields of optics, whose catalogs offer a wide choice of optical lenses and special lenses, sometimes in addition to filters and active lenses and crystals. Since 1980, however, catalogs have tended to reduce the choice, although optical design tools continue to include catalogs that no longer exist. Manufacturers include the following: (Note: "Zemax catalog" [archive], on radiantzemax.com Zemax lists some of the lens catalogs available by default in the software, a list that overlaps that of Code V, another optical design software.)

- Schott AG
- Heraeus Quarzglas
- Ohara Corporation
- Hoya Corporation
- Corning Inc. : Lens catalog not available, but Corning lenses remain available on optical design software and production of special lenses continues.
- Pilkington : has refocused its catalog on ophthalmic and flat lenses.
- Sumita Optical Glass
- Hikari Glass : a Nikon subsidiary producing optical lenses.
- OAO Lytkarinski Zavod Optitcheskogo Stekla
- CDGM (Note: "[CODEV Catalog]" [archive], on opticalres.com Code V lists the catalogs available and downloadable in the software and includes the CDGM catalog as well as another CHINA which could correspond to Chinaoptics [archive] whose entire catalog is Inquiry, on request.)

In addition to catalogs of optical glass and various materials, other manufacturers also sell active or special optical glass. Examples include graded-index glass, used to focus light beams in optical fibers; optical fibers, which in a significant proportion of cases are spun optical glass wires; and optical filters. These products can be found in the catalogs of a larger number of manufacturers, a non-exhaustive but relevant list of which can be found in the same catalogs selected by optical design software: (Note: "Zemax catalog" [archive], on radiantzemax.com Zemax lists some of the lens catalogs available by default in the software, a list that overlaps that of Code V, another optical design software.)

- 3M Precision Optics
- Archer Optx
- Coherent
- CVI
- Edmund Industrial Optic
- Esco
- Geltech
- ISP Optics
- JML
- LightPath Technologies
- Linos Photonics
- Melles Griot
- Midwest Optical
- Newport Glass
- NSG America
- Optics for Research
- OptoSigma
- Philips
- Quantum
- Rolyn Optics
- Ross Optical
- Special Optics
- Thorlabs

== Applications ==
Optical glasses are mainly used in many optical instruments, as lenses or mirrors. These include, but are not limited to, telescopes, microscopes, photographic lenses and viewfinder lenses. Other possible optical systems include collimators and eyepieces.

Optical lenses, especially ophthalmic lenses, are used for prescription glasses. Glasses can also be made of photochromic glass, whose tint changes according to radiation.

Optical glasses are used for other, much more diverse and specialized applications, such as high-energy particle detectors (glasses detecting Cherenkov radiation, scintillation effects, etc.) and nuclear applications, such as on-board optics in systems subjected to radiation, for example.

Optical glass can be spun to form an optical fiber or form graded-index lenses (SELFOC lens or Geltech lenses) for injection into these same fibers.

Optical glass in one form or another, doped or undoped, can be used as an amplifying medium for lasers.

Last but not least, microlithography, using ultraviolet-transmitting glasses such as Schott's FK5HT (Flint crown), LF5HT (Flint light) or LLF1HT (Flint extra light), named i-line glasses by the company after the ray i of mercury.
