= Grand River Aseptic Manufacturing =

Clinical and commercial sterile manufacturing contractor

Grand River Aseptic Manufacturing (GRAM)
- Type: Private company
- Industry: Pharmaceuticals
- Founded: 2010
- Headquarters: Grand Rapids, Michigan, U.S.
- Key people: Denis Johnson, CEO, Nick Bykerk, Chief Financial Officer
- Services: Clinical and commercial sterile manufacturing
- Number of employees: 825 (2026)
- Website: grandriverasepticmfg.com

Grand River Aseptic Manufacturing (GRAM) is a private contract development and manufacturing organization (CDMO) based in Grand Rapids, Michigan, specializing in sterile injectable fill–finish services for vials, syringes, and cartridges. Founded in 2010 by the Van Andel Institute and Grand Valley State University, GRAM has grown significantly under Arlington Capital Partners’ ownership since 2017, expanding to over 450,000 square feet across five facilities. The company provides clinical and commercial-scale manufacturing, terminal sterilization, and analytical testing, and has supported U.S. government vaccine initiatives for COVID-19 and monkeypox. GRAM has been recognized multiple times on the Inc. 5000 list and for its workplace excellence.

== History ==
GRAM was founded in 2010 by Van Andel Institute and Grand Valley State University.

In 2017, Arlington Capital Partners, a private equity firm in Washington, D.C. took a majority ownership stake in GRAM.

In June 2020, GRAM finished a $60 million expansion to install a 61,500-square-foot fill-finish injectable facility on the same site to triple GRAM's manufacturing footprint to more than 100,000 square feet of production space.

In 2020, BARDA and Johnson & Johnson contracted with GRAM to do fill and finish services for vaccines in response to the coronavirus pandemic. GRAM agreed with Janssen Pharmaceuticals, one of the companies of Johnson & Johnson, to support the manufacture of its SARS-CoV-2 vaccine candidate, including technology transfer and fill and finish manufacture.

In June 2020, GRAM finished a $60 million expansion to install another fill-finish injectables facility with the plan to market it to U.S. drugmakers. The 61,500-square-foot facility included in that expansion tripled GRAM's manufacturing footprint to more than 100,000 square feet of production space.

GRAM chose SKAN isolators, a Bausch+Ströbel filler and an IMA lyophilizer. The facility was qualified in July 2020.

In August 2020, BARDA awarded GRAM a one-year, $160 million contract to provide fill and finish services for vaccines in response to the coronavirus pandemic.

In August 2021, GRAM opened a new 110,000 sq ft finishing and warehouse center on Patterson Avenue in Grand Rapids—its fourth GMP manufacturing facility—equipped with inspection suites, QC laboratories, walk-in coolers/freezers, and multiple truck bays.

The expansion included equipment such as an MG America labeling line with Dividella packaging and two Stevanato automated inspection systems, further increasing GRAM’s capacity for syringe, vial, and cartridge finishing operations.

In 2022 GRAM was contracted by HHS to fill and finish 2.5 million of the 5.5 million vials of JYNNEOS monkeypox vaccine ordered by the Department of Health and Human Services.

== Awards ==
From 2017 to 2023 Inc. Magazine ranked GRAM as one of the Inc. 5000 fastest-growing private companies in America. The company won West Michigan's Best and Brightest Companies to Work For in 2017 and 2020 to 2024. In 2021, the International Society for Pharmaceutical Engineering (ISPE) selected GRAM as the Facility of the Year Awards Winner (FOYA) for Special Recognition of Operational Agility: COVID-19.
