= Wilkosz =

Wilkosz is a Polish surname.

== People ==
- Jusup Wilkosz, German bodybuilder
- Witold Wilkosz, Polish mathematician, physicist, philosopher and popularizer of science

== See also ==
- Wilkosz, a part of the Polish Club system for bidding in contract bridge
- Wilkos, a surname
