= Wilco (disambiguation) =

Wilco is an American rock band.

Wilco may also refer to:

- Wilco (given name), a Dutch masculine given name
- "Wilco", a radio procedure word, meaning "I understand and will comply"
- Wilco (The Album), by Wilco, 2009
- Wilco: Learning How to Die, a book about the band, by Greg Kot
- Wilco (farm supply cooperative), an American chain of agricultural stores
- Wilco AG, a company producing equipment for the pharmaceutical industry
- Wilco, common name of the tree Anadenanthera colubrina
- Williamson County, Texas, sometimes abbreviated as "Wilco"
- Rob Wilco, a fictional character from the comic strip Get Fuzzy

== See also ==
- Wilko (disambiguation)
- Roger Wilco (disambiguation)
- WilcoHess, a joint venture of A. T. Williams Oil Co.
