= IAV (disambiguation) =

IAV may refer to:

- IAV GmbH, a German engineering company in the automotive industry
- Interim Armored Vehicle, a U.S. Army armored fighting vehicle acquisition program
- Influenza A virus, a virus causing influenza in birds and some mammals
