= Roger Wilco =

Roger Wilco may refer to:

- "Roger, Wilco", procedure words meaning "I have heard, I will comply"
- Roger Wilco (software), a VOIP client program for online multiplayer games
- Roger Wilco, a character from Space Quest
- "Roger Wilco", a song from Shawn Colvin's 2001 album Whole New You

== See also ==
- Roger, masculine given name or surname
- Wilco (disambiguation)
