= Wilco (given name) =

Wilco is a Dutch masculine given name, combining "Wil" from Willem ('William') and the -co or -ko ending common for nicknames in the province of Groningen. The name became relatively popular in the Netherlands after 1960. An alternative spelling is Wilko. People with the name include:

== Wilco ==
- Wilco Kelderman (born 1991), Dutch road bicycle racer
- Wilco van Kleef (born 1981), half of the tallest married couple
- Wilco Louw (born 1994), South African rugby player
- Wilco Melissant (born 1968), Dutch television director
- Wilco van Rooijen (born 1967), Dutch mountaineer and adventurer
- Wilco Zeelenberg (born 1966), Dutch motorcycle racer and team manager
- Wilco Zuijderwijk (born 1969), Dutch track cyclist

== Wilko ==
- Wilko Johnson (1947–2022), English musician
- Wilko Risser (born 1982), Namibian-German footballer
- Wilko de Vogt (born 1975), Dutch football goalkeeper

== See also ==
- Wilco (disambiguation)
