= IAV GmbH =

Company

IAV GmbH Ingenieurgesellschaft Auto und Verkehr
- Company type: Limited liability company: GmbH
- Industry: Automotive industry
- Founded: Berlin, Germany (1983)
- Founder: Prof. Dr. Hermann Appel
- Headquarters: Berlin, Germany
- Number of locations: 16 operations across Germany, several Subsidiaries
- Area served: Worldwide
- Key people: Jörg Astalosch (CEO), Martin Mahlke (CFO), Dr. Uwe Horn (CHRO)
- Services: Powertrain, Electronics and Vehicle Development
- Revenue: 896 million Euro (2023)
- Number of employees: 7,600 worldwide (2023)
- Website: IAV.com

IAV GmbH Ingenieurgesellschaft Auto und Verkehr, (literal Engineer Society Automobile and Traffic), abbreviated to IAV GmbH, is an engineering company in the automotive industry, designing products for powertrain, electronics and vehicle development. Founded in Berlin in 1983 by Prof. Dr. Hermann Appel as a university-affiliated research institute, the company employs over 8,000 members of staff, and supplies automobile manufacturers and component suppliers. In addition to development centres in Berlin, Chemnitz and Gifhorn, IAV operates at sites in France, United Kingdom, Spain, Sweden, China, Japan, South Korea, Brazil and the United States.

Clients include the Volkswagen Group, BMW, Stellantis, Ford, GM, Porsche, Toyota, Claas and Liebherr. Component manufacturer clients include Bosch, Aptiv, Continental, ZF Group, ETAS, Forvia, Freudenberg, Glatt, MWM, Schaeffler and Sonplas.

== Shareholders ==
As of 2023 the shareholders of IAV GmbH were:

- Volkswagen AG - 50%
- IAV GmbH - 20%
- Continental Automotive GmbH - 10%
- Schaeffler Technologies AG & Co. KG - 10%
- Vitesco Technologies GmbH - 10%

== Subsidiaries ==
IAV has the following worldwide subsidiary companies:

Europe

- Consulting4Drive GmbH
- IAV Cars GmbH
- IAV Fahrzeugsicherheit GmbH & Co. KG
- IAV France SAS
- IAV Automotive Engineering AB (Sweden)
- IAV Poland Sp. z.o.o.
- SynSpace Group GmbH

Asia

- IAV Automotive Engineering (Shanghai) Co. Ltd.
- IAV Co., Ltd. (Japan)
- IAV Korea Co., Ltd.

North / South America

- IAV Automotive Engineering Inc. (USA)
- IAV do Brasil Ltda.

== In-road electric vehicle charger ==
In 2009 the company submitted a patent for an electric vehicle recharger that is built into the road. The technology would allow electric vehicles to be charged as they drive over roads embedded with a recessed wireless recharging strip, using electromagnetic induction.

== See also ==
- Ground-level power supply
