= Stellant Systems =

American electronics manufacturer

Stellant Systems Inc.
- Company type: Private
- Industry: Aerospace and defense
- Predecessor: Litton Industries' Electron Division (later L3 Electron Division); Hughes Microwave Tube Division (later Electron Dynamics Devices under Boeing, then Electron Technologies within L3); Anacom, Inc./Narda West
- Founded: 2021
- Successor: Stellant Systems Inc.
- Headquarters: 3100, Lomita Blvd, Torrance, California, U.S.
- Number of locations: 3
- Products: Traveling wave tubes, TWTAs, xenon ion propulsion systems
- Parent: Arlington Capital Partners
- Website: stellantsystems.com

Stellant Systems Inc. is a manufacturer of microwave devices for ground-based, airborne and satellite communications and radar. In October 2021, Stellant systems was formed from L3Harris Technologies' Electron Devices and Narda Microwave-West divisions when both were sold to Arlington Capital Partners, a Washington D.C.–based private equity firm. The company was initially formed from the former Electron Dynamics Division (EDD) of the Industrial Electronics Group of the Hughes Aircraft Company, and from Litton Industries' Electron Division, both of which were acquired by L-3 Communications Holdings, Inc. L-3 later merged with Harris Corporation in 2019 to form L3Harris Technologies which was followed shortly by both divisions' sale to Arlington in 2021. Stellant is known for their traveling-wave tubes (TWTs), traveling-wave tube amplifiers (TWTAs), microwave power modules (MPMs) and electronic power conditioners (EPCs) as well as xenon gas ion propulsion systems (XIPS). Since its inception, EDD has produced tens of thousands of TWTs. They are the only U.S. supplier of space-qualified TWTs and TWTAs.

== History ==
=== Microwave Tube Industry ===
In 1947, Varian Associates started the modern microwave tube industry and by 1958 there were some 30 U.S. companies involved with microwave tubes. Consolidations began during the mid-1960s and continued through the 1980s. Four California companies, Hughes, Litton, Varian and Teledyne emerged as the survivors. Varian became Communication Power Industries (CPI). Litton was acquired first by Northrop Grumman which continued operating the company as Litton and months later sold it to L-3 communications. Hughes was acquired by GM, Boeing and finally L-3.

=== Litton Industries ===
In 1932, Charlie Litton started his own company in Redwood City, California. By 1945 his company, known then as Litton Industries, had about 60 employees, about 20 of which were working on vacuum tubes. By 1948, the business had grown to be about half manufacturing equipment and half tubes. After receiving a contract for a magnetron designated the 4J52, as well as follow-on contracts, the company became a major competitor to Raytheon and very profitable. In 1953, Charlie Litton sold Litton Industries to Electro Dynamics Corporation, who renamed themselves to adopt the Litton Industries name. The original Litton Industries, now Litton Industries, Electron Tube Division, grew rapidly. In 1965, Litton Industries bought Sylvania's plant in Williamsport, Pennsylvania, and moved all magnetron production there. In 1975, Litton Industries bought MA-COM Tube Operations, and in 1993 bought Raytheon Microwave Power Tube Operations. During the 1990s, Litton developed tubes and became second source for most of the Hughes EDD's airborne radar tubes. In 2001, the company was purchased by Northrop Grumman, becoming Litton Electron Devices. A short time later in 2002, Northrop sold Litton to L-3 Communications, who renamed it L-3 Electron Devices.

=== Hughes Microwave Tube Division ===
In the early 1950s, Hughes secured a military contract for the XF-108 Rapier interceptor's AN/ASG-18 fire control system and radar. At the end of the Korean War, the F-108 program was canceled, but Howard Hughes chose to keep the program going on company money. By 1959 Hughes Microwave Tube Division was operating in Culver City, California. Hughes was developing TWTs suitable for airborne radar, and eventually won the contract for the F-14 radar system. By the time the F-14 program went into production, the tube division had outgrown the Culver City facility. Hughes moved the operation to Torrance, California, in 1967, and it became Electron Dynamics Division (EDD) within the Industrial Electronics Group.

General Motors purchased Hughes Aircraft Company in 1985. The Boeing Company purchased GM's satellite operation in 2000, acquiring EDD in the process, and renamed it Boeing Satellite Systems, Electron Dynamic Devices, again maintaining the initials EDD. Boeing sold EDD to L-3 Communications, Inc. in 2005. L3 already owned another company using the initials EDD, thereby prompting a name change to L-3 communications, Electron Technologies, Inc. or ETI for short. Boeing sold the property in Torrance to RREEF America REIT III Corporation (RREEF) in October 2006.

=== Narda Microwave-West ===
Narda, a firm which specialized in the RF and Microwave Product industries, was formed in 1953 in Mineola, New York. It was initially named Nassau Research & Development Associates and was made up of three engineers, Bill Bourke, Jim McFarland, Stu Casper, and a writer and businessman, John McGregor. The following year, they changed the name to The Narda Corp, which was changed to The Narda Microwave Corp in 1957. In 1975, Narda acquired Anacom, Inc. which formed Narda's Pacific Operations, later to become Narda West. Narda was acquired by the Loral Corporation in 1983, which was itself acquired by Lockheed in 1994. In 1997, Narda was one of the ten companies spun off from Lockheed Martin to form L3 Communications, which would later become L3 Technologies.

=== L3 Electron Devices (L3 Technologies and L3Harris Technologies) ===
Both L3 Electron Devices and L3 Electron Technologies, Inc. existed under L3's umbrella before they were combined in 2017 under L3 Electron Devices. Narda East and Narda West both continued on within L3 Technologies as well, though Narda Microwaves-East was combined with MITEQ, Inc., a firm L3 acquired in 2015, to form Narda-MITEQ. Shortly thereafter, L3 Technologies and Harris Corporation merged in 2019 to form L3Harris Technologies.

=== Stellant Systems Inc. ===
Stellant Systems Inc. came into being when L3Harris Technologies sold the Electron Devices and Narda Microwave-West divisions to Arlington Capital Partners, a private equity firm, in early October 2021. Under this agreement, Electron Devices and Narda Microwave-West would combine to form Stellant Systems Inc. and become a subsidiary of Arlington's. Stellant reportedly was to maintain its independence and would be headed by leaders from within the two companies' ranks. Going forward, Stellant would retain its three facilities in Torrance, California, Williamsport, Pennsylvania, and Folsom, California.
