= Bausch + Ströbel =

German pharmaceutical manufacturing company

Bausch + Ströbel Maschinenfabrik Ilshofen GmbH + Co. KG
- Company type: Private company
- Industry: Pharmaceuticals
- Founded: 1967
- Headquarters: Ilshofen, Germany
- Key people: Markus Ströbel Thorsten Bullinger Hagen Gehringer Bernhard Frisch
- Services: Equipment manufacturing
- Revenue: EUR 175 million
- Number of employees: 1400
- Website: bausch-stroebel.com/en

The Bausch + Ströbel Maschinenfabrik Ilshofen GmbH + Co. KG is a pharmaceutical equipment manufacturing company with headquarters in Ilshofen Germany.

The machines are used to clean, sterilize, fill, and label pharmaceutical items such as medicine bottles, ampoules, syringes, cartridges, and injection vials.

== History ==
The company was founded in 1967 in Ilshofen. The company started with four employees who built filling and closing machines. The first subsidiary abroad was founded in Japan in 1975, and other companies worldwide followed.

Since 2007, following changes in the shareholder structure, the Bullinger and Ströbel families have owned the company. In December 2012, Wilco AG in Wohlen, Switzerland, was taken over, which enabled the product range to be expanded to include testing machines.

== Locations ==
In addition to Ilshofen, production takes place in Büchen, Germany.

In 2009 the assembly and storage area at the Ilshofen location was expanded, and in 2010 the technology building.

The company is represented in France, Japan, the Netherlands, Russia, and the US, with its own sales and service companies. Testing is done in Switzerland for facility testing acceptance.

== Partnerships ==
Since April 2011 Bausch + Stroebel belongs to the Alliance Excellence United a partnership of five leading technical families of specialized machinery for the pharmaceutical, medical technology, and process industries.

In addition to Bausch + Ströbel, the alliance also consists of Glatt, Fette Compacting, Harro Höfliger, and Uhlmann.
