= Janssen COVID-19 vaccine =

Vaccine against COVID-19

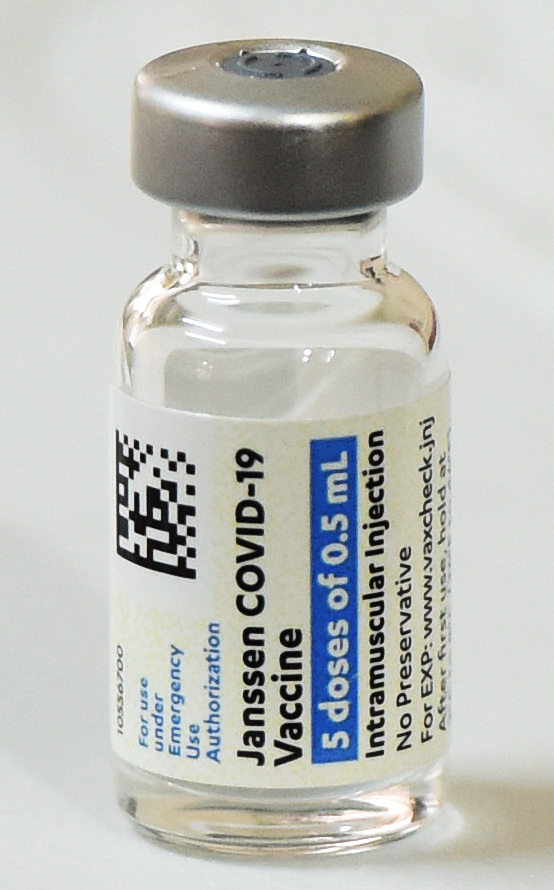
- A vial of Janssen COVID-19 Vaccine

Vaccine description
- Target: SARS-CoV-2
- Vaccine type: Viral vector

Clinical data
- Trade names: Jcovden
- Other names: Ad26.COV2.S; JNJ-78436735; Ad26COVS1; VAC31518; COVID-19 Vaccine Janssen; Johnson & Johnson COVID‑19 vaccine
- AHFS/Drugs.com: Multum Consumer Information
- License data: US DailyMed: Janssen COVID-19 Vaccine
- Pregnancy category: AU: B1
- Routes of administration: Intramuscular
- ATC code: J07BN02 (WHO)

Legal status
- Legal status: AU: S4 (Prescription only); BR: Approved; CA: ℞-only / Schedule D; UK: POM (Prescription only); US: Revoked emergency use authorization; EU: Rx-only / withdrawn; ZA: Authorized; Full list of Janssen vaccine authorizations

Identifiers
- CAS Number: 2541607-46-7
- DrugBank: DB15857
- UNII: JT2NS6183B
- KEGG: D12129

The Janssen COVID‑19 vaccine, (Ad26.COV2.S) sold under the brand name Jcovden, is a COVID‑19 vaccine that was developed by Janssen Vaccines in Leiden, Netherlands, and its Belgian parent company Janssen Pharmaceuticals, a subsidiary of American company Johnson & Johnson.

It is a viral vector vaccine based on a human adenovirus that has been modified to contain the gene for making the spike protein of the SARS-CoV-2 virus that causes COVID‑19. The body's immune system responds to this spike protein to produce antibodies. The vaccine requires only one dose and does not need to be stored frozen.

Clinical trials for the vaccine were started in June 2020, with phase III involving around 43,000 people. In January 2021, Janssen announced that 28 days after a completed vaccination, the vaccine was 66% effective in a one-dose regimen in preventing symptomatic COVID‑19, with an 85% efficacy in preventing severe COVID‑19 and 100% efficacy in preventing hospitalization or death caused by the disease.

The vaccine has been granted an emergency use authorization (EUA) by the US Food and Drug Administration (FDA) and a conditional marketing authorization by the European Medicines Agency (EMA) and the UK Medicines and Healthcare products Regulatory Agency. In June 2023, the FDA revoked the emergency use authorization for the Janssen COVID-19 vaccine at the request of its manufacturer.

Because cases of thrombosis with thrombocytopenia syndrome and Guillain-Barré syndrome have been reported after receipt of the Janssen COVID‑19 vaccine, the US Centers for Disease Control and Prevention (CDC) recommends "preferential use of mRNA COVID‑19 vaccines over the Janssen COVID‑19 vaccine, including both primary and booster doses administered to prevent COVID‑19, for all persons aged 18 years of age and older. The Janssen COVID‑19 vaccine may be considered in some situations, including for persons with a contraindication to receipt of mRNA COVID‑19 vaccines." In February 2022, Johnson & Johnson announced it has temporarily suspended production of the vaccine though they also noted that it will likely resume at some point in the future and that it will honor all pre-existing contracts that oblige Janssen to supply its vaccine by using the millions of already existing vaccine doses in its inventory where requested.

== Medical uses ==
The Janssen COVID‑19 vaccine is used to provide protection against infection by the SARS-CoV-2 virus in order to prevent COVID‑19 in people aged eighteen years and older.

The vaccine is given by intramuscular injection into the deltoid muscle. The initial course consists of a single dose.

There is no evidence that a second booster dose is needed to prevent severe disease in healthy adults. In October 2021, the US Centers for Disease Control and Prevention (CDC) began recommending a booster dose.

=== Efficacy ===
A vaccine is generally considered effective if the estimate is ≥50% with a >30% lower limit of the 95% confidence interval. Efficacy is closely related to effectiveness, which is generally expected to slowly decrease over time.

Efficacy by variant (Note: 21 September 2020 to 22 January 2021 in the United States, South Africa and Brazil.)
Severity of illness	Delta	Alpha	Beta	Lineage B.1 (Note: Wuhan-H1 variant D614G. Corresponds to 96% of the strains the United States during the study.)
Asymptomatic	Not reported	74% (65–82%) (Note: Effectiveness from a study with 97,787 participants from 27 February to 22 July 22, 2021 in the United States.)	Not reported	Not reported
Moderate (Note: Generally includes mild symptoms such as olfactory or taste disorders and moderate symptoms such as pneumonia.) to severe (Note: Generally understood as requiring some form of hospitalization (from supplemental oxygen therapy to ICU admission). The same statistical variable includes cases of death.)	Not reported	Not reported	64% (41–79%)	72% (58–82%)
Severe to critical	71% (Note: A confidence interval was not provided, so it is not possible to know the accuracy of this measurement.) (Note: Effectiveness against hospitalization from a preliminary study with 477,000 healthcare workers.)	Not reported	82% (46–95%)	86% (−9 to 100%)

In October 2021, Janssen reported at a meeting of the US Food and Drug Administration Vaccines and Related Biological Products Advisory Committee (VRBPAC) that a single dose produced durable protection against severe disease and hospitalization for at least 6 months in the United States, even when Delta emerged, but also a global decrease in protection against moderate disease attributed to emerging variants outside the US. Janssen also reported that a booster dose given 2 months after the primary dose increased efficacy against symptomatic disease to 75% (95% CI, 55–87%) globally and to 94% (59–100%) in the US and that it also increased efficacy against severe disease to nearly 100% (33–100%) globally.

== Pharmacology ==
The vaccine consists of a replication-incompetent recombinant adenovirus type 26 (Ad26) viral vector expressing the severe acute respiratory syndrome coronavirus 2 (SARS-CoV-2) spike (S) protein in a stabilized conformation. The PER.C6 cell line derived from human embryonic retinal cells is used in the production (replication) of the Ad26 adenovirus vector. It is similar to the approach used by the Oxford–AstraZeneca COVID-19 vaccine and the Russian Sputnik V COVID-19 vaccine which use human embryonic kidney (HEK) 293 cells for adenovirus vector replication.

The Ad26 viral vector lacks the E1 gene required for replication. Therefore, it cannot replicate in the human organism.

== Chemistry ==
The vaccine contains the following excipients: citric acid monohydrate, trisodium citrate dihydrate, ethanol (alcohol), 2-hydroxypropyl-β-cyclodextrin (HBCD) (hydroxypropyl betadex), polysorbate 80, sodium chloride, sodium hydroxide, and hydrochloric acid.

== Manufacturing ==
Unpunctured vials may be stored between 9 and 25 °C (48 and 77 °F) for up to twelve hours, and the vaccine can remain viable for months in a standard refrigerator. It is not shipped or stored frozen.

In April 2020, Johnson & Johnson entered a partnership with Catalent to provide large-scale manufacturing of the Johnson & Johnson vaccine at Catalent's Bloomington, Indiana facility. In July 2020, the partnership was expanded to include Catalent's facility in Anagni, Italy.

In September 2020, Grand River Aseptic Manufacturing agreed with Johnson & Johnson to support the manufacture of the vaccine, including technology transfer and fill and finish manufacture, at its Grand Rapids, Michigan facility.

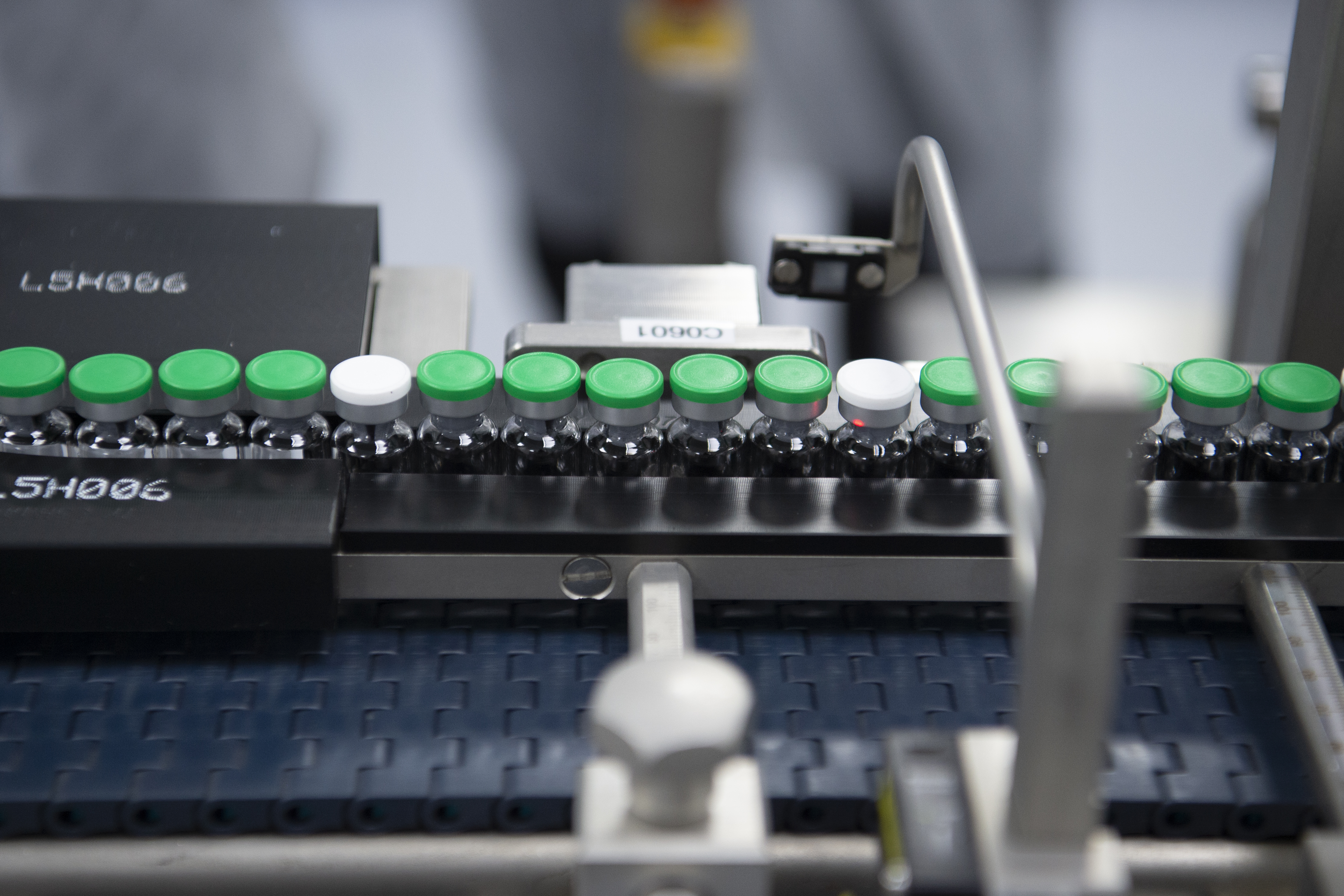
A production line at the Reig Jofre factory

In December 2020, Johnson & Johnson and Reig Jofre, a Spanish pharmaceutical company, entered into an agreement to manufacture the vaccine at Reig Jofre's Barcelona facility.

In February 2021, Sanofi and Johnson & Johnson struck a deal for Sanofi to provide support and infrastructure at Sanofi's Marcy-l'Étoile, France facility to manufacture approximately twelve million doses of the Johnson & Johnson vaccine per month once authorized.

In March 2021, Johnson & Johnson and Aspen Pharmacare made a deal to manufacture 220 million vaccines at Aspen's Gqeberha facility in Eastern Cape, South Africa. They plan to distribute the vaccine to other countries, mainly in Africa, and also through the COVID-19 Vaccines Global Access (COVAX) program.

In March 2021, Merck & Co and Johnson & Johnson struck a deal for Merck to manufacture the Johnson & Johnson vaccine at two facilities in the United States to help expand the manufacturing capacity of the vaccine using provisions of the Defense Production Act. That same month, human error at a plant run by Emergent BioSolutions in Baltimore resulted in the spoilage of up to fifteen million doses of the Johnson & Johnson vaccine. The error, which was caught before the doses left the plant, delayed expected shipments of the Johnson & Johnson vaccine within the United States. As the error had involved combining ingredients of the Johnson & Johnson vaccine with the AstraZeneca vaccine, the Biden administration gave control of the plant to Johnson & Johnson and said the plant should produce only the Johnson & Johnson vaccine to avoid further mix-ups. In July 2021, the FDA authorized Emergent to resume production (but not distribution) of the Janssen vaccine. 400 million doses were destroyed.

== Adverse effects ==
Review of Vaccine Adverse Events Reporting System (VAERS) safety monitoring data by the US Centers for Disease Control and Prevention (CDC) through 21 April 2021, (by which time 7.98 million doses of the Janssen COVID‑19 vaccine had been administered), showed that "97% of reported reactions after vaccine receipt were nonserious, consistent with preauthorization clinical trials data."

The most common side effects of the vaccine in the trials were usually mild or moderate, occurred within two days after vaccination, and got better within 1 or 2 days.

The most common side effects are pain at the injection site, headache, tiredness, muscle pain, and nausea, affecting more than 1 in 10 people. Coughing, joint pain, fever, chills, redness, and swelling at the injection site occurred in less than 1 in 10 people. Sneezing, tremor, throat pain, rash, sweating, muscle weakness, pain in the arms and legs, backache, weakness, and feeling generally unwell occurred in less than 1 in 100 people. Rare side effects (that occurred in less than 1 in 1,000 people) are hypersensitivity (allergy) and itchy rash.

An increased risk of the rare and potentially fatal thrombosis with thrombocytopenia syndrome (TTS) has been associated with mainly younger female recipients of the vaccine. This syndrome, marked by formation of blood clots in the blood vessels in combination with low levels of blood platelets 4–28 days after the vaccines administration, occurred at a rate of about 7 per 1 million vaccinated women aged 18–49 years old and it occurs more rarely in other populations (i.e., women 50 years and older and men of all ages).

Allergic reactions, including anaphylaxis, can occur in rare cases within a few minutes to one hour after receiving a dose.

In May 2021, with 7.98 million doses administered, the CDC reported four cases of anaphylaxis after vaccination (none of which resulted in death) and 28 cases of cerebral venous sinus thrombosis (of which three resulted in death).

In July 2021, the US fact sheet for the vaccine was updated to indicate that there may be an increased risk of Guillain-Barré syndrome during the 42 days following vaccination. The European Medicines Agency (EMA) listed Guillain-Barré syndrome (GBS) as a very rare side effect of COVID‑19 Vaccine Janssen and added a warning in the product information.

In August 2021, the Pharmacovigilance Risk Assessment Committee (PRAC) recommended updating the product information to the European Medicines Agency (EMA) that "cases of dizziness and tinnitus (ringing or other noises in one or both ears) are linked to the administration of COVID‑19 vaccine Janssen." Tinnitus was later labeled as "very rare" in a final safety study by the manufacturer.

In December 2021, the CDC accepted the recommendation from a panel of experts for a preference of using the Pfizer-BioNTech and Moderna vaccines over the Janssen vaccine due to rare but serious blood clotting events. In May 2022, the FDA limited the use of the Janssen vaccine to those over eighteen unable to access other vaccines or who are otherwise "medically ineligible" for other vaccine options.

== History ==
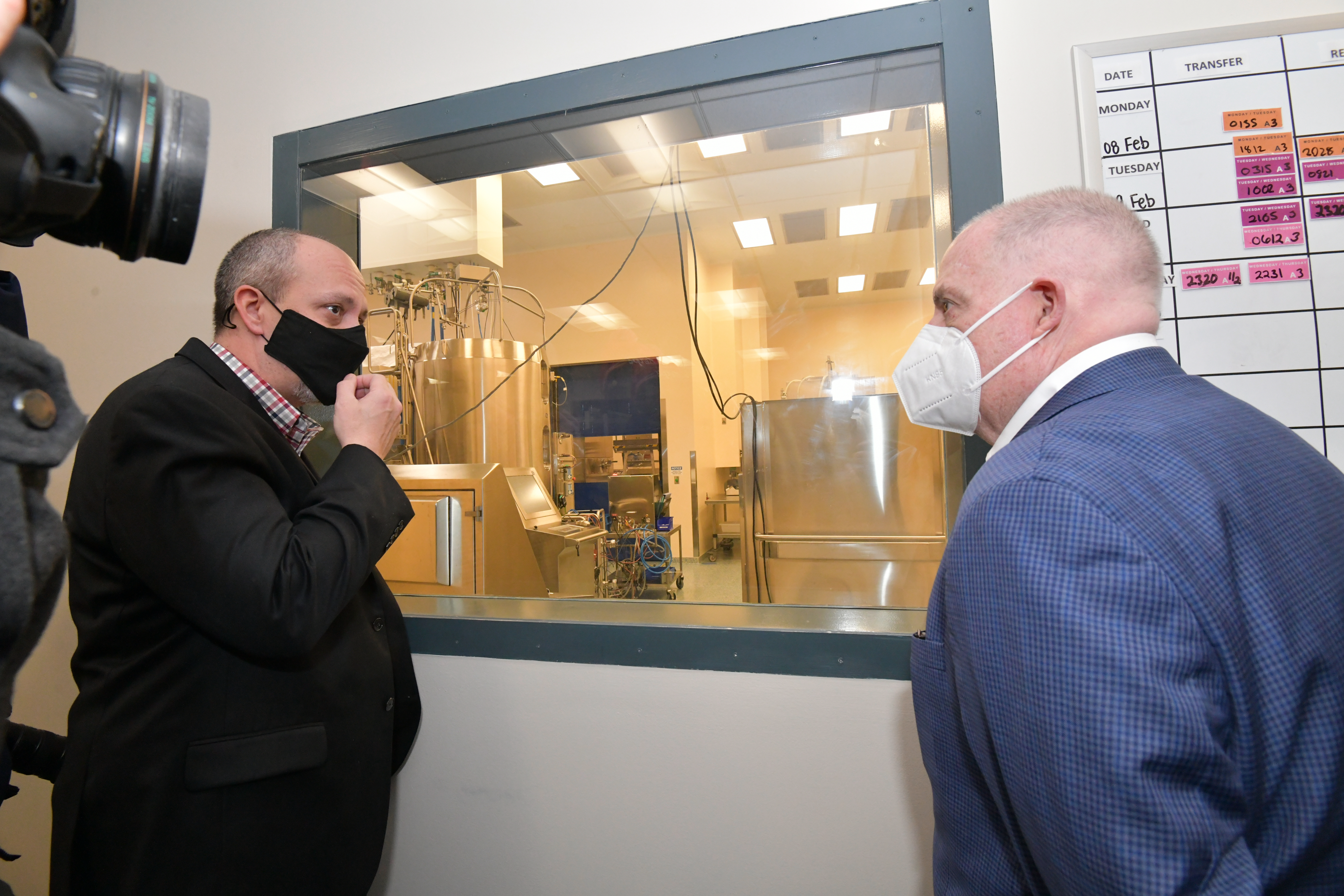
Inside an Emergent BioSolutions facility where, in collaboration with Johnson & Johnson, vaccines are produced

The stabilized version of the spike protein – that includes two mutations in which the regular amino acids are replaced with prolines – was developed by researchers at the National Institute of Allergy and Infectious Diseases' Vaccine Research Center and the University of Texas at Austin.

During the COVID‑19 pandemic, Johnson & Johnson committed over US$1 billion toward development of a not-for-profit vaccine in partnership with the Biomedical Advanced Research and Development Authority (BARDA) Office of the Assistant Secretary for Preparedness and Response (ASPR) at the U.S. Department of Health and Human Services (HHS). Johnson & Johnson said its vaccine project would be "at a not-for-profit level" as the company viewed it as "the fastest and the best way to find all the collaborations in the world to make this happen". In November, Johnson & Johnson announced that Janssen would commit about $604 million and BARDA would commit $454 million to fund the ENSEMBLE trial.

Johnson & Johnson subsidiary Janssen Vaccines, in partnership with Beth Israel Deaconess Medical Center (BIDMC), was responsible for developing the vaccine candidate, based on the same technology used to make its Ebola vaccine.

=== Clinical trials ===
Preclinical trials indicated that the vaccine effectively protected hamsters and rhesus macaques from SARS‐CoV‐2.

==== Phase I–II ====
In June 2020, Johnson & Johnson and the National Institute of Allergy and Infectious Diseases (NIAID) confirmed that they planned to start clinical trials of the Ad26.COV2.S vaccine in September 2020, with the possibility of phase I–IIa human clinical trials starting at an accelerated pace in the second half of July.

A phase I–IIa clinical trial started with the recruitment of the first subject in July 2020 and enrolled study participants in Belgium and the US. Interim results from the phase I–IIa trial established the safety, reactogenicity, and immunogenicity of Ad26.COV2.S. With one dose, after 29 days, the vaccine ensured ninety percent of participants had enough antibodies required to neutralize the virus. After 57 days, that number reached one hundred percent. 1x10^{11} viral particles (high dose) provided an increase in the neutralizing-antibody titers compared to 5×10^{10} (low dose). After the second dose 56 days after the first dose among participants between the ages of 18 and 55 years, the incidence of grade 3 solicited systemic adverse events was much lower than that after the first immunization in both the low-dose and high-dose groups, a finding that contrasts with observations with respect to messenger RNA–based vaccines, for which the second dose has been associated with increased reactogenicity. A substudy with 20 participants found that humoral and cell-mediated immune responses, including cytotoxic T cells, lasted for at least 8 months.

==== Phase III ====
A phase III clinical trial called ENSEMBLE started enrollment in September 2020 and completed enrollment in December 2020. It was designed as a randomized, double-blind, placebo-controlled clinical trial intended to evaluate the safety and efficacy of a single-dose vaccine versus placebo in adults aged 18 years of age and older. Study participants received a single intramuscular injection of Ad26.COV2.S at a dose level of 5×10^{10} virus particles on day one. The trial was paused in October 2020, because a volunteer became ill, but the company said it found no evidence that the vaccine had caused the illness and announced in October 2020 that it would resume the trial. In January 2021, Janssen announced safety and efficacy data from an interim analysis of ENSEMBLE trial data, which demonstrated the vaccine was 66% effective at preventing the combined endpoints of moderate and severe COVID‑19 at 28 days post-vaccination among all volunteers. The interim analysis was based on 468 cases of symptomatic COVID‑19 among 43,783 adult volunteers in Argentina, Brazil, Chile, Colombia, Mexico, Peru, South Africa, and the United States. No deaths related to COVID‑19 were reported in the vaccine group, while five deaths in the placebo group were related to COVID‑19. During the trial, no anaphylaxis was observed in participants.

A second phase III clinical trial called ENSEMBLE 2 started enrollment in November 2020. ENSEMBLE 2 differed from ENSEMBLE in that its study participants received two intramuscular (IM) injections of Ad26.COV2.S, one on day 1 and the next on day 57. Early results indicated 85% efficacy against severe/critical disease. Plasma from 8 participants showed greater neutralization activity against the Delta variant than against Beta.

=== Authorizations ===
==== European Union ====
Beginning in December 2020, clinical trial of the vaccine candidate has been undergoing a "rolling review" process by the Committee for Medicinal Products for Human Use of the European Medicines Agency (EMA), a step to expedite EMA consideration of an expected conditional marketing authorization. In February 2021, Janssen applied to the EMA for conditional marketing authorization of the vaccine. The European Commission approved the COVID‑19 Vaccine Janssen in March 2021. In Finland, the Janssen vaccine is only offered for those aged 65 and over.

==== United States ====
Dr. Anthony Fauci answers questions on the vaccine in March 2021

In February 2021, Janssen Biotech applied to the US Food and Drug Administration (FDA) for an emergency use authorization (EUA), and the FDA announced that its Vaccines and Related Biological Products Advisory Committee (VRBPAC) would meet in February to consider the application. In February, ahead of the VRBPAC meeting, briefing documents from Janssen and the FDA were issued; the FDA document recommends granting the EUA, concluding that the results of the clinical trials and the safety data are consistent with FDA EUA guidance for COVID‑19 vaccines. At the 26 February meeting, VRBPAC voted unanimously (22–0) to recommend that an EUA for the vaccine be issued. The FDA granted the EUA for the vaccine the following day. In February, the Advisory Committee on Immunization Practices (ACIP) of the Centers for Disease Control and Prevention (CDC) recommended the use of the vaccine for those aged 18 and older.

In April 2021, the CDC and the FDA issued a joint statement recommending that use of the Janssen vaccine be suspended, due to reports of six cases of cerebral venous sinus thrombosis—a "rare and severe" blood clot—in combination with low levels of blood platelets (thrombocytopenia), in six women between the ages of 18 and 48 who had received the vaccine. The symptoms occurred 6–13 days after they had received the vaccination, and it was reported that one woman had died and a second woman had been hospitalized in critical condition.

In April, the FDA and the CDC determined that the recommended pause regarding the use of the Janssen COVID‑19 Vaccine in the US should be lifted and use of the vaccine should resume. The EUA and the fact sheets were updated to reflect the risks of thrombosis-thrombocytopenia syndrome (TTS).

The FDA granted an emergency use authorization and the CDC issued a standing order for the use of the vaccine. In June 2023, the FDA revoked the emergency use authorization for the Janssen COVID-19 vaccine at the request of its manufacturer.

==== Elsewhere ====
In February 2021, Saint Vincent and the Grenadines issued an emergency authorization for the Janssen COVID‑19 vaccine, as well as the Moderna COVID‑19 vaccine, the Pfizer–BioNTech vaccine, the Gam-COVID-Vac vaccine (Sputnik V), and the Oxford–AstraZeneca vaccine.

In December 2020, Johnson & Johnson entered into an agreement in principle with the GAVI vaccine alliance to support the COVAX Facility. In February 2021, Johnson & Johnson submitted its formal request and data package to the World Health Organization for an Emergency Use Listing (EUL); an EUL is a requirement for participation in COVAX. Johnson & Johnson anticipated providing up to five hundred million doses through 2022 for COVAX. The World Health Organization issued an EUL for the Janssen COVID‑19 vaccine Ad26.COV2.S vaccine in March 2021.

In February 2021, the vaccine received emergency authorization in South Africa. In April 2021, South Africa suspended its rollout of the vaccine. The program resumed in April 2021.

In February 2021, Bahrain authorized the vaccine for emergency use.

In February 2021, the South Korean Ministry of Food and Drug Safety began a review of Johnson & Johnson's application for approval of its vaccine.

In late November 2020, Johnson & Johnson submitted a rolling review application to Health Canada for approval of its vaccine.

In March 2021, the vaccine received emergency authorization in Colombia.

In March 2021, the vaccine was authorized under interim order in Canada.

In April 2021, the Australian government stated that it would not be purchasing the Janssen vaccine, as it "does not intend to purchase any further adenovirus vaccines at this time". The Therapeutic Goods Administration granted provisional approval for use of the Janssen vaccine in Australia in June 2021.

In April 2021, the vaccine received emergency use authorization in the Philippines.

In May 2021, the vaccine received conditional marketing authorization in the United Kingdom.

In June 2021, the vaccine received emergency use authorization in Chile. The vaccine will be provided via COVAX.

In June 2021, Malaysia's National Pharmaceutical Regulatory Agency (NPRA) issued conditional registration for emergency use of the vaccine.

In June 2021, COVID‑19 Janssen Ad26.COV2.S was granted provisional approval in Australia.

In July 2021, the vaccine received provisional approval for use for people aged 18 and above in New Zealand.

In August 2021, Health and Family Welfare Minister of India announced that Johnson and Johnson single-dose vaccine was approved for emergency use in India through a supply agreement with homegrown vaccine maker Biological E. Limited.

In September 2021, National Agency of Drug and Food Control (BPOM) issued emergency use authorization in Indonesia.

In November 2021, the vaccine's authorization under interim order in Canada was transitioned to approval for use under the country's Food and Drug Regulations.

In August 2023, the COVID-19 Vaccine Janssen was removed from the Australian Register of Therapeutic Goods at the request of Janssen-Cilag Pty Ltd. The vaccine was never supplied in Australia.

=== Further development ===
==== Homologous prime-boost vaccination ====
In October 2021, the FDA and the CDC authorized the use of either homologous or heterologous vaccine booster doses.

==== Heterologous prime-boost vaccination ====
In October 2021, the US Food and Drug Administration (FDA) and the Centers for Disease Control and Prevention (CDC) authorized the use of either homologous or heterologous vaccine booster doses. The authorization was expanded to include all adults in November 2021.

== Society and culture ==
About 19.4 million doses of the Janssen COVID-19 vaccine were administered in the EU/EEA from authorization to 26 June 2022.

=== Economics ===
Given the Janssen vaccine is a single dose and has a lower cost, it was expected to play an important role in low and middle-income countries. Since it is a single dose vaccine, it has been a popular vaccine to distribute to the homeless, the incarcerated, and refugee populations. This is due to the fact that it is difficult for these aforementioned demographics to be contacted for vaccines that require a second dose. With lower costs and lower requirements of storage and distribution in comparison to the COVID‑19 vaccines by Pfizer and Moderna, the Janssen vaccine is more easily transported, stored, and administered. South African health minister Zweli Mkhize announced on 9 February 2021 that the country would sell or swap its one million doses of AstraZeneca vaccine. Once it did so, South Africa began vaccination using the Janssen vaccine in February 2021, marking the vaccine's first use outside of a clinical trial.

In July 2020, Johnson & Johnson pledged to deliver up to three hundred million doses of its vaccine to the US, with one hundred million upfront and an option for twenty million more. The deal, worth more than $1 billion, is funded by the Biomedical Advanced Research and Development Authority (BARDA) and the U.S. Department of Defense. The deal was confirmed on 5 August.

In August 2020, Johnson & Johnson signed a contract with the US federal government for $1 billion, agreeing to deliver one hundred million doses of the vaccine to the US following the Food and Drug Administration (FDA) grant of approval or emergency use authorization (EUA) for the vaccine. Under its agreement with the US government, Johnson & Johnson was targeted to produce twelve million doses by the end of February 2021, more than sixty million doses by the end of April 2021, and more than one hundred million doses by the end of June 2021. However, in January 2021, Johnson & Johnson acknowledged manufacturing delays would likely prevent it from meeting its contract of twelve million doses delivered to the US by the end of February. In February 2021, through congressional testimony by a company executive, Johnson & Johnson indicated that the company could deliver twenty million doses to the US government by the end of March and one hundred million doses in the first half of 2021.

In February 2021, Johnson & Johnson announced that it planned to ship the vaccine immediately following authorization.

In March 2021, the Canadian government placed an order with Johnson & Johnson for ten million doses, with an option to purchase up to twenty-eight million more; on 5 March, the vaccine became the fourth to receive Health Canada approval.

Shipments of the vaccine were scheduled to start in the second half of April 2021, with a commitment to deliver at least two hundred million doses to the EU in 2021.

The European distribution of the vaccine was slightly delayed until the EMA decided that rare cases of vaccine-induced blood clots did not outweigh the benefits of helping to fight the COVID‑19 pandemic.

=== Controversies ===
The United States Conference of Catholic Bishops expressed concern about the vaccine because the cell line Per.C6, which is used in development and production, was originally derived from the retinal tissue of an 18-week-old fetus electively aborted in 1985. Although the use of fetal tissue in vaccine development has become common since the 1930s, especially with cell-based vaccines, there are currently alternatives that do not carry the same potential ethical concerns as the Janssen vaccine. Some bioethicists dismiss that ethical concerns to using cells derived from ethically compromised sources should be addressed or alternatives sought. Others advance the view that the cells used for COVID‑19 vaccines are thousands of generations removed from their source material and do not contain any fetal tissue.

In December 2020, the Vatican published a note approved by Pope Francis, stating that "... all [COVID-19] vaccinations recognized as clinically safe and effective can be used in good conscience ..." However, the key objection to using these vaccines remains.

In September 2021, after criticism that doses of its single-shot COVID‑19 vaccine produced in Aspen Pharmacare's facility in South Africa were being exported to Europe, millions of doses that had been shipped to Europe and stored in warehouses will be returned to Africa, and newly manufactured doses will be shipped to African countries.

==== Misinformation ====
Videos on video-sharing platforms circulated around May 2021 showing people having magnets stick to their arms after receiving the vaccine, purportedly demonstrating the conspiracy theory that vaccines contain microchips, but these videos have been debunked.
