= Arlington Capital Partners =

Private equity firm

- Company type: Private
- Industry: Private equity
- Founded: 1999; 27 years ago
- Headquarters: Washington, DC, U.S.
- Products: Leveraged buyout, Growth capital
- Total assets: Approximately $14.0 billion
- Number of employees: 35+
- Website: www.arlingtoncap.com

Arlington Capital Partners is a Washington, DC–based private equity firm focusing on leveraged buyout and recapitalization investments in middle market companies. Started in 1999, the firm has raised over $14.0 billion of committed capital out of seven investment funds.

Arlington Capital Partners invests three core sectors of aerospace and defense, government services & technology, and healthcare.

== History ==
The firm is currently led by Managing Partners Matt Altman, Michael Lustbader, Peter Manos and David Wodlinger. The firm was co-founded in 1999 by Raymond W. Smith, Paul G. Stern, Jeffrey H. Freed and Robert I. Knibb. Its first fund closed in 2000 after raising $450 million. The second fund closed in 2006 with $575 million raised, their third fund closed in 2011 with $415.5 million, their fourth fund closed in 2016 with $700 million, their fifth fund closed in 2019 with $1.7 billion raised, their sixth fund closed in 2023 with $3.8 billion raised, and their seventh fund closed in 2025 with $6.0 billion raised.

== Notable investments ==
Notable investments include:

- Avalign Technologies
- Advanced Health
- AdVenture Interactive
- AEgis
- Afton Scientific
- Apogen Technologies
- AVS Bio
- Cadence Aerospace
- Cambridge Major Laboratories
- CBSET
- Centauri
- Chandler May
- Compusearch Software Solutions
- Consolidated Precision Products
- Cordica Medical
- Endeavor Robotics
- Everest Clinical Research
- Exostar
- Grand River Aseptic Manufacturing
- GRVTY
- Integrated Data Services
- iRobot Defense Holdings, Inc.
- Keel
- MB Aerospace
- Merrill Technologies Group
- Micron Technologies
- Micropact
- Millstone Medical Outsourcing
- Neumo
- NLX Corporation
- Novetta Solutions
- Ontario Systems
- Octo Consulting
- Quantum Spatial
- Qarbon Aerospace
- Polaris Alpha
- Pond & Company
- Riverpoint
- Secor
- Signal Tree
- Stellant Systems
- Tex Tech
- TSI
- Tyto Athene
- Virgo Holdings
- Zemax

== Notable Exits ==
In 2024, Arlington Capital Partners sold J&J Worldwide Services, a provider of engineering services, base support operations and facilities maintenance for the U.S. federal government, to CBRE Group, Inc. for $800 million in cash. In 2025, Arlington Capital Partners sold BlueHalo, a defense technology company focused on national security to AV (NASDAQ: AVAV). The transaction was announced in 2024 and was intended to advance AV's position as a global defense technology leader with integrated capabilities across air, land, sea, space, and cyber.

== Notable Awards ==
In 2025, Arlington Capital Partners was named as one of the top 20 global mid-market buyout firms in the HEC Paris-Dow Jones Mid-Market Buyout Performance Ranking. The ranking, compiled by HEC Paris Business School in conjunction with Dow Jones, evaluated the aggregate performance of buyout funds raised between 2011 and 2020 and placed Arlington among the top 20 firms worldwide for its performance in the mid-market segment.
