= Glatt group =

International Health Care Conglomerate

Glatt
- Company type: Limited liability company (Gesellschaft mit beschränkter Haftung)
- Industry: machine and plant manufacturing, process engineering
- Founded: 1954
- Headquarters: Binzen, Germany
- Key people: Reinhard Nowak (president)
- Products: fluid bed units, pan coaters, high shear mixers, product handling, engineering and other services
- Revenue: 318,2 Mio. € (2010)
- Number of employees: 2,300 (2023)
- Website: www.glatt.com

The Glatt group is active internationally as an equipment manufacturer, system supplier and engineering service provider in the field of processing and refinement of solid compounds for the food / feed, pharmaceutical and fine chemical industry.

== History ==
Founded in 1954 by Werner Glatt and initially dealing with oven flues and venting systems, the company experienced a rapid boom – thanks to good connections and the nearby pharmaceutical industry in Switzerland.

In 1959, Werner Glatt and a dozen employees designed and installed the very first fluid bed dryer used in the pharmaceutical industry worldwide.

Further developments evolved; after drying technology came granulation technology, then coating and finally pelletizing technology.

In the following years the Company compounded and strengthened its business operations : In 1971, Glatt AG was founded in Switzerland, followed in 1973 by Glatt Air Techniques (GAT) in Ramsey, USA; Glatt AG was instrumental in launching a second Glatt product family onto the market: the tablet pan coater. Within the course of just a few years, additional sales companies were established in other countries: Glatt Pharmatech in France, Glatt Protech in the UK, Glatt Ireland and Glatt Norden in Denmark.

In 1989, Reinhard Nowak took over as Chief Executive from company founder Werner Glatt.

1991 saw the foundation of Glatt Ingenieurtechnik (GIT) in Weimar, Germany. Almost simultaneously, Glatt Systemtechnik (GST) was also founded in Dresden, Germany. Both companies added major new product lines and services thereby complementing the existing Glatt portfolio.

Today, the Glatt Corporation is a global group of companies and employs a workforce of over 1400 at its various locations.

== Technologies ==
The core technology of the Glatt group of companies is the fluid bed technology for the drying, granulating, pelletizing (see also spheronization) and the coating of solid compounds. Glatt has shaped and constantly further developed this technology. Initially used solely as a dryer, the fluid bed unit has – by using suitable spraying systems – become a granulator and then – with the relevant developments – a particle coater. Today, fluid bed units are available for batch as well as for continuous production. Further technologies include wet granulation as well as film and sugar coating.

These technologies are applied:

- in the pharmaceutical industry for production of
  - Granules, tablets and dragées
  - Pellets, capsules
  - Ointments, creams
  - Suppositories
  - Blood plasma products
  - Vaccines
  - Infusions and injection solutions
  - Drops
  - Juices
- in the food / feed industry for production of
  - Flavours
  - Enzymes
  - Feed and feed additives
  - Baker's yeast and feed yeast
  - Instant products
  - Foods and food ingredients
  - Milk and dairy products
- in the fine chemical industry for production of
  - Enzymes
  - Fertilizers
  - Pesticides
  - Polymers
  - Detergent components

== Products and services ==
Glatt’s product range comprises batch- and continuous fluid bed units (for drying, granulating, particle coating, pelletizing), high shear mixers (for wet granulation), pan coaters (for film- and sugar coating) and equipment for product handling and containment. Services are provided in the field of engineering and turnkey projects, where the company plans and implements complete turnkey production facilities. Further services are provided by Glatt laboratories involved in product and formulation development as well as process development and optimization. With the Technology Training Center (TTC), Glatt also provides and independent platform for seminars and technical training.

== Companies ==
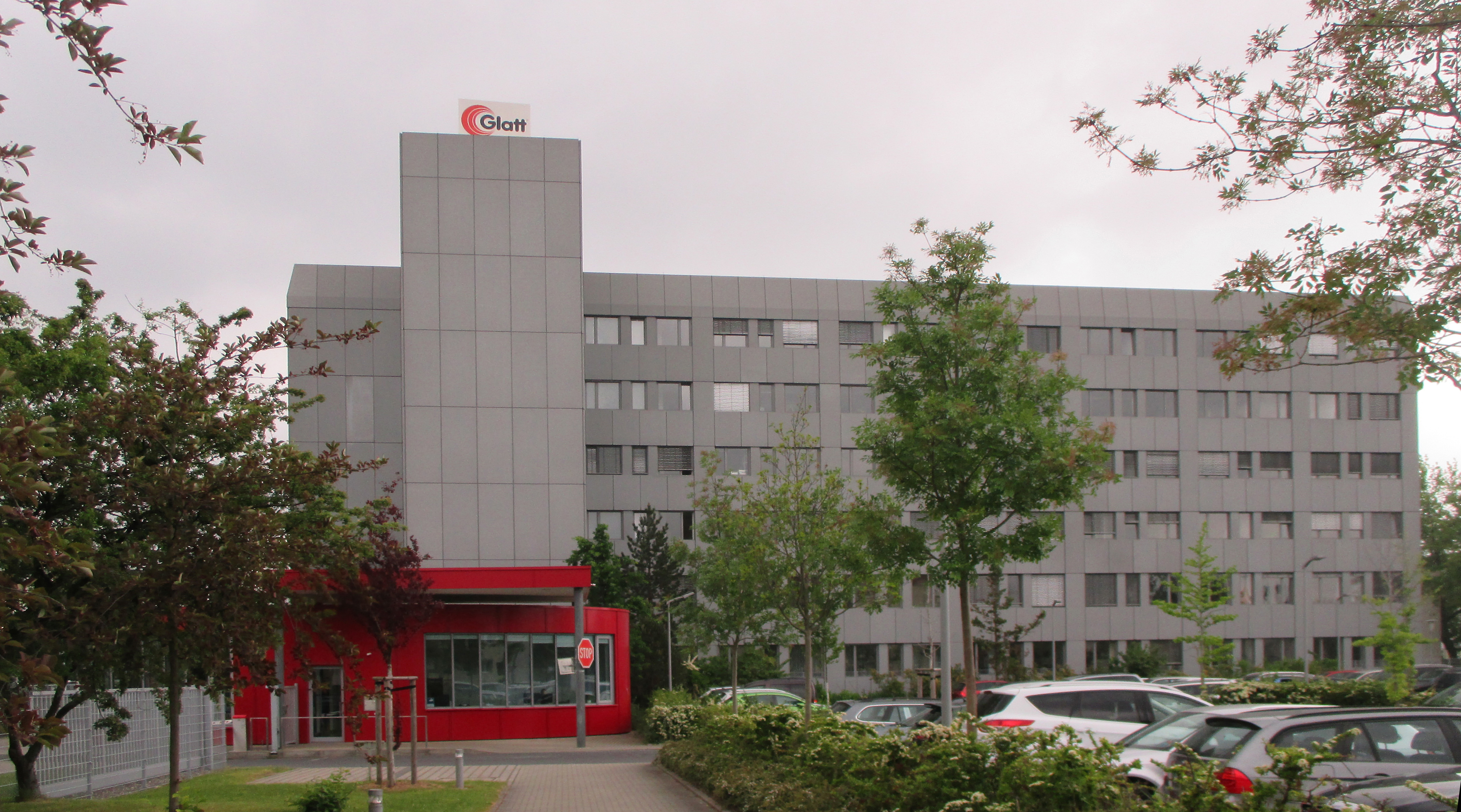
Glatt - Grunaer Weg - Dresden

The Glatt group of companies comprises:

- Glatt GmbH (Binzen / Germany)

Batch fluid bed-related equipment and services (specializing in: pharmaceuticals)

Contract manufacturing and development for the Pharmaceutical Industry

- Glatt Maschinen- & Apparatebau AG (Pratteln / Switzerland)

Pan coating-related equipment and services (specializing in: pharmaceuticals)

- Glatt Ingenieurtechnik GmbH (Weimar / Germany, Wiesbaden / Germany, Moskau / Russia, New Delhi / India)

Engineering, turnkey projects (specializing in: pharmaceuticals, food / feed, fine chemicals)
Continuous fluid bed-related equipment and services (specializing in: food / feed, fine chemicals)

- Glatt Systemtechnik GmbH (Dresden / Germany)

High shear mixing- and product handling-related equipment and services (specializing in: pharmaceuticals, food / feed, fine chemicals)

- Glatt Pharma s.r.o. (Hradec Kralove / Czech Republic)
- Glatt Air Techniques Inc. (Ramsey / USA)
- Glatt Protech Ltd. (Leicester / UK)
- Glatt Pharmatech SASU (Dijon / France) - Closed in June 2013
- Glatt Systems Private Limited- India 2012

And further companies and partners.

=== Partnership ===
The Glatt group of companies joined the alliance "Excellence United" in April 2011. Excellence United is a partnership between four leading technological family companies involved in specialist engineering for the pharmaceutical, medicine and process industry. Further members of the alliance are Fette Compacting, Harro Höfliger, and Uhlmann. Each of these companies is the market leader in their industry.

Glatt operates in India under Glatt systems Pvt Ltd.
