= Harro Höfliger Verpackungsmaschinen =

German company

Harro Höfliger Verpackungsmaschinen GmbH
- Company type: GmbH
- Industry: Mechanical and Plant Engineering
- Founded: 1975
- Headquarters: Allmersbach im Tal, Baden-Württemberg, Germany
- Key people: Thomas Weller; Uwe Amann; Peter Claußnitzer; Thomas Heckner; Alexander Herb; Markus Höfliger (chairman of the supervisory board)
- Revenue: €335 million (2023)
- Number of employees: 1,765
- Website: www.hoefliger.com/en

Harro Höfliger Verpackungsmaschinen GmbH, or simply Harro Höfliger, is a manufacturer of production and packaging equipment headquartered in Allmersbach im Tal in Baden-Württemberg, Germany.

== History ==
=== Beginnings ===
The trained machine fitter Harro Höfliger (1937–2019) started his own business in Stuttgart-Untertürkheim in 1975. In his backyard garage, he overhauled used cartoning machines for resale. From 1976, the company operated as Harro Höfliger Verpackungsmaschinen GmbH, based in Backnang. Parallel to trading in used equipment, the company began developing and manufacturing its own packaging machines. Marianne Höfliger took over the commercial management. In 1979, the company moved to Allmersbach im Tal. The first apprentice was hired in 1981. In 1983, Manfred Reiser joined the company as managing director of Engineering and a partner. The product range initially comprised mainly standard machines and packaging lines for the food and beverage industry, but in the following years developed increasingly towards customized production systems for the pharmaceutical industry.

=== 1990s ===
In 1990, for the first time, more systems were manufactured for the pharmaceutical sector than for the food sector. In addition to capsule filling and weighing machines, Höfliger also added web-processing machines for the production of transdermal patches and medical wound care products to its portfolio. In 1994, the first international branch was founded in Doylestown, Pennsylvania (USA).

=== 2000s ===
Until the early 2000s, the machine portfolio included modularly combinable components for customized production systems. In 2003, a laboratory for production-related analysis of inhalation powders was established, followed by the setup of a pharmaceutical development service in 2005. Furthermore, the company's own cleanrooms now make it possible to operate the production systems with active pharmaceutical ingredients under realistic environmental conditions.

Following the death of Marianne Höfliger in 2006, a restructuring took place. Thomas Weller, Markus Höfliger, and Peter Claußnitzer were appointed as managing directors. From 2008, Uwe Amann and Heinrich Havenstein joined the management. In 2012, the operating area in Allmersbach was expanded with a new building. Spanning around 7,000 square meters, it provided a new location for assembly and offices, as well as the test material storage and the training center.

=== 2010s ===
In 2013, company founder Harro Höfliger transferred his company shares to a family foundation and withdrew from day-to-day operations. In 2018, he assumed the chairmanship of the newly founded supervisory board. After his death in the spring of 2019, Markus Höfliger succeeded him in this position.

=== 2020s ===
On April 1, 2022, Harro Höfliger acquired Widmann Maschinen GmbH & Co. KG, based in Schlierbach. The company developed and built a series of special machines used for packaging food and cosmetics, in the automotive industry, and in medical technology.

In 2024, the Hungarian Manz Hungary Kft., a subsidiary of the German mechanical engineering company Manz AG based in Reutlingen, was acquired. In 2025, Harro Höfliger celebrated its 50th anniversary.

== Corporate structure ==
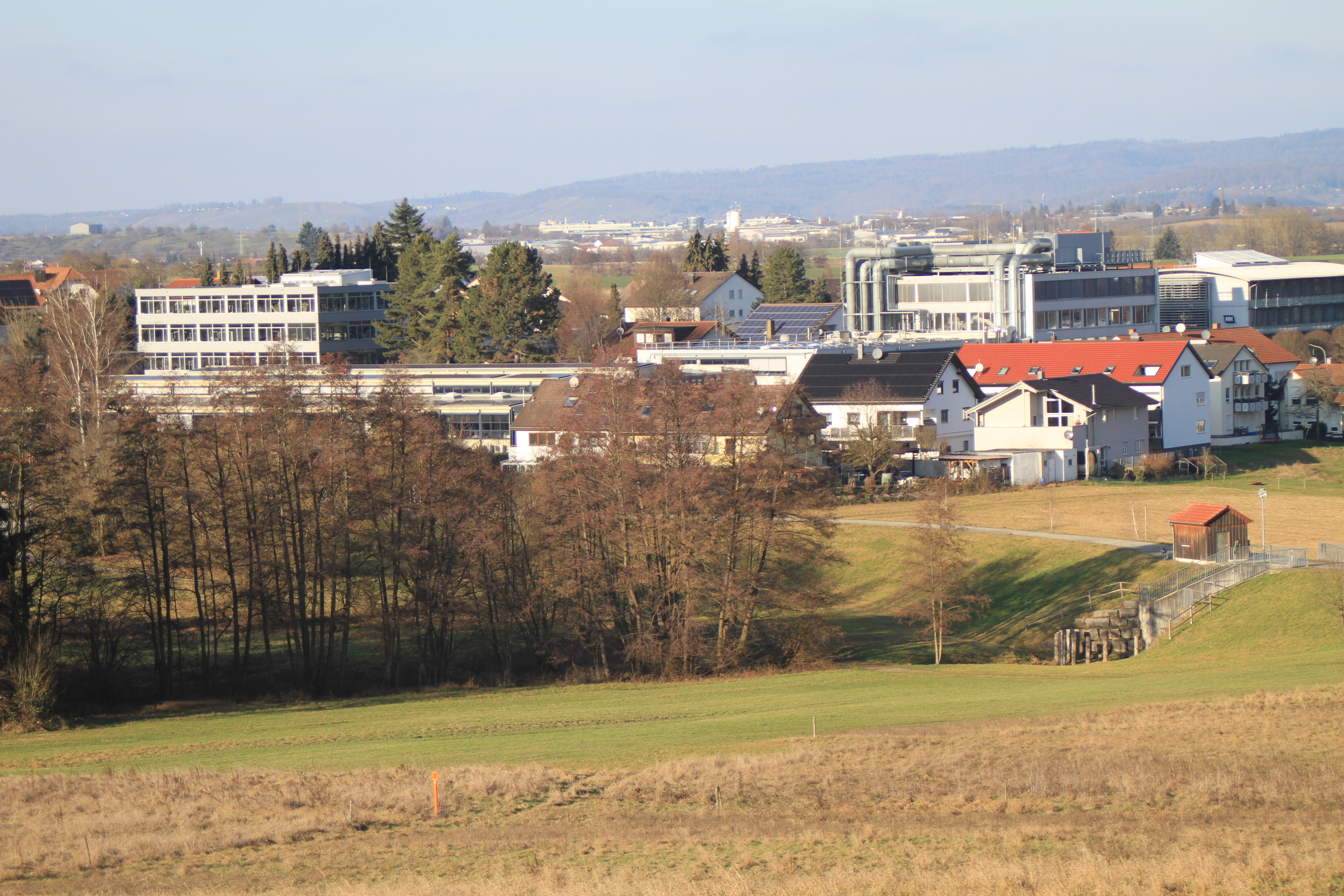
Harro Höfliger plant in Allmersbach im Tal

In 2023, Harro Höfliger employed 1,765 people and generated revenues of €335 million. Around 79% of the revenue was generated in the pharmaceutical and medical technology sectors, while about a fifth accounted for the chemical-technical industry. The food and beverage sector now only plays a minor role.

Several subsidiaries belong to Harro Höfliger Verpackungsmaschinen GmbH, including:

- Harro Hoefliger Packaging Systems Inc. (United States)
- Harro Höfliger AG (Switzerland)
- Harro Hofliger Packaging Systems Ltd. (United Kingdom)
- Harro Höfliger Nordic AB (Sweden)
- Harro Höfliger Hungary Kft. (Hungary)
- DS Technology GmbH (Allmersbach)

In addition to the headquarters in Allmersbach im Tal, there are locations in Backnang (Technology Center), Großaspach (Manufacturing and Logistics), Oppenweiler, Satteldorf, and Schlierbach. The company has branches in China, India, Scandinavia, Singapore, Switzerland, Hungary, the United Kingdom, and the USA, as well as over 30 representative offices.

== Products ==
The main sales markets for Harro Höfliger are primarily the medical technology and pharmaceutical industries, as well as manufacturers of home care products and the food industry. The product range extends from machines for research and laboratory use to systems for high-performance production, including turnkey solutions. The scope of supply also includes technologies for aseptic and containment applications.

Additionally, Harro Höfliger offers various services, including support in the development of processes and devices, technological assistance in product development, as well as qualification and validation services for machines and systems.

=== Pharmaceuticals and medical technology ===
In the pharmaceutical and medical technology sectors, Harro Höfliger develops and produces machines capable of manufacturing inhalers, syringes, dressing materials, contact lenses, medication capsules, autoinjectors, pens, catheters, IV bags, surgical sutures, and diagnostic systems.

=== Consumer goods ===
In the consumer goods sector, Harro Höfliger offers machines for dosing, filling, and packaging items such as laundry detergent or dishwasher tabs.
