= Wilco AG =

- Company type: Private Limited Company
- Industry: Mechanical engineering
- Founded: 1971
- Headquarters: Wohlen, Switzerland
- Key people: Management: Managing Director: Dr. Uwe Bräuning and Marco Samà
- Products: Leak Detection Equipment, Visual Inspection Equipment
- Services: Feasibility Studies, Method Development, Solution Design
- Number of employees: ~140 (July 2022)
- Website: www.wilco.com

Wilco AG is a company that produces equipment for the pharmaceutical, food, packaging, aerosol, and can-making industries. Its headquarters are in Wohlen (Switzerland). The machines are used for leak testing and automated visual inspection of containers, such as medicine bottles, vials, syringes, cartridges, ampoules, Blow-fill seal, IV-Bags, packaging, cans, and pouches.

== History ==
Wilco AG was founded in 1971 by Martin Lehmann. In 1983 the company moved into the building in Rigacker, expanded in 1994, again in 2003, and again in October 2010. Since January 2013, Wilco AG belongs to Bausch + Ströbel of Ilshofen in Germany.

== Business ==
The engineering, design and assembly of these machines is performed in a plant at Wohlen. The company is represented by over 30 representatives worldwide, and in the United States with a service company.

The company is the global market leader for leak detection machines and trendsetter for inspection with a new inspection approach from lab to production.
