= Wilco van Kleef =

Wilco van Kleef-Bolton
- Born: 16 February 1981 (age 45); Cuijk, The Netherlands
- Height: 210 cm (6 ft 11 in)
- Spouse: Keisha van Kleef-Bolton
- Children: Lucas, Eva, Jonah, Gabriel, Ezra

Wilco van Kleef-Bolton [formerly Wilco van Kleef] (born February 16, 1981) is a Dutch man who, together with his wife Keisha van Kleef-Bolton, is the current record holder of The Tallest Living Married Couple in the World title as certified by Guinness World Records.

Wilco lives in Dagenham, England with his wife and their five children.

== Records ==
The couple's combined height was recorded at 404.7 cm in their home in England by Guinness World Records, on March 18, 2009. They are the first record holders for the title of "Tallest Married Couple - Living". The couple met in 2001 when Keisha placed a message on the Tall Persons Club - GB & Ireland, requesting a dance partner. They were married on November 17, 2001.
