= Wilkos =

Wilkos is a surname. Notable people with the surname include:

- Rachelle Wilkos (born 1971), American television producer
- Steve Wilkos (born 1964), American television personality

== See also ==
- Wilko (disambiguation)
- Wilkes (surname)
- Wilks
