= Roller cone bit =

Type of drill bit

A roller-cone bit is a drill bit used for drilling through rock that features 2 or 3 abrasive, spinning cones that break up rock and sediment as they grind against it. Roller-cone bits are typically used when drilling for oil and gas. A water jet flowing through the bit washes out the rock in a slurry.

== History ==
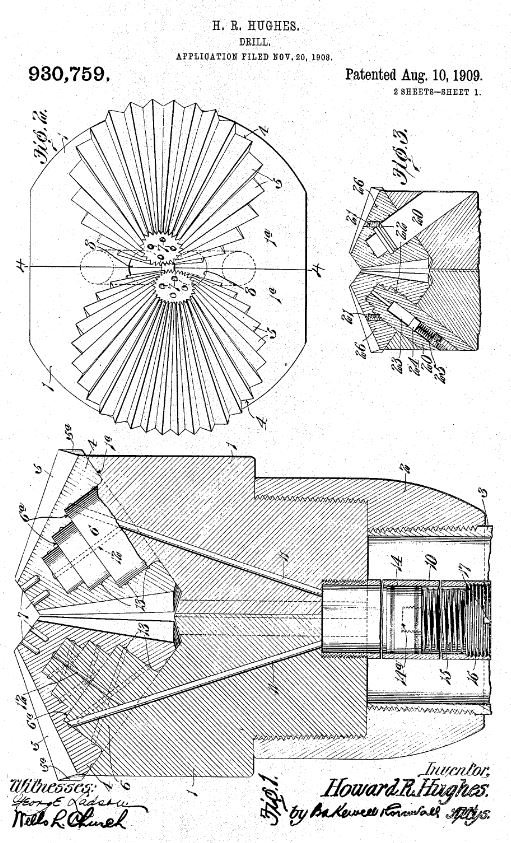
Hughes' original 1908 patent filing for the roller cone bit

The oil boom in the southern United States in the early 20th century lead to the need for higher efficiency drill bits for well boring. After the Spindletop Gusher, Howard R. Hughes Sr. recognized the growing demand for oil and the ineffectiveness of the standard fishtail bit against harder rock formations. The first roller cone patent was for the rotary rock bit and was issued to American businessman and inventor Howard Hughes Sr. in 1909. It consisted of two interlocking cones. American businessman Walter Benona Sharp worked very closely with Hughes in developing the rock bit. The success of this bit led to the founding of the Sharp-Hughes Tool Company. In 1933 two Hughes engineers, one of whom was Ralph Neuhaus, invented the tricone bit, which has three roller cones. The Hughes patent for the tricone bit lasted until 1951, after which other companies made similar bits. However, Hughes still held 40% of the world's drill bit market in 2000.

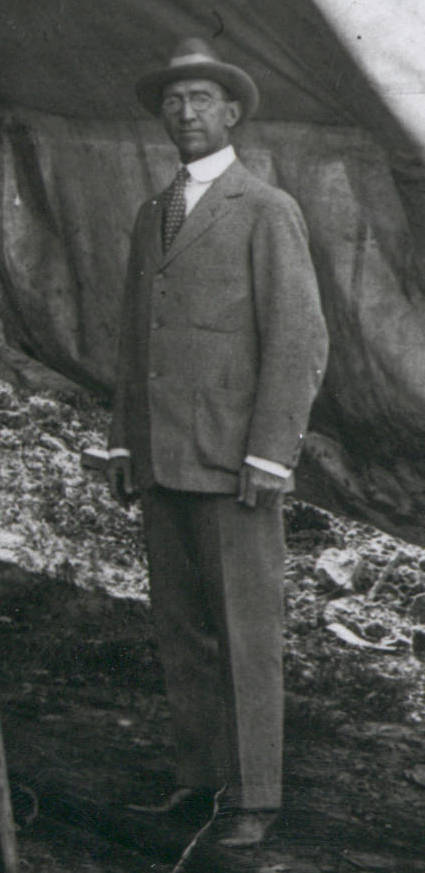
Howard Hughes Sr., designer of the first roller cone bit

== Design ==
Roller cone bits are characterized by the use of rolling cones at the head rather than the typical auger-type design of most drill bits. Rock hardness is one of the determining factors taken into account when selecting an appropriate drill bit. The cutting structure of the bits varies according to the rock formation. Softer formations are drilled with a roller-cone bit with widely spaced, long protruding teeth, whereas harder formations are drilled with closer-spaced and shorter-toothed bits. Roller-Cone bits are versatile and can cut through many formation types. Cones with machined heads are used in applications where tooth wear on the bit is negligible. These bits are usually machined from steel and have larger, more aggressive teeth. On the other hand, cones with tungsten inserts are used in high wear applications, where it is preferable to replace only the inserts and not the entire drill bit. They also tend to have smaller teeth.

Drilling bits are attachments that are added to the end of a drillstring to perform the cutting necessary to penetrate the many rock layers between Earth's surface and oil/gas reservoirs. Once a hole is drilled, appropriate casings may be inserted to seal the wellbore formation.

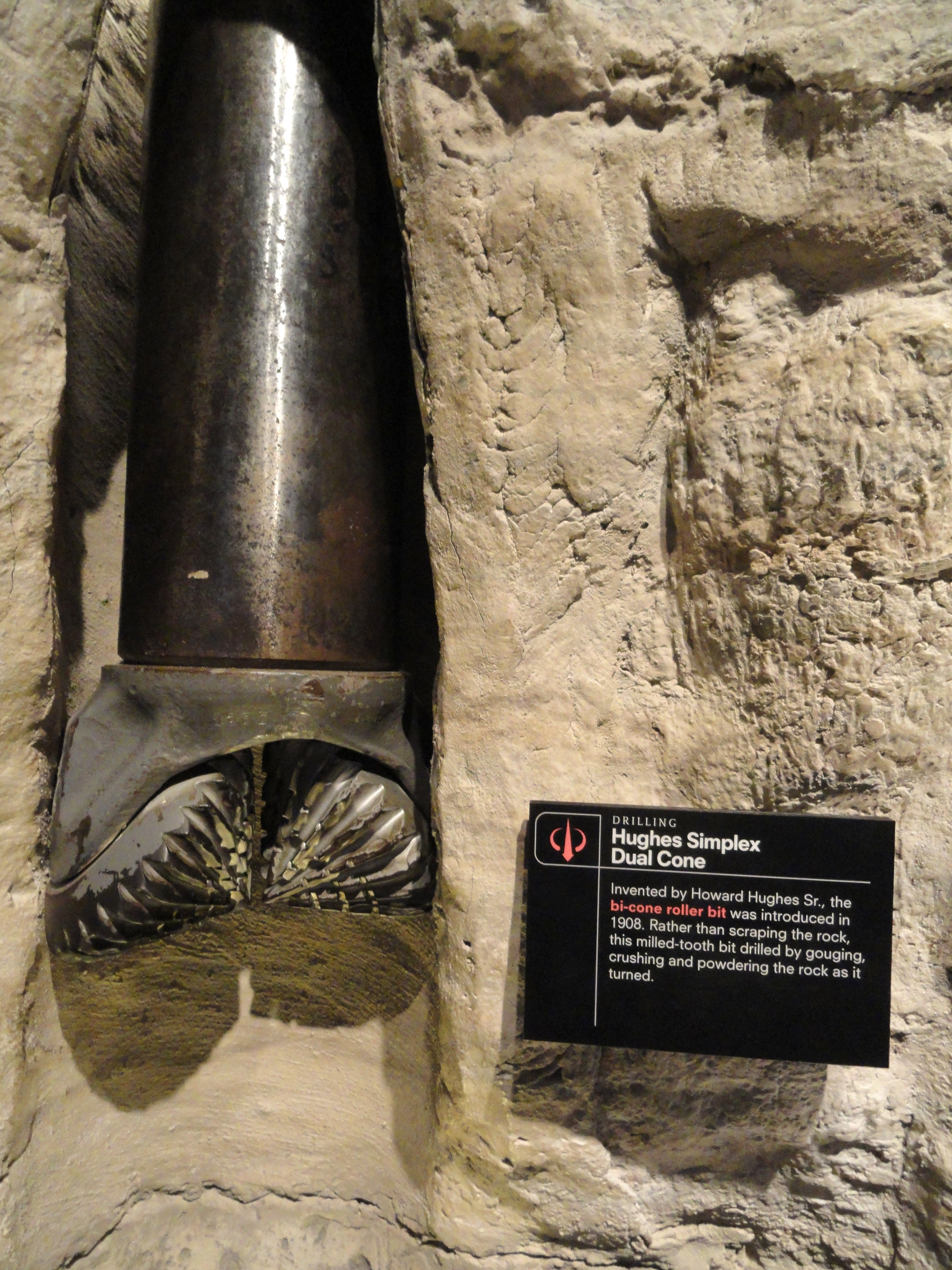
Original design Hughes Simplex Dual Cone drill bit

The bits are further classified based on their internal bearings. Each bit has three rotating cones and each one will rotate on its own axis during drilling. While the bits are fixed to the drilling rigs, the rotation of the drill pipe will be in a clockwise direction and the roller cones are rotated in a counter-clockwise direction. Each roller cone is rotated on its own axis with the help of the bearing. Again, the bearings are classified mainly into three types: Open bearing bits, Sealed Bearing Bits and Journal Bearing bits.
