= The Aviator (2004 film) =

Film by Martin Scorsese

- Theatrical release poster
- Directed by: Martin Scorsese
- Written by: John Logan
- Produced by: Michael Mann; Sandy Climan; Graham King; Charles Evans Jr.
- Starring: Leonardo DiCaprio; Cate Blanchett; Kate Beckinsale; John C. Reilly; Alec Baldwin; Alan Alda; Jude Law
- Cinematography: Robert Richardson
- Edited by: Thelma Schoonmaker
- Music by: Howard Shore
- Production companies: Miramax Films; Warner Bros. Pictures; Forward Pass; Appian Way; IMF; Initial Entertainment Group
- Distributed by: Miramax Films (United States); Buena Vista International (Germany)
- Release dates: December 17, 2004 (United States); January 19, 2005 (Germany)
- Running time: 170 minutes
- Countries: United States; Germany
- Language: English
- Budget: $110 million
- Box office: $214 million

The Aviator is a 2004 epic biographical drama film directed by Martin Scorsese and written by John Logan. It stars Leonardo DiCaprio as Howard Hughes, Cate Blanchett as Katharine Hepburn, and Kate Beckinsale as Ava Gardner. The supporting cast includes John C. Reilly, Alec Baldwin, Alan Alda and Jude Law.

The film depicts the life of Howard Hughes, an aviation pioneer and director of the film Hell's Angels (1930). The film portrays his life from 1927 to 1947, when Hughes became a successful film producer and an aviation magnate while simultaneously growing more unstable due to severe obsessive–compulsive disorder (OCD).

Filmed in Montreal, The Aviator was released in the United States on December 25, 2004, to positive reviews. It grossed $214 million on a budget of $110 million, thus emerging as a moderate commercial success at the box office.

The Aviator received a leading 11 nominations at the 77th Academy Awards, including Best Picture, Best Director (for Scorsese), Best Actor (for DiCaprio), and Best Supporting Actor (for Alda), and won a leading 5 awards, including Best Supporting Actress (for Blanchett). At the 58th British Academy Film Awards, it received a leading 14 nominations, including Best Director, Best Actor in a Leading Role (for DiCaprio) and Best Actor in a Supporting Role (for Alda), and won a leading 4 awards, including Best Film and Best Actress in a Supporting Role (for Blanchett). It received 6 nominations at the 62nd Golden Globe Awards, including Best Director and Best Supporting Actress – Motion Picture (for Blanchett), and won a leading 3 awards, including Best Motion Picture – Drama and Best Actor – Motion Picture Drama (for DiCaprio). The film also received 3 nominations at the 11th Screen Actors Guild Awards, including Outstanding Male Actor in a Leading Role (for DiCaprio), winning Outstanding Performance by a Female Actor in a Supporting Role (for Blanchett).

== Plot ==
In 1913 Houston, eight-year-old Howard Hughes's mother gives him a bath and teaches him to spell "quarantine", warning him about the recent cholera outbreak. Fourteen years later, in 1927, he begins to direct his film Hell's Angels, and hires Noah Dietrich to manage the day-to-day operations of his business empire.

After the release of The Jazz Singer (1927), the first partially talking film, Hughes becomes obsessed with shooting his film realistically, and decides to convert the movie to a sound film. Despite the film being a hit, Hughes remains unsatisfied with the result and orders it to be recut after its Hollywood premiere. He becomes romantically involved with actress Katharine Hepburn, who helps to ease the symptoms of his worsening obsessive–compulsive disorder (OCD) and germaphobia.

In 1935, Hughes test-flies the H-1 Racer, pushing it to a new speed record despite having to crash-land into a beet field when the aircraft runs out of fuel. Three years later, he flies around the world in four days, breaking the world record. He subsequently purchases majority interest in Transcontinental & Western Air (TWA).

Juan Trippe, company rival and chairman of Pan Am, asks his crony, Senator Ralph Owen Brewster, to introduce the Community Airline Bill, which would give Pan Am exclusivity on international air travel. Hepburn grows tired of Hughes's eccentricity and workaholism, and leaves him for fellow actor Spencer Tracy. Hughes quickly finds a new love interest with 15-year-old Faith Domergue, and later actress Ava Gardner. However, he still has feelings for Hepburn, and bribes a reporter to keep reports about her affair with the married Tracy out of the press.

In the mid-1940s, Hughes contracts two projects with the Army Air Forces, one for a spy aircraft, and another for a troop transport unit for use in World War II.

In 1946, with the H-4 Hercules flying boat still in construction, Hughes finishes the XF-11 reconnaissance aircraft and takes it for a test flight. However, one of the engines fails midflight; he crashes in Beverly Hills and is severely injured, but miraculously survives. The army cancels its order for the H-4 Hercules, although Hughes still continues the development with his own money. Dietrich informs Hughes that he must choose between funding the airlines or his flying boat. Hughes orders Dietrich to mortgage the TWA assets so he can continue the development.

By 1947, his OCD worsens and Hughes becomes increasingly paranoid, planting microphones and tapping Gardner's phone lines to keep track of her, until she kicks him out of her house. The FBI searches his home for incriminating evidence of war profiteering, searching through his possessions.

Brewster privately offers to drop the charges if Hughes sells TWA to Trippe, but Hughes refuses. Hughes's OCD symptoms become extreme, and he retreats into an isolated "germ-free zone" for three months. Trippe has Brewster summon him for a Senate investigation, certain that Hughes will not show up. Gardner visits him and personally grooms and dresses him in preparation for the hearing.

An invigorated Hughes defends himself against Brewster's charges and accuses the Senator of taking bribes from Trippe. He concludes by announcing that he has committed to completing the H-4 aircraft, and that he will leave the country if he cannot get it to fly. Brewster's bill is promptly defeated.

After successfully flying the aircraft, Hughes speaks with Dietrich and his engineer Glenn Odekirk about a new jetliner for TWA. However, he begins hallucinating and has a panic attack. As Odekirk hides him in a restroom while Dietrich fetches a doctor, Hughes begins to have flashbacks of his childhood, his love for aviation and his ambition for success, compulsively repeating the phrase, "the way of the future".

== Cast ==
- Leonardo DiCaprio as Howard Hughes
  - Jacob Davich as 8-year-old Howard Hughes
- Cate Blanchett as Katharine Hepburn
- Kate Beckinsale as Ava Gardner
- John C. Reilly as Noah Dietrich
- Alec Baldwin as Juan Trippe
- Alan Alda as Senator Owen Brewster
- Ian Holm as Professor Fitz
- Danny Huston as Jack Frye
- Gwen Stefani as Jean Harlow
- Jude Law as Errol Flynn
- Adam Scott as Johnny Meyer
- Matt Ross as Glenn Odekirk
- Kelli Garner as Faith Domergue
- Frances Conroy as Katharine Houghton
- Brent Spiner as Robert E. Gross
- Stanley DeSantis as Louis B. Mayer
- Edward Herrmann as Joseph Breen
- Willem Dafoe as Roland Sweet
- Kevin O'Rourke as Spencer Tracy
- J. C. MacKenzie as Ludlow Ogden Smith
- Josie Maran as Thelma The Cigarette Girl
- Kenneth Welsh as Dr. Hepburn

== Production ==
=== Development ===
Warren Beatty planned to direct and star in a Howard Hughes biopic in the early 1970s. He co-wrote the script with Bo Goldman after a proposed collaboration with Paul Schrader fell through. Goldman wrote his own script, Melvin and Howard, which depicted Hughes's possible relationship with Melvin Dummar. Beatty's thoughts regularly returned to the project over the years, and in 1990, he approached Steven Spielberg to direct Goldman's script. Beatty's Hughes biopic was eventually released under the title Rules Don't Apply in 2016. Charles Evans Jr. purchased the film rights for Howard Hughes: The Untold Story (ISBN 0-525-93785-4) in 1993. Evans secured financing from New Regency Productions, but development stalled.

The Aviator was a joint production between Warner Bros. Pictures, which handled Latin American and Canadian distribution, and Disney, which released the film internationally under its Miramax Films banner in the United States and the United Kingdom. Disney previously developed a Hughes biopic with director Brian De Palma and actor Nicolas Cage between 1997 and 1998. Titled Mr. Hughes, the film would have starred Cage in the dual roles of both Hughes and Clifford Irving. It was conceived when De Palma and Cage were working on Snake Eyes with writer David Koepp. Universal Pictures joined the competition in March 1998 when it purchased the film rights to Empire: The Life, Legend and Madness of Howard Hughes (ISBN 0-393000-257), written by Donald Barlett and James Steele.

The Hughes brothers were going to direct Johnny Depp as Howard Hughes, based on a script by Terry Hayes. Universal canceled it when they decided they did not want to fast-track development to compete with Disney. In the mid-1990s and early 2000s, director Miloš Forman was in talks to direct a film about the early life of Hughes with Edward Norton as Hughes. In 2001, another version was announced to be produced and directed by William Friedkin, who intended to make a three-hour film about Hughes based on the book Hughes: The Private Diaries, Memos and Letters by Richard Hack.

In a 2002 report from Variety, it was revealed that Norman Jewison had been developing a Hughes biopic based on Terry Moore's autobiography The Beauty and the Billionaire for "more than a year" and was going to meet with John Travolta for the role. Also in the early 2000s, director Christopher Nolan had developed a film about Hughes, also based on Hack's biography. All other versions were shelved when Martin Scorsese came aboard to direct The Aviator, although Nolan would return to his Howard Hughes project after completing The Dark Knight Rises in 2012, using the book Citizen Hughes: The Power, the Money and the Madness by Michael Drosnin as the source. Nolan wrote the script, which followed the darker and final years of Hughes's life. Nolan again, shelved the project when Warren Beatty was developing his long-awaited Hughes film. It was reported that Nolan's version would have starred Jim Carrey as Hughes.

Disney restarted development on a new Howard Hughes biopic in June 1999, hiring Michael Mann to direct Leonardo DiCaprio in the role of Howard Hughes, based on a script by John Logan. The studio put it on hold again following the disappointing box-office performance of Mann's critically acclaimed The Insider. New Line Cinema picked it up in turnaround almost immediately, with Mann planning to direct after finishing Ali. Mann was eventually replaced by Scorsese, who had worked with DiCaprio on Gangs of New York. Scorsese later said that he "grossly misjudged the budget". Angelina Jolie was approached by the studios to have a role in the film, but she turned it down after learning executive producer Harvey Weinstein was involved with the film.

Hughes suffered from obsessive–compulsive disorder (OCD), most notably an obsession with germs and cleanliness. DiCaprio suffered from a mild version of the disorder as a child, which returned when filming the movie. Scorsese and DiCaprio worked closely with Dr. Jeffrey M. Schwartz of UCLA to portray the most accurate depiction of OCD. The filmmakers had to focus on the previous accounts of Hughes's behaviors, as well as the time period; when Hughes was suffering from the disorder, there was no psychiatric definition for what ailed him. Instead of receiving proper treatment, Hughes was forced to hide his stigmatized compulsions; his disorder began to conflict with everyday functioning.

DiCaprio dedicated hundreds of hours of work to portray Hughes's unique case of OCD onscreen. Apart from doing his research on Hughes, DiCaprio met with people suffering from OCD. In particular, he focused on how some individuals would compulsively and repeatedly wash their hands, inspiring the scene in which his hand starts to bleed as he scrubs it in the bathroom. The character arc of Howard Hughes was a drastic one: from the height of his career to the appearance of his compulsions, and eventually, to him sitting naked in a screening room, refusing to leave and repeating "the way of the future".

=== Cinematography ===
Hughes crashes in a field; screenshot showing the simulated bipack color film used in scenes depicting events before 1935

In an article for the American Cinematographer, John Pavlus wrote, "The film boasts an ambitious fusion of period lighting techniques, extensive effects sequences and a digital re-creation of two extinct cinema color processes: two-color and three-strip Technicolor." For the first 52 minutes of the film, scenes appear in shades of only red and cyan; green objects are rendered as blue. According to Scorsese, this was done to emulate the look of early bipack color films, in particular the Multicolor process, which Hughes owned, emulating the available technology of the era. Similarly, many of the scenes depicting events occurring after 1935 are treated to emulate the saturated appearance of three-strip Technicolor. Other scenes were stock footage colorized and are incorporated into the film. The color effects were created by Legend Films.

=== Production design ===
Scale models were used to duplicate many of the flying scenes in the film. When Martin Scorsese began planning his aviation epic, a decision was made to film flying sequences with scale models rather than CGI special effects. The critical reaction to the CGI models in Pearl Harbor (2001) had been a crucial factor in Scorsese's decision to use full-scale static and scale models in this film. The building and filming of the flying models proved both cost-effective and timely.

The primary scale models were the Spruce Goose and the XF-11; both flyable scale models were designed and fabricated over a period of several months by Aero Telemetry, an aerospace company that specializes in building unmanned air vehicles.

The 375 lb (170 kg) Spruce Goose model had a wingspan of 6.1 m (20 ft), while the 750 lb (340 kg) XF-11 had a 7.6 m (25 ft) wingspan. Another set of miniatures was built as a motion control miniature used for "beauty shots" of the model taking off and in-flight, as well as in dry dock and under construction at the miniature Hughes Hangar built by New Deal Studios. The XF-11 was reverse engineered from photographs and some rare drawings modeled in Rhinoceros 3D by the Aero Telemetry engineering department and New Deal art department. These 3D models of the Spruce Goose and the XF-11 were used for patterns and construction drawings for the model makers. In addition to the aircraft, the homes into which the XF-11 crashes were fabricated at 1:4 scale to match the 1:4 scaled XF-11. The model was rigged to be crashed and broken several times for different shots.

The Aero Telemetry team was given only three months to complete the three models, including the 450lb H-1 Racer, with a 5.5 m (18 ft) wingspan that had to stand-in for the full-scale replica that was destroyed in a crash, shortly before principal photography began.

The models were shot on location at Long Beach and other California sites from helicopter or raft platforms. The brief yet much-heralded flight of Hughes's HK-1 Hercules on November 2, 1947, was recreated in the Port of Long Beach. The motion-controlled Spruce Goose and Hughes Hangar miniatures built by New Deal Studios are on display at the Evergreen Aviation Museum in McMinnville, Oregon, with the original Hughes H-1 Spruce Goose.

== Release ==
=== Distribution ===
Warner Bros. Pictures bought North American distribution rights to The Aviator shortly before production on the film began. However, a heavy release schedule for Warner Bros. Pictures during the fourth quarter of 2004, prompted the company to start discussions to sell co-distribution rights in the United States to Miramax Films. The talks were successful, with Warner Bros. Pictures and Miramax Films equally splitting costs and revenues on the film's domestic release.

Miramax Films distributed the film in the United States theatrically as well as the United Kingdom, Ireland, Germany and Austria. Trifecta Entertainment & Media (via Miramax) also held the rights to the US television distribution, while Warner Bros. Pictures retained the rights for home distribution in North America and theatrical release in Canada, Latin America and China. Initial Entertainment Group released the film in the remaining territories around the world.

=== Box office performance ===
The Aviator was given a limited release on December 17, 2004, in 40 theaters where it grossed $858,021 on its opening weekend. It was given a wide release on December 25, 2004, and opened in 1,796 theaters in the United States, grossing $4.2 million on its opening day and $8.6 million in its opening weekend, ranking No. 4 with a per theater average of $4,805. On its second weekend, it moved up to No. 3 and grossed $11.4 million – $6,327 per theater. The film grossed $103 million in the United States and Canada and $111 million overseas, for a worldwide total of $214 million, against an estimated production cost of $110 million.

=== Home media ===
The film was released on DVD in a two-disc-set in widescreen and fullscreen versions on May 24, 2005, by Warner Home Video. The first disc includes commentary with director Martin Scorsese, editor Thelma Schoonmaker and producer Michael Mann. The second disc includes "The Making of 'The Aviator' ", "Deleted Scenes", "Behind the Scenes", "Scoring The Aviator", "Visual Effects", featurettes on Howard Hughes, as well as other special features. The DVD was nominated for Best Audio Commentary (New to DVD) at the DVD Exclusive Awards in 2006.

The film was released in high definition on Blu-ray and HD DVD on November 6, 2007.

== Reception ==
=== Critical response ===
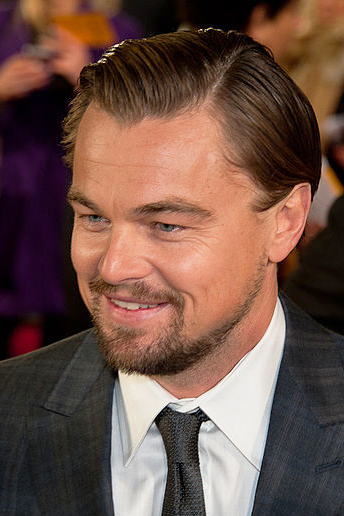
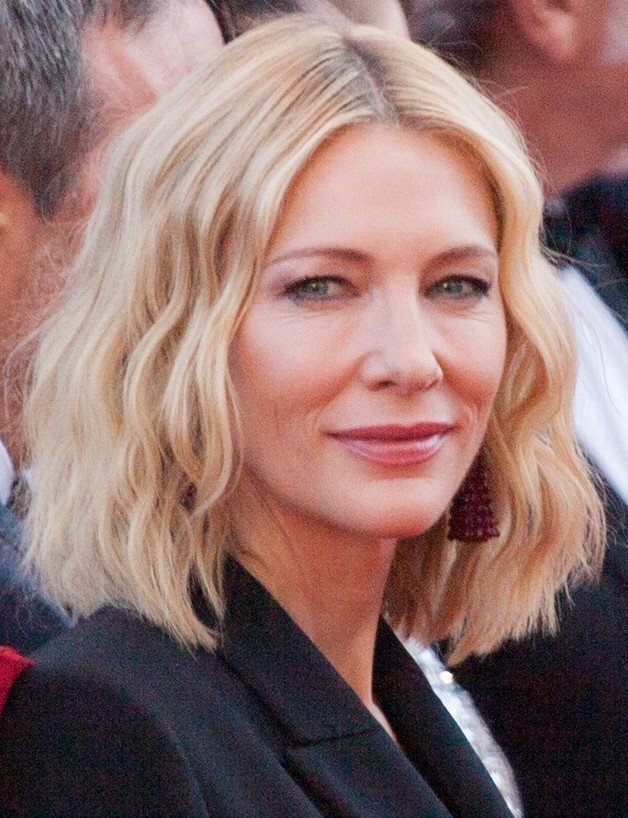
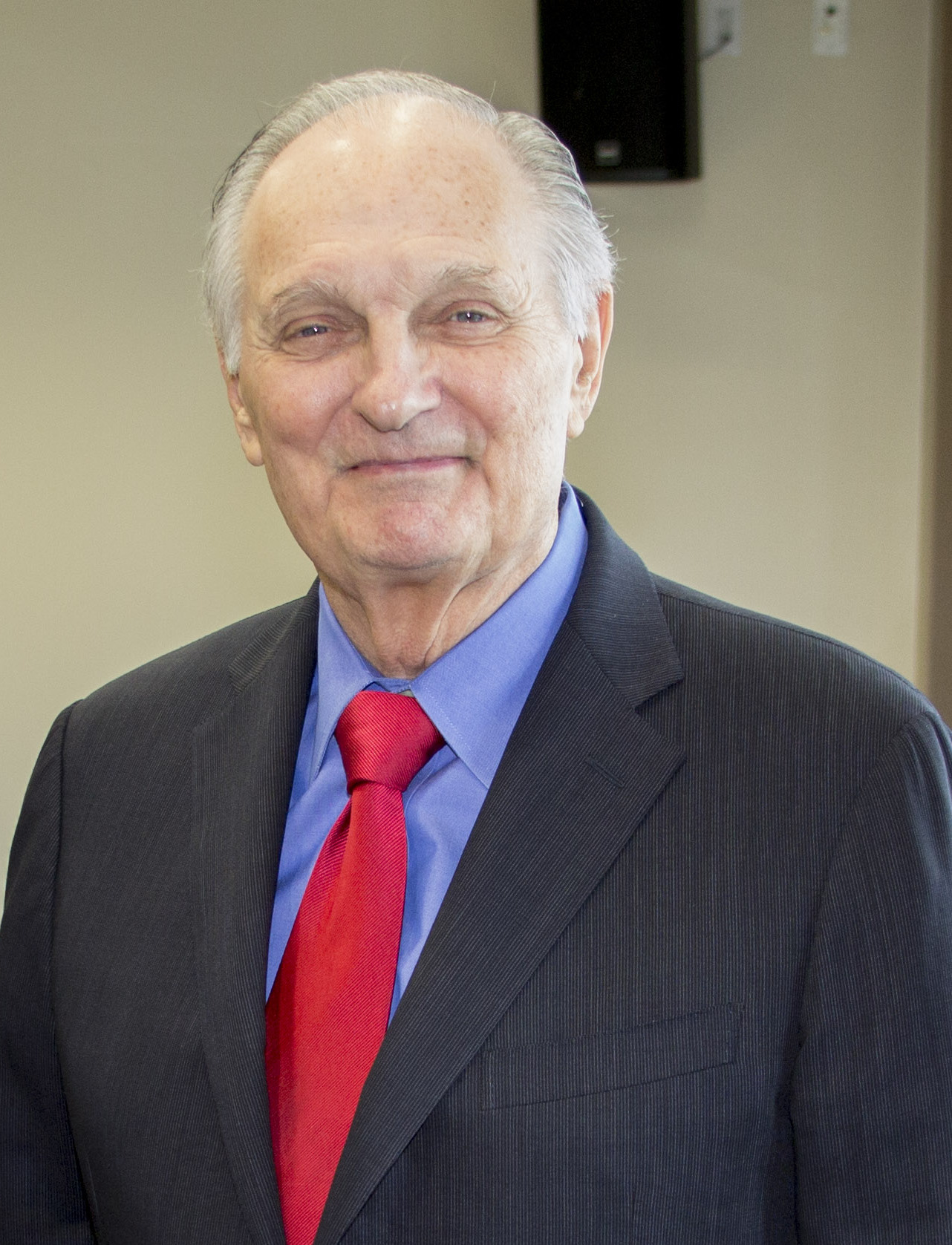
The performances of Leonardo DiCaprio, Cate Blanchett, and Alan Alda garnered widespread critical acclaim, earning them Academy Award nominations for Best Actor, Best Supporting Actress, and Best Supporting Actor, respectively, with Blanchett winning her category.

On the review aggregator website Rotten Tomatoes, The Aviator has an approval rating of 86%, based on 227 reviews, with an average rating of 7.70/10. The site's critical consensus reads: "With a rich sense of period detail, The Aviator succeeds thanks to typically assured direction from Martin Scorsese and a strong performance from Leonardo DiCaprio, who charts Howard Hughes's descent from eccentric billionaire to reclusive madman." On Metacritic, the film received a weighted average score of 77 out of 100, based on 41 critics, indicating "generally favorable" reviews. Audiences polled by CinemaScore gave the film an average grade of "B+" on a scale of A+ to F.

Roger Ebert of Chicago Sun-Times gave the film four stars out of four, and described the film and its subject Howard Hughes in these terms: "What a sad man. What brief glory. What an enthralling film...There's a match here between Scorsese and his subject, perhaps because the director's own life journey allows him to see Howard Hughes with insight, sympathy – and, up to a point, with admiration. This is one of the year's best films."

In his review for The Daily Telegraph, Sukhdev Sandhu praised Scorsese's direction, DiCaprio and the supporting cast's performances, but considered Beckinsale "miscast". Of the film, he said it is "a gorgeous tribute to the Golden Age of Hollywood", although it "tips the balance of spectacle versus substance in favour of the former".

David T. Courtwright in The Journal of American History characterized The Aviator as a technically brilliant and emotionally disturbing film. According to him, the main achievement for Scorsese is that he managed to restore the name of Howard Hughes as a pioneer aviator.

The New York Times described the film as visually appealing, but "disappointingly hollow" as an account of Hughes's early life.

The Hollywood Reporter praised the film, including the cinematography, production and set design, and editing.

Rolling Stone generally praised the film, but criticized some casting choices, including the 30-year-old DiCaprio playing Hughes in his 40's, and the performances of Gwen Stefani, Kate Beckinsale and Cate Blanchett, although noting that Blanchett warmed up to the role as the film progressed.

=== Accolades ===
The film was nominated for eleven Academy Awards, winning five for Best Cinematography, Best Film Editing, Best Costume Design, Best Art Direction and Best Supporting Actress for Blanchett. It was also nominated for fourteen BAFTAs, winning four for Best Film, Best Makeup and Hair, Best Production Design and Best Actress in a Supporting Role, six Golden Globe Awards, winning three for Best Motion Picture – Drama, Best Original Score and Best Actor – Motion Picture Drama for DiCaprio and three Screen Actors Guild Awards, winning one for Outstanding Performance by a Female Actor in a Supporting Role.

== Aircraft depicted and used ==
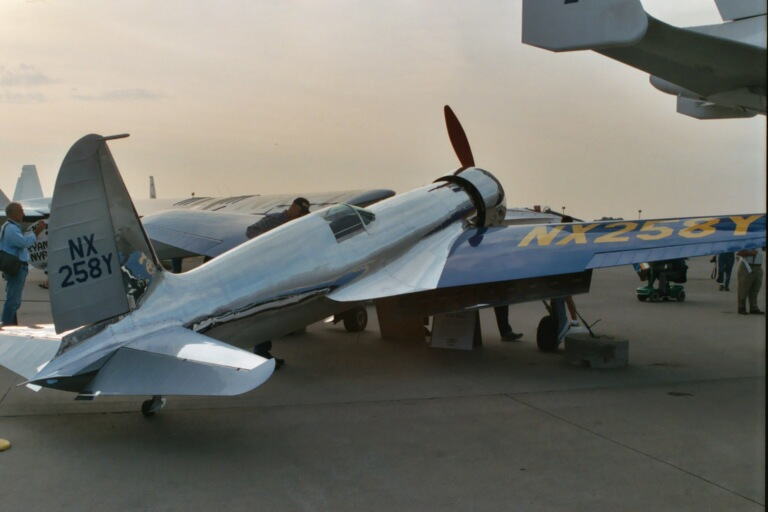
Jim Wright's replica of the Hughes H-1 Racer

Numerous aircraft were depicted and/or actually used in the film, and were organic to the story. These included aircraft Hughes had built, airliners his airline (TWA) used, and other aircraft. Among these were:

- Hughes H-1 Racer, a pioneering single-engine race plane that set speed records, including the 1935 international speed record of 352 miles per hour (566 km/h), and the 1937 U.S. transcontinental record of seven hours, 28 minutes. It featured many relatively new innovations in aircraft design, and was briefly the "state of the art" aircraft of its time. The original is in the Smithsonian's National Air and Space Museum. A replica planned for the movie crashed, and a model was used instead.
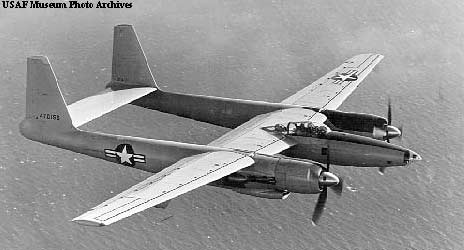
- The second XF-11, which was equipped with conventional propellers
  Hughes XF-11, a photographic reconnaissance plane—a twin-engine, twin-boom, fast, high-flying aircraft designed during World War II (WWII) to fly faster and higher than enemy fighters. It was originally commissioned by the U.S. government in a contract with Hughes Aircraft, but the war ended while the aircraft was still in development. The first prototype was equipped with troublesome contra-rotating propellers that failed while Hughes was piloting it on its maiden flight; he did not react properly to the propeller failure and was critically injured in the ensuing crash in Beverly Hills, as depicted in the film. A second prototype equipped with conventional single propellers flew successfully, but the military had chosen other aircraft for its purpose, and it was scrapped. As portrayed in the film, Hughes was subsequently accused of duping the military and failing to deliver, leading to a congressional investigation. Models replicated the plane for the movie.
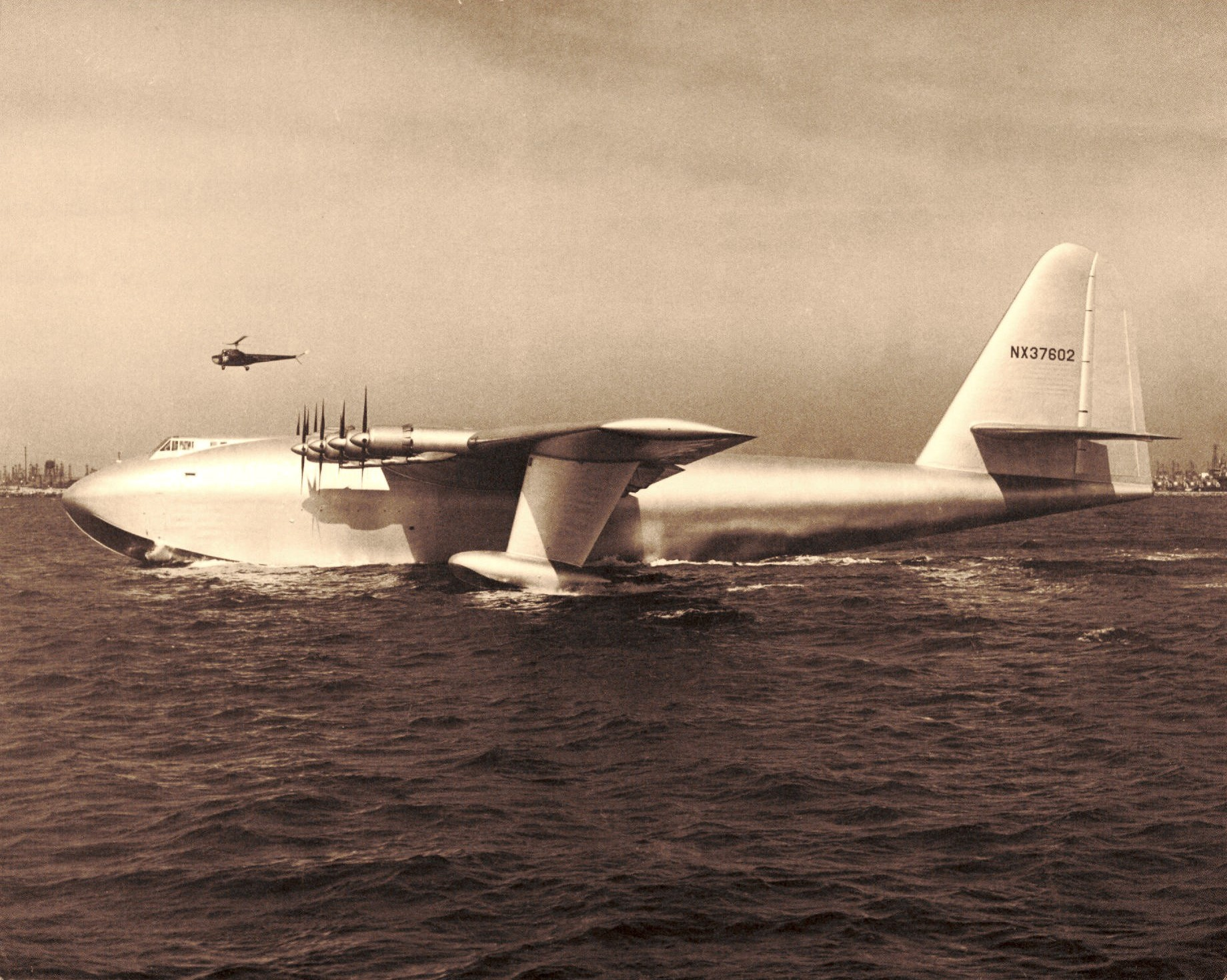
- Hughes H-4/HK-1 Hercules
  Hughes HK-1 / H-4 Hercules (nicknamed the Spruce Goose for its all-wood construction), a giant flying boat transport—one of the largest and most famous aircraft ever built. As with the XF-11, its development was originally commissioned by the U.S. government during WWII in a contract with Hughes Aircraft, the war ended while the aircraft was still in development, the contract was canceled, and it became a topic in the resulting congressional investigation. Hughes wanted to prove the Hercules could fly, and he subsequently did in a short hop in Long Beach Harbor (although historians note that the aircraft never escaped ground effect, near the surface, to fly completely free and at altitude). The airplane never flew again and became a floating museum display, dockside in the harbor—eventually moved to the Evergreen Aviation Museum in Oregon. The real aircraft was used sparingly in the movie, but only models of it actually move in the film.
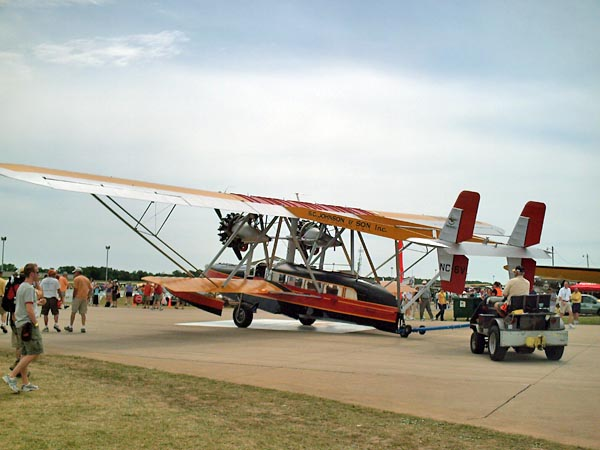
- Replica Sikorsky S-38
  Sikorsky S-38 amphibian—a "flying yacht" for the wealthy. This medium-sized, twin-engined flying boat, with retractable wheels, was among Hughes's personal aircraft. Although several were built for wealthy fliers in the 1930s (including Hughes), none survive—except for two replicas that were built in recent years at a cost of more than $1,000,000 each (used in the film).
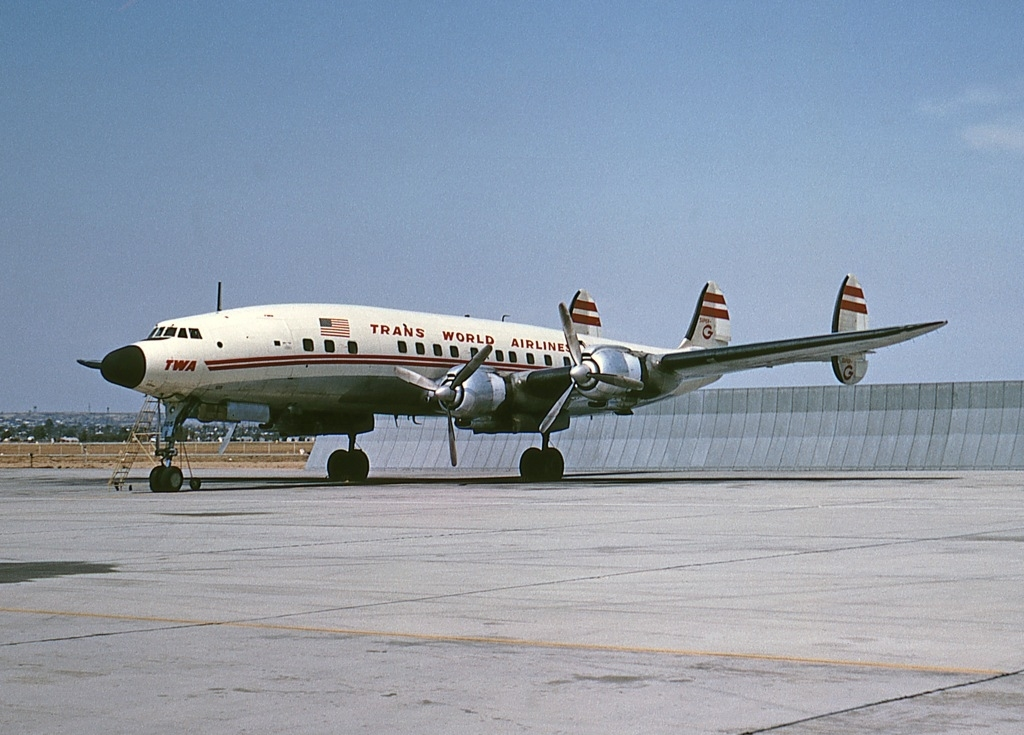
- A Lockheed L-1049 Super Constellation of TWA
  Lockheed Constellation airliner, one of the first pressurized-cabin, ocean-spanning airliners, largely developed for Hughes's airline, TWA. The airplane was conspicuous for its triple-tail vertical stabilizers and shapely curving fuselage. The Constellation was powered by four of the largest piston engines built by 1941, the Wright R-3350 Duplex-Cyclone (bested by the Pratt & Whitney R-4360 Wasp Major in 1944), becoming the most advanced airliner in the world at its inception, capable of transcontinental flights in half the normal time (as little as seven hours). It was used by the military in World War II, and became one of the world's principal airliners of the 1950s, instrumental in making TWA the world's largest airline. The film used a Lockheed L-1049 Super Constellation in TWA livery, C/N 4830 Star of America, a Constellation restored to airworthiness, flown to and from the Burbank airport for filming from Kansas City, Missouri, and stored at the National Airline History Museum (TWA's former home base).

== See also ==
- List of 2004 films based on actual events
- List of American films of 2004
- Mental illness in film
- Melvin and Howard (1980)
- The Amazing Howard Hughes (1977)
