= Noah Dietrich =

American business executive and associate of Howard R. Hughes (1889–1982)

- Born: February 28, 1889; Madison, Wisconsin
- Died: February 15, 1982 (aged 92); Palm Springs, California
- Occupations: Chief executive officer of the Howard Hughes businesses of Trans World Airlines, RKO Pictures, and Hughes Aircraft
- Years active: 1925–1957
- Notable work: Author of Howard: The Amazing Mr. Hughes

Noah Dietrich (February 28, 1889 – February 15, 1982) was an American businessman, who was the chief executive officer of the Howard Hughes business empire from 1925 to 1957. Although these dates have been recorded as the official period of employment, Noah Dietrich continued to oversee and make executive decisions for the Hughes industries as late as 1970. According to his own memoirs, he left the Hughes operation over a dispute involving putting more of his income on a capital gains basis. The manuscript of his eventual memoir, Howard: The Amazing Mr. Hughes, may have been a key, if inadvertent, source of novelist Clifford Irving's infamous fake autobiography of Hughes.

== Early life ==
Dietrich was born on February 28, 1889, in Madison, Wisconsin, the son of German-born evangelical Lutheran minister John Dietrich, and the former Sarah Peters. He graduated from Janesville High School in 1906, married in 1910, and became a bank cashier in Maxwell, New Mexico, for the next six months. They then moved to Los Angeles, where he became an auditor for the Los Angeles Suburban Land Co., and then the Janass Investment Co. In 1917, he became an assistant comptroller for Edward L. Doheny Oil companies in New York City. Then Dietrich, along with his family now consisting of his wife and two daughters, decided to move back to Los Angeles, where he worked for the CPA firm of Haskins and Sells, which later merged into what is now Deloitte. There he passed the California Board of Accountancy exam in 1923.

== Career ==
=== "Noah Can Do It" ===
In November 1925, at the age of 36, Dietrich met 19-year-old Hughes, who had gained control of Hughes Tool Company after buying out the other family heirs. Started by his father, Howard R. Hughes, Sr., Hughes Tool Company – or Toolco – manufactured oil drilling equipment, especially the multiple-edge, revolving-teeth roller cutter drill bits the elder Hughes invented.

Hughes, according to Dietrich, was "looking for someone with wide general knowledge," "Someone who is resourceful and can solve problems." Questions Hughes asked Dietrich included "how a battleship finds the range on its target?", and to "Explain the principles of the internal combustion engine," both of which Dietrich was able to answer satisfactorily.

Dietrich was hired as an executive assistant to explain the production and financial reports issued by Hughes' tool company, eventually becoming Hughes' personal delegate. In his memoir, Dietrich observed that Hughes had little interest in Toolco, other than as a source of revenue. "The tool company," he quoted Hughes as saying, "was my father's success. And it always will be." The company's earnings, however, allowed Hughes to pursue his interest in Hollywood movies.

When still in his early twenties, Hughes told Dietrich, "My first objective is to become the world's number one golfer. Second, the top aviator, and third I want to become the world's most famous motion picture producer. Then, I want you to make me the richest man in the world."

In time, Dietrich came to serve as an executive for most of Hughes' enterprises, including Trans World Airlines (TWA), RKO Pictures and Hughes Aircraft.

Dietrich became Hughes' most indispensable executive – "Noah can do it" was, according to Dietrich's memoir, a frequent Hughes expression whenever difficult, if not impossible, wants or needs needed to be met. Some – such as when Dietrich arranged a stock ticker to be installed in a Hughes home – were merely difficult. Others – such as the time Dietrich arranged the shipment of Hughes' large private liquor stock from his Texas home to his California home during Prohibition – put him at serious risk.

Dietrich guided the expansion of Hughes empire by using Hughes Tool Co. profits to purchase real estate, thus avoiding penalties for excess accumulated surplus. Hughes also limited his salary to $50,000 per year, without dividend payments, thus limiting his income tax. All of Hughes' major expenses, planes, automobiles, houses, etc., were also charged to Hughes Tool Co. as business expenses. Hughes even said of Dietrich, "He knows more about my business than I do," referring to Noah as a "genius".

Some of Dietrich's duties got him caught in the middle of disputes with members of Hughes' family. During a period when Hughes refused to talk to anyone outside a few business associates, Dietrich recalled, a Hughes' aunt Loomis accused Dietrich – who turned out to have been kept in the dark about Hughes' exact whereabouts himself – "of hiding his body and running things" himself. When Hughes returned, Dietrich wrote, he made a special point of calling this aunt. "I didn't want her to continue believing that I was running the Hughes empire while I kept her nephew in the Deep-freeze." A few years later, while Hughes was recovering from injuries he sustained in the crash of his experimental XF-11 aircraft, Hughes refused a visit from his favorite aunt Annette Lummis, and her husband Dr. Fred Lummis. The uncle turned to Dietrich and said, "Now I can better understand your problems in dealing with Hughes. I don't understand him at all."

In 1946, Hughes put Dietrich in charge of Toolco. Dietrich proceeded to modernize the company, and was able to increase profits to the point that Hughes Tool Co. made $285,000,000 in profits over the next eight years.

Dietrich also discussed in considerable detail the real impetus behind the government's investigation of Hughes Aircraft following World War II. Ostensibly, the probe involved Hughes' failure to deliver the infamous flying boat, the Hercules, a military transport aircraft, to the government on time. Dietrich wrote, however, that the real purpose of the probe may have been neutralizing Hughes, owner of TWA, while rival Pan Am – whose president, Juan Trippe, had implored Maine Senator Owen Brewster to carry it – pushed for a federal law establishing only one official American carrier of international air traffic, and Pan Am becoming that carrier.

Dietrich discussed the famous Hughes counterattack before the Senate committee investigating him– and revealed that both his own and Hughes' hotel suites had been bugged during the hearings, allegedly at the behest of Brewster and Trippe. The hearings, and Hughes' legendary triumph over them, helped end both the legislation and Brewster's political career; On Hughes' orders, Dietrich poured money into a challenger's campaign a few years later.

By 1948, Dietrich wrote that his duties were getting "immensely onerous", "If an executive had to be fired, 'Noah can do it.' If millions had to be raised overnight, 'Noah can do it.' If a politico or a starlet had to be paid off, 'Noah can do it.' Noah was getting tired of doing it."

=== Falling out with Hughes ===
Though Dietrich was pulling in a salary of $500,000 per year, his tax burden was 70% on the first $100,000 and then 93% for the remainder. Dietrich wanted compensation based on a stock option, which was subject only to a tax of 25%. Yet, Dietrich wrote, Hughes "simply could not bring himself to let anyone share in his ownership."

In 1957, after working for Hughes for 32 years, Dietrich left the Hughes organization over a capital-gains dispute. Hughes had promised to make more of Dietrich's income on a capital gains basis. At the time of the falling-out, Hughes was trying to finance jets for TWA. He had decided to inflate Hughes Tool profits to sell the company to pay for the jets. Hughes had rejected all other financing solutions, because they threatened to dilute his TWA ownership. At the same juncture, Hughes, Dietrich recalled, also did everything in his power to stop Dietrich's long-planned African safari with his two sons, the first long vacation Dietrich had taken in decades of working for Hughes. Dietrich returned from Africa, he wrote, and finally agreed to go to Texas to implement the plan – on condition that Hughes finally implement the capital gains agreement. When Hughes refused, Dietrich immediately quit – stunning Hughes. (Dietrich quoted Hughes as saying, "Noah, I can't exist without you!")

Hughes didn't let him go without a fight. After pleading failed, Hughes tried to strong-arm Dietrich into reconsidering, going so far, Dietrich recorded, as changing the lock on Dietrich's office, a practice Hughes had followed when top executives were fired or otherwise departed the Hughes operation, Dietrich recalled. Hughes also sought Dietrich's interest in their oil partnerships. Dietrich wrote that he surrendered his interest just to be rid of Hughes, a move he later regretted, since the leases turned big profits eventually. Dietrich got a court order to reclaim many of his personal possessions from his old offices.

=== Post-Hughes career and memoirs ===
After parting ways with Hughes, Dietrich, as a financial and executive advisor, served on several corporate and financial boards, as well as traveling to many speaking engagements. His 1971 memoir, Howard: The Amazing Mr. Hughes, provided many with the first inside look into the world of Howard Hughes. The memoir provided insight into his occasional lack of concern towards how the things he wanted done often required breaches of ethics or even the law. Only when he was diagnosed with myasthenia gravis (the same illness that shipping magnate Aristotle Onassis died of), did Dietrich finally retire in full.

Dietrich wrote of Hughes, "Of all his possessions, TWA held a certain mystique for him. He didn't give a damn about the tool company, except as a source of wealth. Hughes Aircraft was an avocation for him, and an outlet for his tendency to tinker. RKO was a heady diversion, an opportunity to pursue his sensual enjoyments."

== Personal life ==
By 1936, he had divorced his first wife, and their two daughters were married. By 1945, Dietrich had three children with his second wife. By 1951, Dietrich was separated from his second wife. After leaving Hughes in 1957, Dietrich married for a third time.

In his book Howard, Dietrich wrote, "I much preferred the more exciting life," rather than the sedate life of a CPA. He wrote the book "to leave, for my children and grandchildren, a record of the role I played in a colorful subchapter of American history," and in part, so "the American public should be informed on the uses and misuses of great wealth."

Time revealed in 1972 that a copy of an early draft of the manuscript for Dietrich's memoir, ghost-written by journalist James Phelan, may have fallen into Clifford Irving's hands, and identified the draft as a key element in Irving's being able to convince publishers and others that his hoax Hughes autobiography was genuine. "The instances of duplicated material are numerous," the magazine wrote. "In some cases, the books are virtually identical in detail. In others, they are substantively the same, although the Irving manuscript has been reworded and otherwise disguised. One curiosity: the writing in the Irving manuscript is much better than that in the hastily drafted Phelan version. It is ironic that Irving may be more convincing as a forger than as an author in his own right– just as Elmyr de Hory, Irving's Ibiza friend and the main character in his book Fake!, is much better at doing Picassos and Modiglianis than he is at doing De Horys." When he later wrote his own memoir, The Hoax, Irving corroborated the hypothesis posited by the Time article, writing that he indeed obtained and made a copy of a draft of Dietrich's manuscript, which he then used as source material for his fabricated Hughes autobiography.

Dietrich and Phelan eventually settled for $40,000 after Dietrich became dissatisfied with Phelan's work. He then turned the project over to another journalist, Bob Thomas, who finished the Dietrich memoir within six weeks.

== Death ==
On February 15, 1982, Dietrich died of heart failure in a hospital in Palm Springs, California. He was just thirteen days short of his 93rd birthday. He was buried at Forest Lawn Memorial Park, in Glendale, California.

== TV/movie adaptations ==
Noah Dietrich has been portrayed within several adaptations:

- Ed Flanders portrayed Dietrich alongside Tommy Lee Jones as Hughes in the 1977 mini-series The Amazing Howard Hughes. Released one year after Hughes' death, Dietrich's role is highlighted from his commencement with Hughes as Accountant, his subsequent contribution in restructuring Hughes Empire, and his later departure.
- Eli Wallach portrayed Dietrich in the 2006 film The Hoax, about author Clifford Irving's faked Howard Hughes autobiography.
- John C. Reilly portrayed Dietrich alongside Leonardo DiCaprio as Hughes in the 2004 film The Aviator. A criticism of this adaptation was that it downplayed the role Dietrich played in assisting Hughes in amassing his fortune.
- Martin Sheen portrayed Dietrich in the 2016 film Rules Don't Apply.
- As mentioned in this article, there was a time when no one knew where recluse Howard Hughes was, while Noah Dietrich was in charge of the various Hughes enterprises. The film Diamonds Are Forever makes reference to that, with Charles Gray playing a character running the missing billionaire from the aerospace industry.
