= Potsy =

Potsy, Pottsy, or Potsie is a nickname. Uses include:

- Potsie Weber, character in the television show Happy Days
- Potsy Jones (1909–1990), American football player
- Potsy Clark (1894–1972), American football player and coach
- Potsy Ponciroli, American filmmaker
- Pottsy, a comic strip by Jay Irving
- Pottsy, a character in M (1951) played by Raymond Burr
- Pottsy, a character in Turnout played by Peter Ferdinando
- Benjamin "Pottsy" Potts, a participant in Whale Wars
- Potsy, a variant of hopscotch
- Potsy, the main character of the video game Crackpots
