= The Amazing Howard Hughes =

American television biographical film (1977)

- Based on: Howard: The Amazing Mr. Hughes by Noah Dietrich
- Written by: John Gay
- Directed by: William A. Graham
- Starring: Tommy Lee Jones; Ed Flanders; James Hampton; Tovah Feldshuh; Lee Purcell
- Music by: Laurence Rosenthal
- Country of origin: United States
- Original language: English
- No. of episodes: 2

Production
- Executive producer: Roger Gimbel
- Producer: Herbert Hirschman
- Cinematography: Michael Margulies
- Editor: Aaron Stell
- Running time: 185 minutes
- Production companies: EMI Television; Roger Gimbel Productions

Original release
- Network: CBS
- Release: April 13 – April 14, 1977

The Amazing Howard Hughes is a 1977 American made-for-television biographical film about American aviation pioneer and filmmaker Howard Hughes, based on the book Howard: The Amazing Mr. Hughes by Hughes' business partner Noah Dietrich. The film starred Tommy Lee Jones, Ed Flanders, and Tovah Feldshuh. The Amazing Howard Hughes recounts the life and times of Howard Hughes and was made within a year of Hughes's death in April 1976. It was originally broadcast in two parts on CBS on April 13 and 14, 1977.

== Plot ==
Howard Hughes (Tommy Lee Jones), from early life, is portrayed as an eccentric perfectionist and later, a hypochondriac. He grew up as a wealthy but isolated individual who was able to indulge some of his obsessions. As a Hollywood producer, he was able to create some of the most memorable films of the era, including Hell's Angels (1930), Scarface (1932) and The Outlaw (1943, 1946). His passion as an aviator led to both designing as the head of the Hughes Aircraft Company, as well as flying top-secret aircraft he had built in record-breaking speed and endurance flights (Hughes H-1 Racer).

As well as pouring money into films and projects such as the huge H-4 Hercules aircraft, Hughes is also seen with many of the women in his life, including Jean Harlow, Ginger Rogers, Katharine Hepburn (Tovah Feldshuh), and Jane Russell (Marla Carlis).

An incident in 1946 involved a test flight of the XF-11, an experimental aircraft. The test flight culminated in a horrific crash, resulting in a concussion that left Hughes with brain damage and mental dysfunction going into his old age and eventual death. His final years were spent as a recluse, and Hughes died while aboard a private flight to Houston.

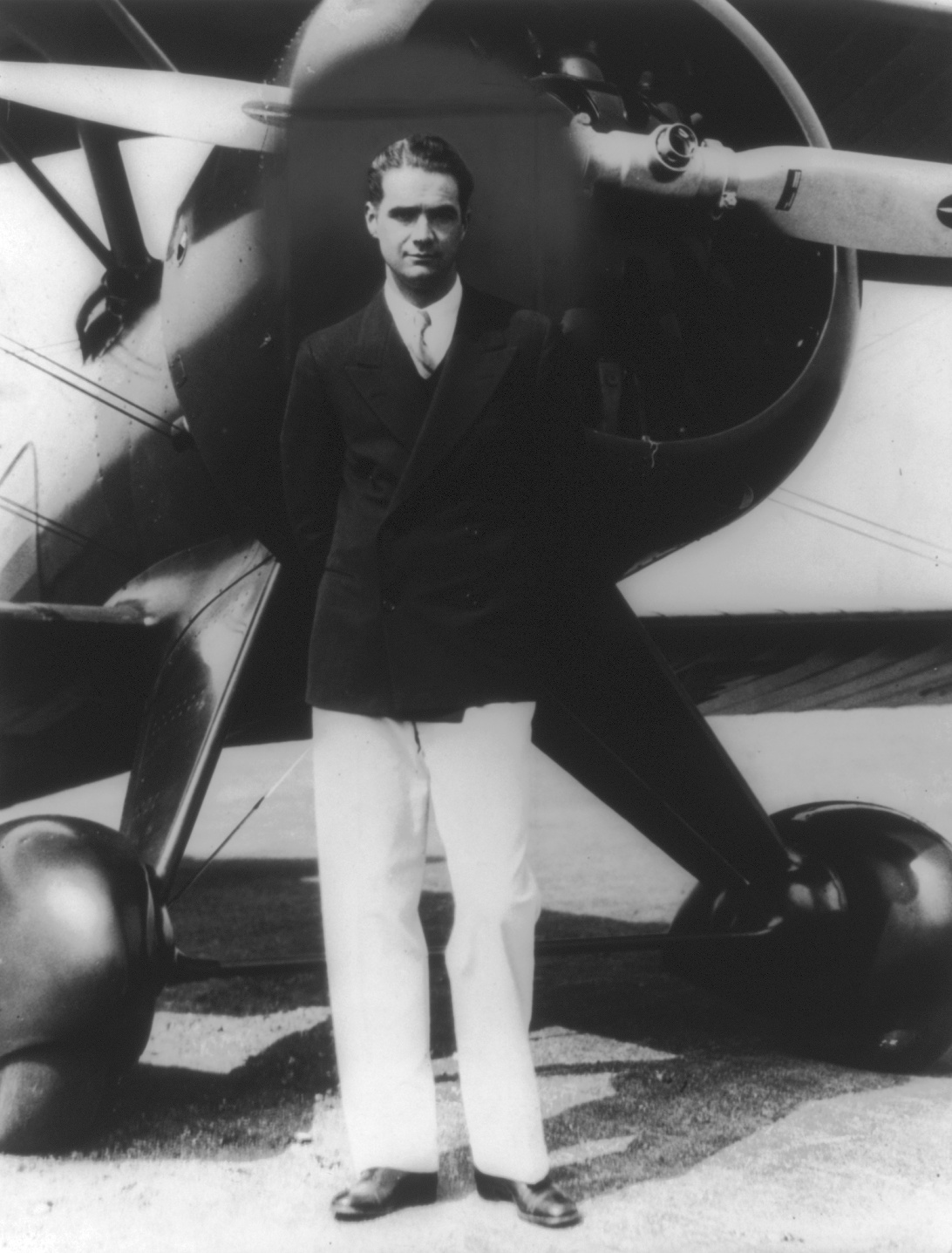
Howard Hughes, circa 1940s

== Cast ==
- Tommy Lee Jones as Howard Hughes
- Ed Flanders as Noah Dietrich
- Lee Purcell as Billie Dove
- Sorrell Booke as Mayor Fiorello LaGuardia
- James Hampton as Wilbur Peterson
- Howard Hesseman as Jenks
- Tovah Feldshuh as Katharine Hepburn
- Marla Carlis as Jane Russell
- Ed Harris as Russ

== Production ==
=== Development ===
In 1971, Bob Thomas was contacted by director George Sidney, who had gotten to know the writer while the latter was researching King Cohn, a biography of Harry Cohn. Sidney said Stanley Meyer, the financier, was looking for someone to help write Noah Dietrich's memoirs. Thomas met with Dietrich and wrote a book about Hughes. They struggled to find a publisher due to the fact Clifford Irving had released Hughes' diaries. When it was revealed the diaries were fake, the book found a publisher, Fawcett, the next day.

Fawcett released a million copies but only sold a third of them, which Thomas attributed to Irving's book. On the death of Hughes in 1976, numerous producers announced Hughes projects, including Warren Beatty and David Wolper, the latter based on Irving's book. Thomas' agents succeeded in selling the film rights to Thomas' book to Roger Gimbel who had a deal with EMI Television.

The project was originally developed by Roger Gimbel's production company.

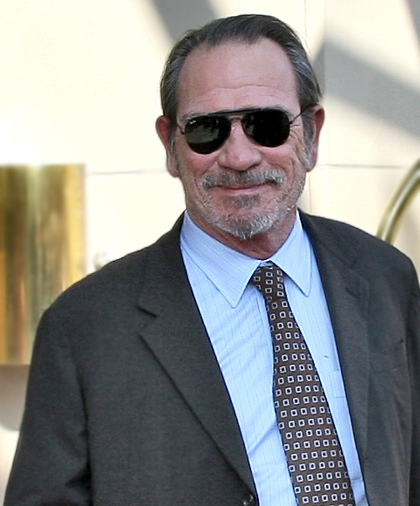
Tommy Lee Jones (circa 2007) portrayed Howard Hughes in the 1977 production.

=== Casting ===
At one stage, Gimbel had negotiations with Warren Beatty to play Hughes. But when these broke down the producer decided to go "180 degrees the other way" and cast an unknown. He picked Tommy Lee Jones who had appeared in films such as Jackson County Jail and who Gimbel said "matches the image the public has of Hughes". The Amazing Howard Hughes was a major break-through for Jones.

=== Shooting ===
Filming of The Amazing Howard Hughes took eight weeks. During filming, Gimbel's company was bought out by EMI Television. (This would be the first of a series of TV movies made by EMI.

A large group of aircraft were assembled for the production by Tallmantz Aviation. The aircraft included two Curtiss JN-4 biplanes, Learjet 23, Lockheed P-38 Lightning, Lockheed Model 12 Electra Junior, North American AT-6 Texan, and Royal Aircraft Factory S.E.5.

The incident in 1972 where Howard Hughes made a rare public "appearance" by conference call in order to denounce Clifford Irving's book to a group of trusted journalists Hughes had known personally, was recreated with four of the actual participants instead of actors: James Bacon from Hearst, Marvin G. Miles of the LA Times, Gene Handsaker from AP and Wayne Thomas of the Chicago Tribune.

== Reception ==
Film historian Simon D. Beck in The Aircraft-Spotter's Film and Television Companion (2016) described The Amazing Howard Hughes as a "... fascinating account of the life and times of eccentric millionaire, aviation pioneer and filmmaker ..." Other reviews of The Amazing Howard Hughes were, likewise, mainly positive. Part one was the fifth highest-rated show of the week; part two was the highest-rated. It was seen by over 60 million people.

Universal agreed to distribute The Amazing Howard Hughes theatrically outside the United States.

The Amazing Howard Hughes was the original release of EMI Television, an off-shoot of EMI Films. (Note: Some versions of this DVD are only 123 minutes. The original mini-series was 185 minutes.)

== See also ==
- Melvin and Howard (1980)
- The Aviator (2004)
