= Reuben C. Baker =

Oil industry tool pioneer

Reuben "Carl" Baker
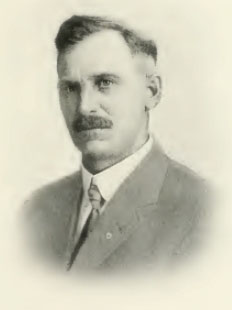
- Reuben "Carl" Baker in 1919
- Born: Reuben Carlton Baker; July 18, 1872; Purcellville, Virginia U.S.
- Died: September 29, 1957 (aged 85); Whittier, California, U.S.
- Occupations: Founder of Baker Hughes, inventor, businessman
- Known for: Pioneering inventions in the oil industry
- Spouse: Minnie Myrtle Zumwalt (m. 1897; died 1947)
- Children: Thelma Ellen Baker (daughter); Reuben Carlton Baker Jr. (son)

Reuben Carlton "Carl" Baker, Sr. (July 18, 1872 – September 29, 1957) was an American oil industry drilling pioneer. He established Baker Oil Tools in 1907 after developing a casing shoe that revolutionized cable tool drilling. In 1903, he introduced the offset bit for cable tool drilling to enable casing wells in hard rock and in 1912 the cement retainer that allowed casing to be cemented in the wells. Baker further improved the process with the float shoe in 1923. Having only a third grade education, he obtained more than 150 patents on oil drilling tools. Baker Oil Tools merged with Hughes Tool Company in 1987 to form Baker Hughes Incorporated.

== Personal life ==
On December 12, 1897, he married his childhood sweetheart Minnie Myrtle Zumwalt (October 24, 1870 – April 20, 1947). They moved to Coalinga from Los Angeles in 1899. They had two children, Thelma Ellen Baker (January 9, 1901 – April 13, 1986; later Anderson) and Reuben Carlton Baker, Jr. (October 18, 1902 – October 1, 1965).

== Early life ==
Baker was born to Mary Elizabeth (née Stroud) and Reuben Baker in Purcellville, Virginia, and grew up in Shasta County, California. His father, a Civil War veteran from Chester County, Pennsylvania, had a farm that was not very productive. Baker never advanced beyond the third grade. In 1895, at age 23, he decided to go to Alaska to prospect for gold. He got as far as Redding, California, when he ran out of money. He worked in a stone quarry and slept in a barn for two weeks, earning $24, but his clothes were stolen from the barn one day while he worked. An acquaintance suggested he head south instead, where oil had been discovered in Southern California.

== Career ==
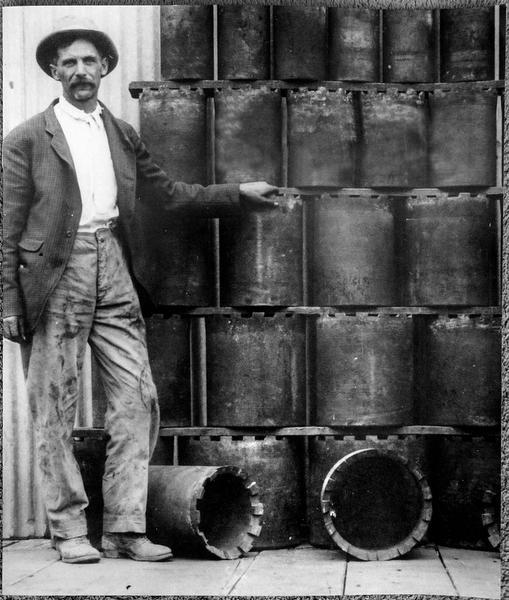
Reuben C. Baker posing in 1914 next to a stack of Baker Casing Shoes, a device he invented to ensure the uninterrupted flow of oil.

Baker's older brother, Aaron Alphonso Baker, Sr. (December 10, 1867 – September 15, 1942) had been a dry goods merchant in Fall River Township, Shasta County before he went into the oil business.

Baker's followed his brother Aaron into the oil business. He arrived in Los Angeles on April 4, 1895, with a new suit and 95 cents in his pocket. His first job was driving a horse team hauling oil in the Los Angeles City Oil Field for US$2.00 for a 12-hour day. He soon got a job as an oilwell pumper, and then as a tool dresser for Irving Carl, a contract driller. When Carl couldn’t pay Baker’s wages, he made him his partner instead. Two years later, they had two rigs and a profitable business. In 1898, they divided their assets.

In 1899, Baker moved to Coalinga, California, where he continued as a drilling contractor, introducing one of the first rotary rigs in the San Joaquin Valley that same year. As he drilled he began to discover ways he could improve the equipment. He invented an improved drill bit with a dovetail groove in the side with a hole extending across the groove with a shank, key, and screw. He intended to continue as a contract driller and use his improvements to make his drilling business more competitive. After encountering layers of hard rock in the Coalinga area, Baker developed an offset bit for cable tool drilling that made it easier to get casing down a freshly drilled hole.

Baker and his brother Aaron formed the Coalinga Petroleum Company on January 23, 1905, capitalized with US$75,000, initially owning six wells in Fresno County, They sold the business to Samuel Allen "Al" Guiberson, Jr. on December 20, 1920. In 1909, Baker's competitor Howard R. Hughes, Sr. patented the first roller cone drill bit, which made it possible to drill through deeper, harder rock. This was the basis for the Hughes Tool Company.

Baker organized the St. Paul Consolidated Oil Company on September 24, 1910, with US$600,000 in capital. Baker was president and W. T. Knowles was secretary. They owned five wells in Fresno County. Four years later, on January 4, 1911, Baker formed the Coalinga Lost Hills Oil Company with US$75,000 in capital. He served as president and Robert Lee Peeler as secretary.

In 1912, Baker invented a way to make cementing more efficient and effective. The Baker Cement Retainer was designed to pack off between the casing and tubing when pumping cement through tubing. He then started working on a casing shoe, a device to ensure the uninterrupted flow of oil through a well at the bottom of the casing. The next year, Baker organized the Baker Casing Shoe Company to take advantage of changes in U.S. income tax law, to hold his patents, and to collect royalties from the patents. He licensed the invention to third parties to manufacture, market, and use the casing shoe, while he continued in the contract drilling business. Over the next five years, the company received from $600 to $1,500 per month in royalties. By 1918 he decided the leasing business had greater opportunity and bought a machine shop in Coalinga. He left the contact drilling business and concentrated on finding ways to improve drilling tools. He patented those improvements and began selling the tools to other drillers.

Baker formed other businesses. With his brother Aaron formed the Future Success Oil Company, with Carl as president and Aaron as secretary, with US$100,000 of capital on May 3, 1913. His business interests included farming and oil production companies.

When he needed a better base of operations for the company he moved back to Los Angeles and bought a yard on Slauson Avenue. In 1921 he started working on an improved and simplified dump bailer, and also a cement retainer. At the same time the Long Beach Oil Field was discovered and with that Baker returned to the Los Angeles area.

== Death and legacy ==
Carl Baker, Sr. died in Whittier, California, in 1957 at the age of 85. Baker Oil Tool Company and Hughes Tool Company merged in 1987 to form Baker Hughes Incorporated. By then both were global oilfield service leaders with many innovative product lines.

== Patents ==
Baker received more than 150 U.S. patents in his lifetime. A few of the early patents that Baker received included:

- "Drilling Bit", patented December 22, 1903
- "Gas Trap for Oil Wells", patented August 25, 1908
- "Well Casing Shoe", patented November 11, 1913
- "Plug for Well Casings", on November 18, 1913
- "Pump-Plunger", on June 23, 1914
- "Shoe Guide for Well Casings", on November 16, 1920
