= The Hoax =

2006 American comedy-drama film

- Theatrical poster
- Directed by: Lasse Hallström
- Screenplay by: William Wheeler
- Based on: The Hoax by Clifford Irving
- Produced by: Mark Gordon; Bob Yari; Betsy Beers; Leslie Holleran; Joshua D. Maurer
- Starring: Richard Gere; Alfred Molina; Marcia Gay Harden; Hope Davis; Julie Delpy; Stanley Tucci
- Cinematography: Oliver Stapleton
- Edited by: Andrew Mondshein
- Music by: Carter Burwell
- Production companies: Miramax Films; Bob Yari Productions; The Mark Gordon Company; City Entertainment
- Distributed by: Miramax Films; Yari Film Group
- Release dates: October 15, 2006 (Rome Film Fest); October 20, 2006 (Italy); April 6, 2007 (United States)
- Running time: 116 minutes
- Country: United States
- Language: English
- Budget: $25 million
- Box office: $11.8 million

The Hoax is a 2006 American comedy-drama film starring Richard Gere, directed by Swedish filmmaker Lasse Hallström. The screenplay by William Wheeler is based on the book of the same title by Clifford Irving. It recounts Irving's elaborate hoax of publishing an autobiography of Howard Hughes that he purportedly helped write, without ever having talked with Hughes.

The screenplay was considerably different from the book. Hired as a technical adviser to the film, Irving was displeased with the product and later asked to have his name removed from the credits. It nonetheless earned a positive critical reception, but was a box office bomb, grossing only $11.8 million against a budget of $25 million.

== Plot ==
In 1971, publishing executives at McGraw-Hill express an interest in Clifford Irving's novel, Rudnick's Problem. Fake!, his previous book about art forger Elmyr de Hory, had sold poorly. Irving believes he has a breakout work, but the publisher decides against releasing the book after a Life editor deems it unsatisfactory.

Vacationing with his friend and researcher Richard Suskind, Irving is ejected from his hotel in the middle of the night after eccentric billionaire Howard Hughes arrives and demands the entire building be vacated. Returning to New York City to meet with his publishers, Irving finds he has been reduced to meeting with an assistant. Irving storms into the board room, says his new project will be the "book of the century", and threatens to take it elsewhere. He struggles to come up with a topic fit for his grandiose claim. Seeing a cover story on Hughes, he decides to make him the subject.

Irving tells McGraw-Hill that Hughes has recruited him to help write his autobiography, and shows forged handwritten notes from Hughes as proof. Handwriting experts confirm the notes as genuine, and the publishers strike a $500,000 deal for the book. Irving believes that the reclusive Hughes is unlikely to sue him, and that his eccentricities can be used to deflect any denials of authenticity for the book.

At the time Irving is having marital problems with his artist wife Edith after an affair with Nina van Pallandt. Irving assures Edith he will be faithful as he leaves to begin research with Suskind. To fool experts, the two men devote days to studying documents pertaining to Hughes. They illicitly obtain a copy of a draft biography of Noah Dietrich, a retired Hughes aide, which provides details that add to the apparent authenticity of their work. Irving recites passages into a tape recorder while in character as Hughes, dressing like the millionaire and adding a mustache during these sessions.

As work on the book progresses, Irving receives a box containing scandalous material about questionable dealings between Hughes and President Richard Nixon. He believes that Hughes sent the package and convinces himself that Hughes wants this damaging material included in the book, as a sign he supports the work.

As the publication date draws near, Irving elaborates his hoax, staging an "aborted" meeting between Hughes and the publishers. Hughes has officially denied that he is involved in the work, but the McGraw-Hill executives are convinced it is genuine. They begin to think it will be a bestseller, and Irving works to gain larger payments for himself and (purportedly) Hughes. Irving and Edith concoct a scheme for her to deposit Hughes's check, payable to "H. R. Hughes", into a Swiss bank account using a forged passport with the name "Helga R. Hughes."

The continuing drama makes Irving increasingly paranoid. He has alcohol-fueled fantasies about being kidnapped by Hughes's people. His affair with Van Pallandt continues, and the pressure of keeping up a pretense of fidelity with his wife adds to his stress. In what is implied to be a favor to Nixon, Hughes goes public via a televised conference call and denies any knowledge of Irving or the book. Irving is arrested and agrees to cooperate if Edith is granted immunity. At a press conference, a government spokesman announces that Irving, Edith, and Suskind have received short jail sentences.

An overheard radio report details a sudden wave of legal decisions in favor of Hughes. Irving believes this indicates that his book had been used to place the president in debt to Hughes. A fleeting scene set inside the Nixon White House suggests that Nixon's preoccupation with Hughes led directly to the burglary and wiretapping of Democratic Headquarters at the Watergate Hotel. Historians and political analysts dispute this.

== Cast ==
- Richard Gere as Clifford Irving
- Alfred Molina as Richard Suskind
- Marcia Gay Harden as Edith Irving
- Hope Davis as Andrea Tate
- Julie Delpy as Nina van Pallandt
- Stanley Tucci as Shelton Fisher
- Eli Wallach as Noah Dietrich
- Christopher Evan Welch as Albert Vanderkamp
- Peter McRobbie as George Gordon Holmes
- Željko Ivanek as Ralph Graves
- Milton Buras as Howard Hughes

== Production ==
Portions of the film were shot in the Coachella Valley, California. Clifford Irving was hired by the producers as technical adviser. The screenplay was changed considerably from the book, and Irving was unhappy with the result. He said, "after reading the final script I asked that my name be removed from the movie credits."

== Critical reception ==
A.O. Scott of The New York Times said the film was "for the most part a jumpy, suspenseful caper, full of narrow escapes, improbable reversals and complicated intrigue. But it has a sinister, shadowy undertow, an intimation of dread that lingers after Irving’s game is up."

Kenneth Turan of the Los Angeles Times said the film was "an unexpectedly satisfying fantasia of reality and imagination, a meditation on the nature of lies and deception, on how we come to embrace not the truth but what it suits us to believe ... sharply written ... and gracefully directed."

Peter Travers of Rolling Stone rated the film 3 1/2 out of four stars and described it as a "devilish and devastating satire." He added, "Gere gives 'em the old razzle-dazzle with his roguish charm and sharp comic timing. The surprise is the unexpected feeling he brings to this challenging role."

Deborah Young of Variety describe the film as a "breezy, fast-paced, somewhat loose-ended account [that] offers a surprisingly layered vehicle for a maniacally conniving Richard Gere, backed up by a superb Alfred Molina as his accomplice."

The film was ranked as one of the Top 10 of the year by the Los Angeles Times and Newsweek. On Rotten Tomatoes, the film has received an 85% positive rate, based on 151 reviews. The site's consensus states: "The Hoax is an enormously appealing film, thanks to the uniformly excellent performances and Lasse Hallström's zippy direction." While on Metacritic, the film scored 70 out of 100, based on 37 reviews.

== Box office ==
The Hoax was given a limited opening in 235 theaters in the United States and Canada on April 6, 2007 and earning $1,449,320 on its opening weekend. It eventually grossed $7,164,995 in the US and Canada and $4,607,188 in foreign markets for a total worldwide box office of $11,772,183.

== Accolades ==
The London Film Critics Circle nominated Alfred Molina for British Supporting Actor of the Year, and Richard Gere was nominated for the Satellite Award for Best Actor – Motion Picture Musical or Comedy.

== Comparison to book and persons ==
While the major events portrayed did take place, the film takes several dramatic liberties. It eliminates all scenes from the book set in Ibiza, where Irving owned a farmhouse and wrote much of the book.

The author described the film as "a historically cockeyed story" and decried its characterizations as inaccurate. He was unhappy with being portrayed as "desperate and humorless, a washed-up hack writer who lives in a conservative New York suburb." Irving observed, "The movie misses the point that the Howard Hughes hoax was a live-action adventure story concocted by two middle-aged hippie expat writers and a Swiss heiress. Edith, my then-wife, a woman of great zest, is portrayed as a dull hausfrau, and Nina van Pallandt, my Danish mistress, as barely one level above a New York hotel hooker. Dick Suskind, witty friend and co-conspirator, is offered to the public as a self-righteous, sweaty buffoon. The scenes that deal with Movie Clifford feuding with Movie Dick, getting him drunk and hiring a bargirl to seduce him, are totally fictional. The Hughes people mailing the package of files to me is also made up."
