= Richard Suskind =

Children's author

Richard Suskind was a children's author who participated with author Clifford Irving in creating a fraudulent autobiography of the reclusive entrepreneur Howard Hughes. Suskind was incarcerated for five months of a six-month prison sentence for his role in collaborating with Irving on the hoax.

He was portrayed in the 2007 film The Hoax by Alfred Molina.

== Biography ==
Richard Suskind was born in New York City and attended public schools there. In 1943, he joined the Army and served in the 8th Armored Division as a machine gunner in the Battle of the Bulge, in the Netherlands and in Germany. After the war he continued his education on the G.I. Bill in such schools as Columbia University, the University of Florence, the University of Paris, the Juilliard School of Music, and the Paris Conservatory of Music.

In 1948, Suskind served with the Israeli Army during the Arab–Israeli War. He then joined the merchant marine, and in the next two years traveled around the world twice. He spent two years in Italy, five in Paris, and seven years on the Spanish island of Ibiza, part of the Balearic group in the Mediterranean.

A writer since the age of fifteen, Suskind was the author of twelve books and more than one hundred articles and short stories. He was married and had one son.

== Bibliography ==
- 1962 Crusades
- 1964 Do You Want to Live Forever!
- 1967 Cross and Crescent: the Story of the Crusades
- 1968 Men in Armor: the Story of Knights & Knighthood
- 1969 Swords, Spears & Sandals: the Story of the Roman Legions
- 1969 Battle of Belleau Wood; the Marines Stand Fast
- 1970 Barbarians: the Story of the European Tribes
- 1971 Sword of the Prophet: the Story of the Moslem Empire
- 1971 By Bullet, Bomb and Dagger: the Story of Anarchism
- 1973 Crusader King, Richard the Lionhearted

=== Collaboration ===
- 1972 with Clifford Irving: What Really Happened; His untold story of the Hughes Affair, New York: Grove Press.
- As Project Octavio: The Story of the Howard Hughes Hoax, London: Allison & Busby, 1977.
