= Howard R. Hughes Sr. =

American businessman and inventor (1869–1924)

Howard R. Hughes, Sr.
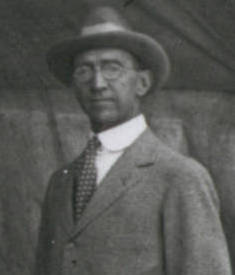
- Hughes in 1917
- Born: Howard Robard Hughes; September 9, 1869; Lancaster, Missouri, U.S.
- Died: January 14, 1924 (aged 54); Houston, Texas, U.S.
- Burial place: Glenwood Cemetery, Houston, Texas; 29.7656°N 95.3852°W
- Education: Missouri Military Academy
- Occupations: Founder of Hughes Tool Company, businessman
- Spouse: Allene Stone Gano (m. 1904; died 1922)
- Children: Howard Robard Hughes Jr. (son)
- Relatives: Rupert Hughes (brother)

Howard Robard Hughes Sr. (September 9, 1869 – January 14, 1924) was an American businessman and inventor who founded the Hughes Tool Company. He invented the "Sharp–Hughes" two-cone rotary drill bit during the Texas Oil Boom. Hughes was the father and namesake of Howard Hughes (Howard Robard Hughes Jr.), the American business tycoon and founder of Hughes Aircraft.

== Early life and education ==
Howard Robard Hughes Sr. was born on September 9, 1869, in Lancaster, Missouri, the son of Jean Amelia (née Summerlin; 1842–1928) and Judge Felix Turner Hughes (1837–1926). Hughes's older sister Greta, better known by her stage name Jeanne Greta, was a grand opera and concert singer. His younger brother, Rupert Hughes, was a famed novelist and screenwriter. Another brother, Felix Jr., was a baritone opera singer. Hughes was a classic entrepreneur, trying and failing at many things before eventually finding success.

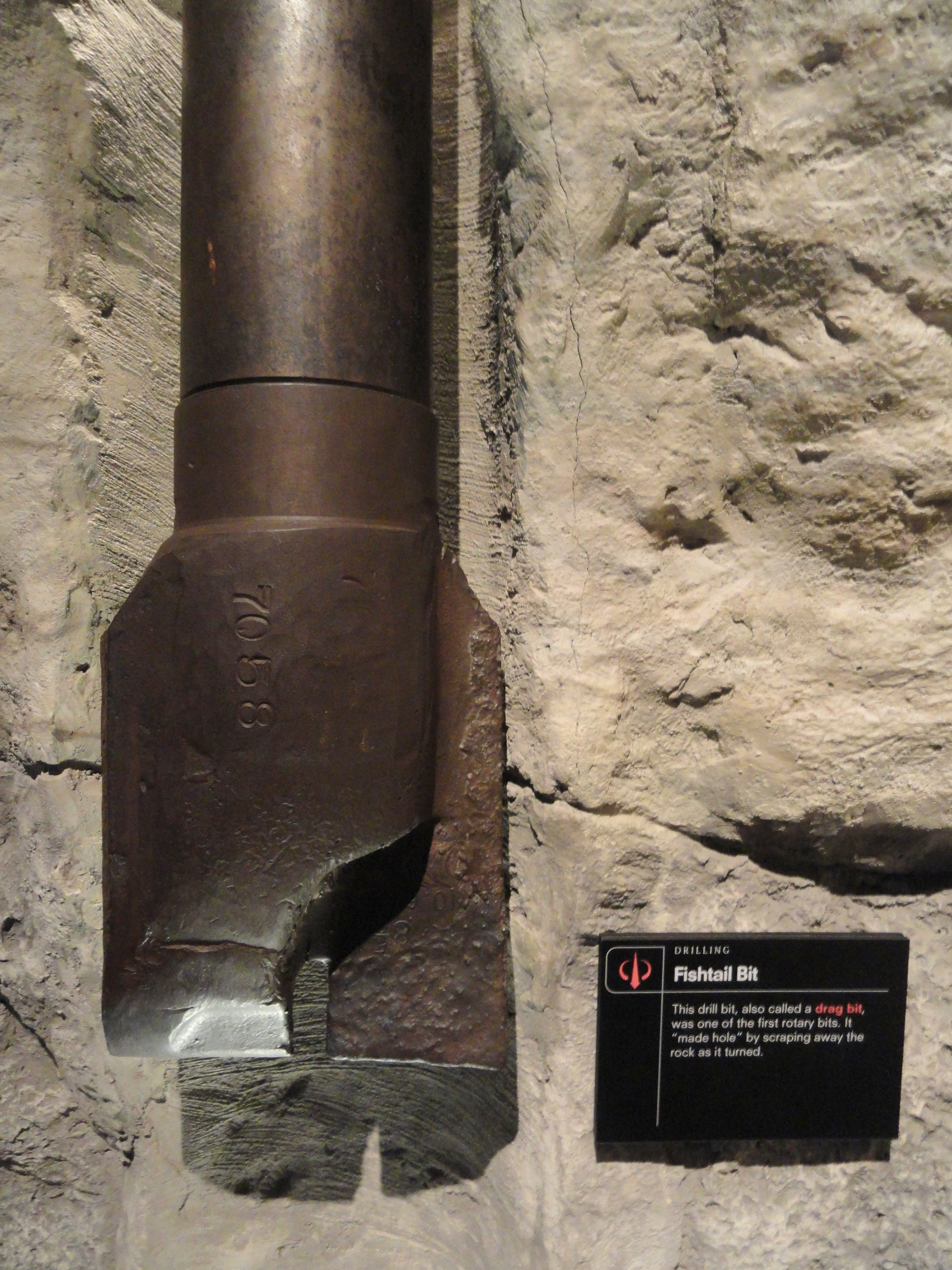
The Fishtail Bit. The drilling technology prior to the patent by Hughes.

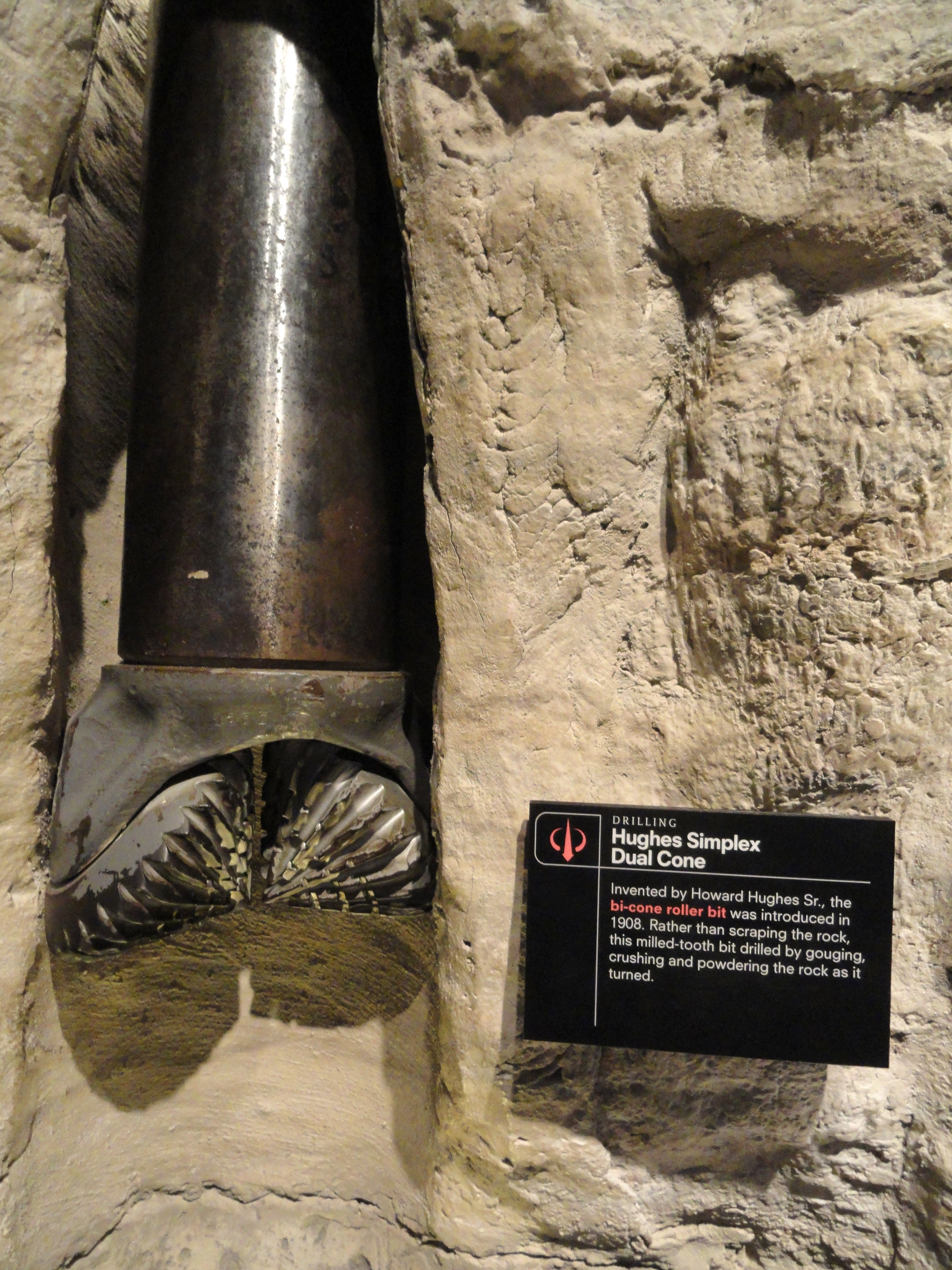
Hughes rotary bi-cone bit.

An advertisement for the Hughes patented technology.

After spending his childhood and early adulthood in Keokuk, Iowa; he lived in various places such as New York City, where he was a member of the Harvard Club; Denver; Joplin, Missouri; and Beaumont, Texas, prior to finally settling in Houston; where his son Howard Jr. was born.

Hughes Sr. was educated at Missouri Military Academy, in Mexico, Missouri. He then entered Harvard University in 1893, dropping out the next year.

After leaving Harvard in '94, I found myself in the Law School of the Iowa State University. It was my father's wish that I succeed him in his practice. Too impatient to await the course of graduation, I passed the examination before the Supreme Court of Iowa and began the practice of law. I soon found the law a too-exacting mistress for a man of my talent, and I quit her between dark and dawn, and have never since been back. I decided to search for my fortune under the surface of the earth.

— Howard Hughes Sr., 1912

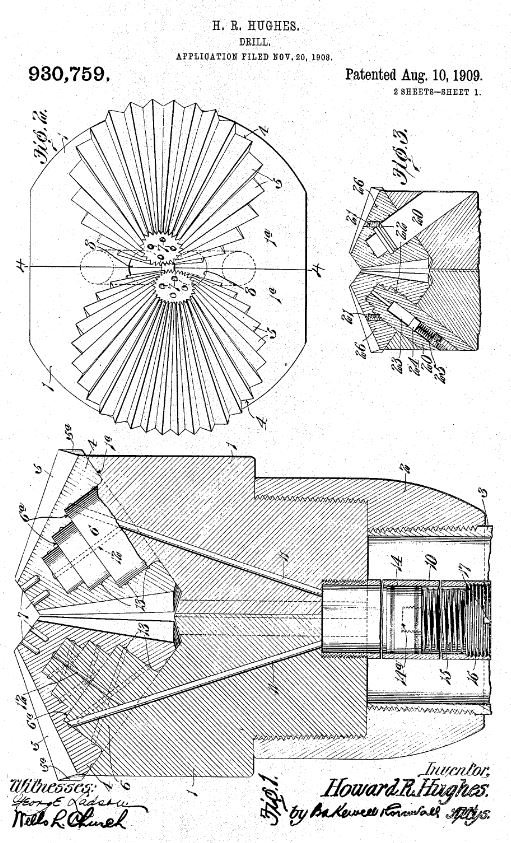
Howard Hughes Sr.'s patent for an oilfield drill bit (1908)

== Career ==
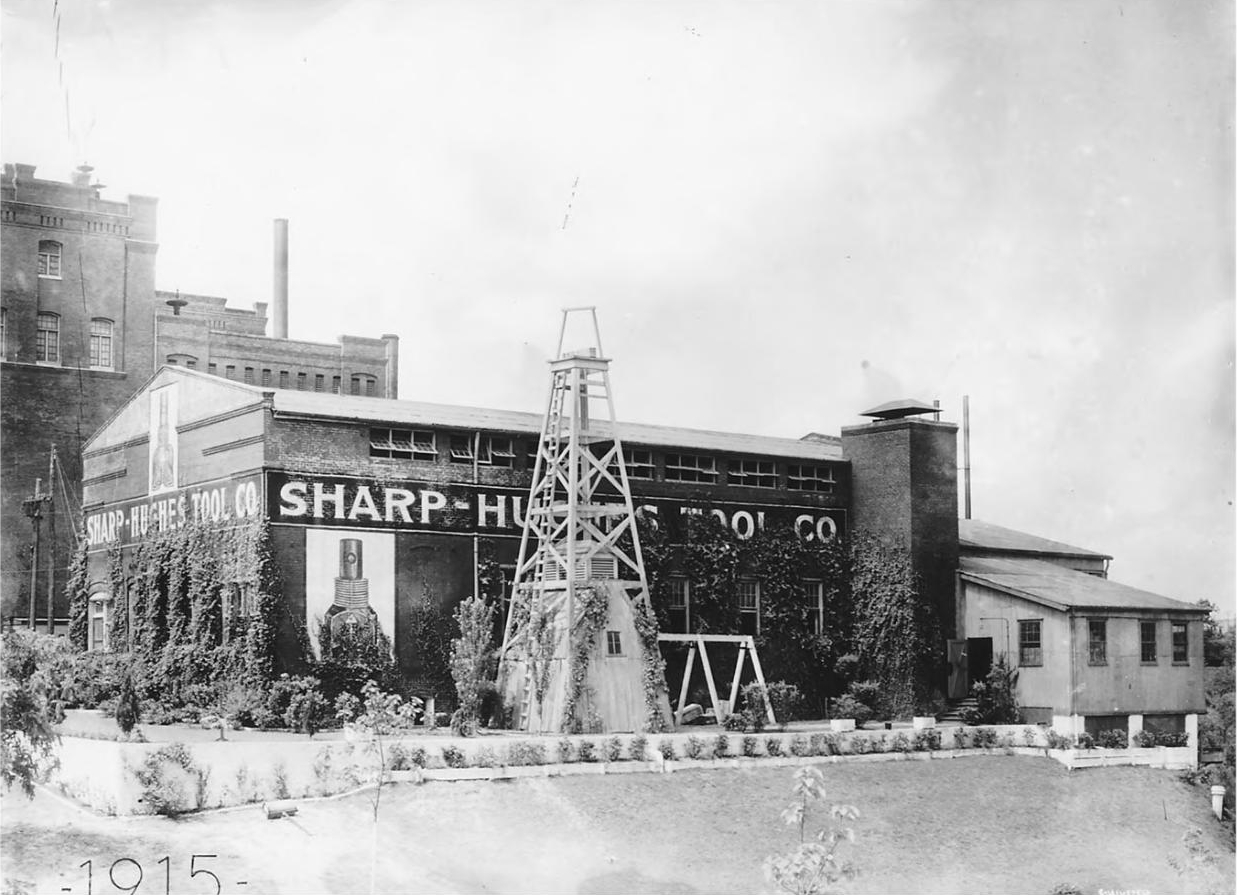
The manufacturing operations of Hughes' Sharp-Hughes Tool Company at 2nd and Girard Streets in Houston, Texas.

Hughes Sr. married Allene Stone Gano, on June 24, 1904, in Dallas County, Texas, and engaged in various mining business endeavors before capitalizing on the Spindletop oil discovery in Texas, as a result of which he began devoting his full time to the oil business. In 1906, Hughes began experiments of ways to replace the state of the art technology at that time, the fishtail bit. (See image)

In 1908, he and Walter Benona Sharp, his business partner, built a two-cone drill bit model using wood. On November 20, 1908, he filed the basic patents for the Sharp-Hughes Rock Bit, and on August 10, 1909, was granted U.S. patent 930,758 and U.S. patent 930,759 for this rock drill. Hughes's two-cone rotary drill bit, nicknamed "rock eater", penetrated medium and hard rock with ten times the speed of any former bit, and its development revolutionized oil well drilling.

It is unlikely that he actually invented the two-cone roller bit, but his legal experience helped him in understanding that its patents were important for capitalizing on the invention. According to the PBS show History Detectives, several other people and companies had produced similar drill bits years earlier. In its initial tests at Goose Creek Oil Field in 1909 where the first offshore drilling for oil in Texas was occurring in Harris County, 21 mi (34 km) southeast of Houston on Galveston Bay, the Sharp-Hughes Rock Bit penetrated in 11 hours 14 ft (4.3 m) of hard rock which no previous equipment had been able to penetrate at all.

During WWI, he invented a tunnel boring machine for soldiers to create tunnels from their trenches.

He co-founded the Sharp-Hughes Tool Company with Walter Benona Sharp in 1909, and after Sharp's death in 1912, took over management. Hughes began purchasing the Sharp stock immediately and by 1918 had acquired full ownership of the company. The essential assets of Hughes Tool Company, as it was renamed, were August 10, 1909, patents for his dual-cone rotary drill bit. The fees for licensing this technology were the basis of Hughes Tool's revenues, and by 1914 the dual-cone roller bit was used in eleven U.S. states and in thirteen foreign countries. Hughes himself whimsically remarked that one of his "fond plans" was to "drill the deepest well in the world", comparing his quest to the Earth's center to Amundsen's South Pole expedition and Robert Peary's North Pole expeditions.

== Awards and accolades ==
100 years after the Hughes drill bit had been patented, the American Society of Mechanical Engineers (ASME) designated the technology a Historic Mechanical Engineering Landmark on August 10, 2009.

== Patents ==
Inventions
Device	Year Patented	Inventor(s)	Assignee	Nations Patents Issued from
Improvements in Drill Heads	1910	Howard R. Hughes	Howard R. Hughes	Great Britain
Roller-drill	1911	Howard R. Hughes	Individual	U.S.
Roller Rotary Drill	1912	Howard R. Hughes	Individual	Austria
Extension Roller Drill	1914	Howard R. Hughes	Individual	Austria
Roller Boring-drill	1914	Howard R. Hughes	Individual	U.S.
Improvements in Roller Boring Drills.	1914	Howard R. Hughes	Individual	Great Britain
Rotary Drills	1915	Howard R. Hughes	Individual	Austria
Improved Method of Sapping or Destroying Military Trenches Blasting and the Like.	1917	Howard R. Hughes	Individual	Great Britain
Improvements in or relating to Drilling Machines.	1917	Howard R. Hughes	Individual	Great Britain
Improvements in the Method of and Apparatus for Forming and Enlarging Bore Holes.	1917	Howard R. Hughes	Individual	Great Britain
Improvements in the construction of perforating machines used for drilling horizontal holes.	1919	Howard R. Hughes	Individual	France
Improvements to the Process and the Apparatus for Drilling and Widening Boreholes.	1919	Howard R. Hughes	Individual	France
Rotary Earth Boring Drill	1923	Howard R. Hughes, Charles Kuldell Rudolph	Hughes Tools, Inc.	Canada

== Death and legacy ==
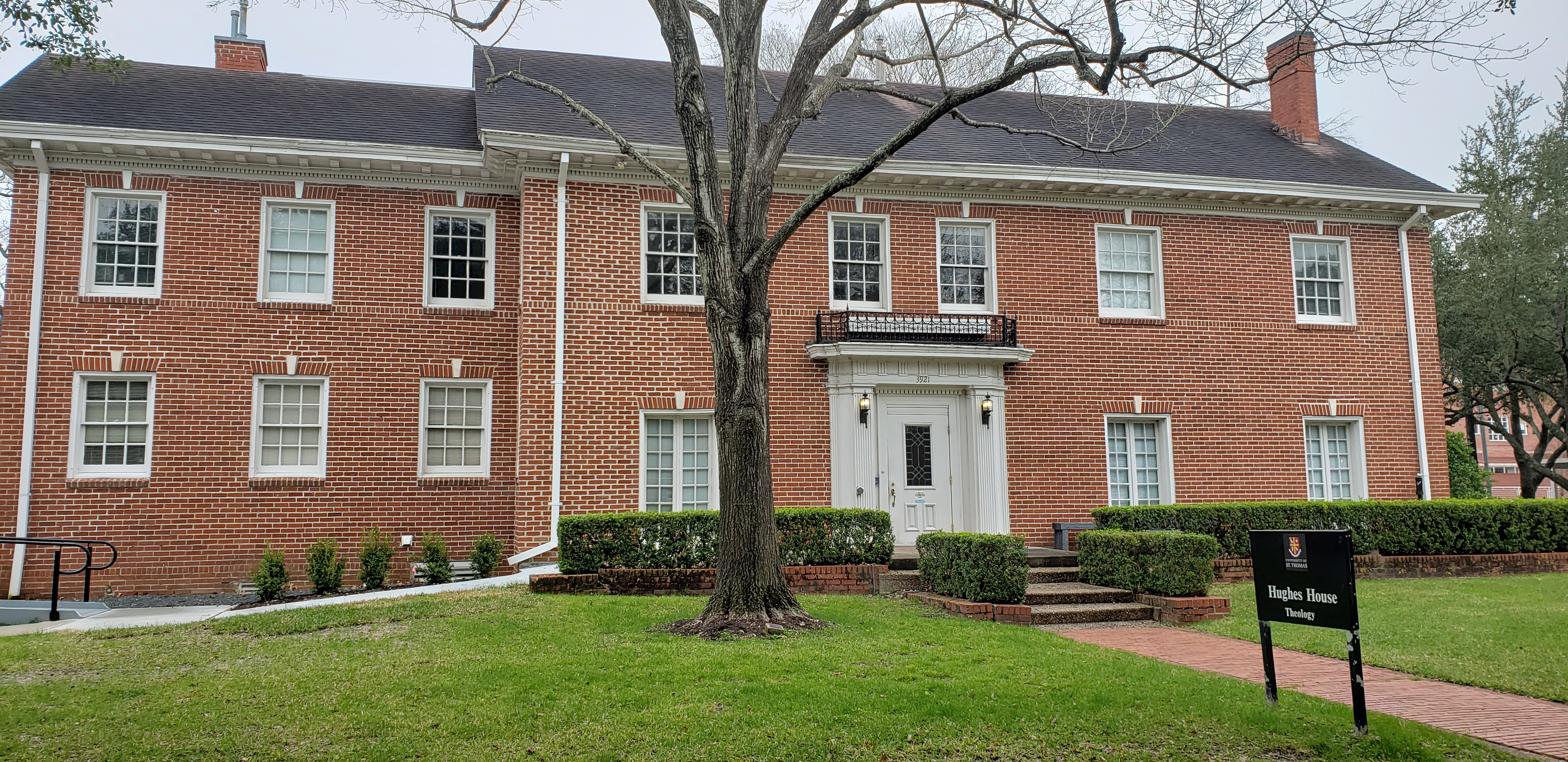
Hughes House

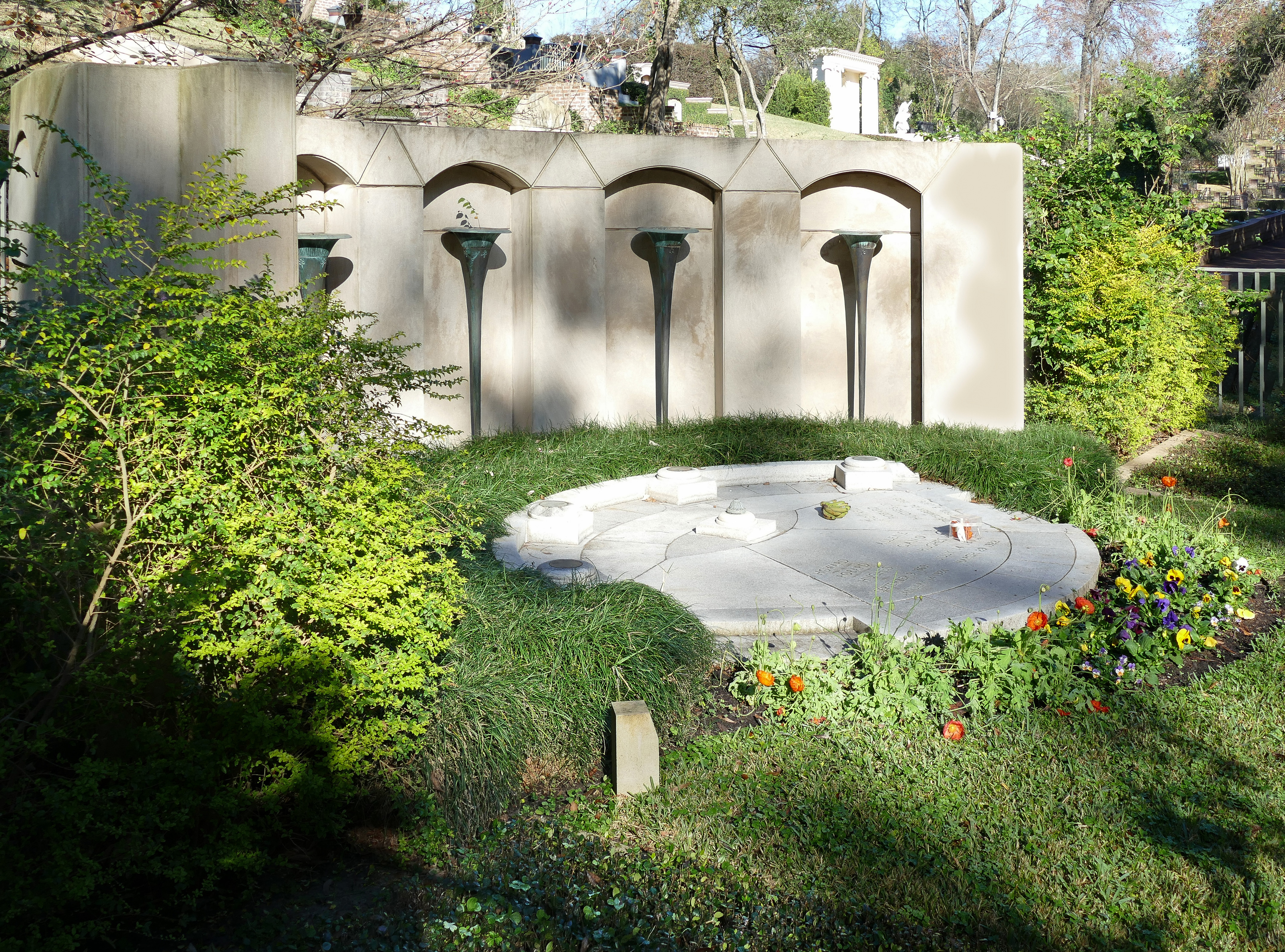
The Hughes family gravesite at Glenwood Cemetery in Houston.

On January 14, 1924, Hughes Sr. died of a heart attack caused by an embolism at his company's offices on the fifth floor of the Humble Oil Building in Houston at the age of 54. After his death, his only child, Howard Jr., assumed control of the company as its 75% owner at the age of 19. In his will, Hughes Sr. had left the remaining 25% to his parents, Felix Sr. and Mimi, and his brother Felix Jr. A little more than a year after his father's death, Hughes Jr. had himself declared an adult (the age of majority at the time being 21) and bought out his grandparents and uncle for full control of Hughes Tool Company. The next year in 1925, Hughes Jr. appointed Noah Dietrich as CEO of Hughes Tool while he himself left for California to pursue filmmaking and aviation.

In 1933, Hughes Tool engineers created a tri-cone rotary drill bit, and from 1934 to 1951 Hughes's market share approached 100%. The Sharp-Hughes Rock Bit found virtually all the oil discovered during the initial years of rotary drilling, and Hughes Jr. became one of the wealthiest people in the world from its revenues. Returning to play a more central role in Hughes Tool in the 1940s, Hughes Jr. diversified the company's holdings by expanding into filmmaking, aviation, and the casino industry in Las Vegas, although his father's core tool manufacturing business remained by far the company's chief source of revenue. In 1972, by which time Hughes Tool had become widely diversified, Hughes Jr. sold the nucleus tool division and realized $150 million from the sale. In 1987, Hughes Tool merged with Baker International to form Baker Hughes, a large oilfield services company still based in Houston.

== See also ==
- List of people from Missouri
