= Walter Benona Sharp =

American businessman, oil drilling pioneer (1870–1912)

Walter Benona Sharp (12 December 1870 - 28 November 1912) was an American oilman and innovator in drilling techniques.

== Early life ==
Sharp was born in Tipton County, Tennessee to James R. and Amanda Forrest Sharp. His mother died when he was eight and his father moved the family to Texas.

== Career ==
Sharp-Hughes Tool Company advertisement in Fuel Oil Journal (1914)

By the age of twenty, Sharp was operating a water well drilling company with his brother. He began drilling oil wells in 1893, although his first attempt was unsuccessful due to quicksand. Later innovations by Sharp would allow drilling through these surfaces in 1901. Sharp also developed the Sharp-Hughes Rock Bit to drill through hard rock.

Sharp made his fortune from the trading of leases and contracting for oil wells.

In 1902, Sharp, Ed Prather, and Howard Hughes Sr., founded the Moonshine Oil Company. In 1905, Producers Oil, a Texaco affiliate, bought Moonshine Oil.

Sharp was also co-founder of the Sharp-Hughes Tool Company, which was renamed the Hughes Tool Company on Sharp's death in 1912 after Sharp's widow Estelle sold her shares to Hughes.

Sharp had three children, Walter Bedford, Kathleen (who died in early childhood), and Dudley Crawford Sharp, who was later Secretary of the Air Force under President Eisenhower.

== Personal life ==
Sharp married Estelle Boughton on 28 January 1897. The couple had three children.

== Death ==
Sharp died on 28 November 1912, at the age of 42, possibly due to being overworked as a result of sustained and strenuous work while fighting an oil fire.
