= Jay Irving =

American cartoonist

Jay Irving with his collection of police memorabilia dating back 300 years. He is wearing a vintage uniform with a Pottsy sergeant badge and holding an ivory and rosewood dress baton.

Jay Irving (October 3, 1900 – June 3, 1970) was an American cartoonist notable for his syndicated strip Pottsy about an overweight, goodnatured, dutiful New York police officer, Pottsy, who often came into conflict with his stricter and less imaginative sergeant, known only as "Sarge."

Born in New York, Irving became familiar with police procedures and activities at an early age when his father, Abraham Rafsky, was a lieutenant in the New York Police Department. After attending Columbia University, Irving was employed as an insurance salesman for New York Life and a police reporter for the New York Globe.

== Cartoons ==
A self-taught artist, Irving became a cartoonist in the late 1920s. He drew the strip Bozo Blimp for King Features Syndicate and spent two years doing advertising art. Dorothy Prago and Jay Irving married in 1922, and their only child, Clifford Irving, was born November 5, 1930. Clifford Irving said about his father, "He didn’t want the family to know he was a cartoonist - they thought he was a 'respectable' insurance salesman - and he also felt that it would be a handicap to use his real name because of widespread antisemitism in the cartoon business. For a decade he kept his work a secret from the family and his real name a secret from the professional cartoon world. He drew under the name Jay Irving, which was derived from his real name, Irving Joel Rafsky. Then, in 1937, when he felt he was sufficiently successful, he confessed, and changed his name legally."

In 1932, Irving began a 13-year association with Collier's, drawing the weekly cartoon panel Collier's Cops. He also did covers for Collier's, including the famous Halloween cover for the October 26, 1940 issue.

In 1946, he created the short-lived comic strip Willie Doodle, also about a fat and cheerful police officer, for the Herald-Tribune Syndicate.

== Pottsy ==
His Pottsy strip was syndicated by the Tribune-News Syndicate from 1955 until 1970. Irving's son, Clifford, was an art student in the mid-1940s at the High School of Music & Art, and he assisted his father by doing lettering on both Willie Doodle and Pottsy. Clifford Irving later wrote about the art world in his notable biography Fake! The Story of Elmyr de Hory, the Greatest Art Forger of Our Time (1969).

The word "Pottsy" entered the language during the run of the strip. A police officer who prevented the loss of his badge by wearing a fake badge referred to the fake as a Pottsy. Later, these fake badges became known as "dupes".

== Television ==
Irving and younger cartoonist friend Mel Casson were regular performers on the ABC television series Draw Me a Laugh (1949), which the two men jointly produced. The show was hosted by Patricia Bright and Walter Hurley. Guest cartoonists included Gus Edson. Viewers sent in ideas which were drawn by the cartoonists while members of the studio audience created the gag lines. Folk singer Oscar Brand then vocalized the "singing captions".

The show lasted only 13 weeks and proved to be a financial disaster from which Irving, who had borrowed money to pay for the production, never really recovered.

Irving was 69 when he died of a heart attack in his Manhattan apartment at 650 West End Avenue. His bedridden wife Dorothy survived him by less than a year. He was also survived by his son, the novelist Clifford Irving; a brother, John Norman; and two sisters, Bebe Hamilburg and Mabel Rosenthal.

== National Cartoonists Society ==
Irving was a founding member of the National Cartoonists Society, although his name is curiously absent from the organization's online roster of members. He was the official historian for the Police Department's Honor Legion, and he owned a unique collection of police memorabilia dating back more than 300 years.
