= Clifford Irving =

American author and investigative reporter

- Irving in 1977
- Born: Clifford Michael Irving; November 5, 1930; New York City, U.S.
- Died: December 19, 2017 (aged 87); Sarasota, Florida, U.S.
- Education: Cornell University
- Occupations: Novelist, investigative reporter
- Spouses: Nina Wilcox (m. 1952, annulled) Claire Lydon (m. 1958; died 1959) Fay Desch (m. 1962; div. 1965) Edith Sommer (m. 1967, divorced) Maureen Earl (m. 1984; div. 1998) Julie Schall (m. 1998)
- Children: 3
- Writing career
- Years active: 1956–2015

Clifford Michael Irving (November 5, 1930 – December 19, 2017) was an American novelist and investigative reporter. Although he published 20 novels, he is best known for an "autobiography" allegedly written as told to Irving by billionaire recluse Howard Hughes. The fictional work was to have been published in 1972. After Hughes denounced him and sued the publisher, McGraw-Hill, Irving and his collaborators confessed to the hoax. He was sentenced to two and a half years in prison for fraud, of which he served 17 months.

Irving later wrote The Hoax (1981), his account of events surrounding the development and sale of the fake autobiography. The book was adapted as a 2006 biopic of the same name starring Richard Gere as Clifford Irving. He continued to write and publish books, including his prison journal.

== Early life and writing career ==
Irving grew up in a Jewish household in New York City, the son of Jay Irving, a Collier's cover artist and the creator of the syndicated comic strip Pottsy, and his wife, Dorothy. After graduating in 1947 from Manhattan's selective High School of Music and Art, Irving attended Cornell University. He graduated with honors in English.

Working as a copy boy at The New York Times, Irving wrote his first novel, On a Darkling Plain (1956), published by Putnam.

Irving completed his second novel, The Losers (1958), while traveling in Europe. His third novel, The Valley (1960), is a mythic Western saga, published by McGraw-Hill.

After returning to Ibiza, Irving became friendly with Hungarian art forger Elmyr de Hory. The painter asked him to write a biography, which was published as Fake! (1969). Irving and de Hory are both featured in Orson Welles's film documentary, F for Fake (1974), which was inspired by both Fake! and the Hughes autobiography affair.

== Personal life ==
Irving's first wife was Nina Wilcox. Their marriage was annulled in 1952. Later, on the Spanish island of Ibiza, he met an Englishwoman, Claire Lydon; they married in 1958 and moved to California. She died the following year at Big Sur in a car crash on May 8, 1959.

In 1962, after a year spent traveling around the world and living in a houseboat in Kashmir, Irving moved back to Ibiza with his third wife, Fay Desch, an English photographic model, and their newborn son, Josh. This marriage ended in divorce. In 1967, Irving married Swiss/German artist Edith Sommer. They had two sons, John Edmond (aka "Nedsky") and Barnaby. He reportedly had a lengthy affair in the 1970s with the Danish actress and singer Nina van Pallandt.

Irving later married English author Maureen "Moish" Earl. From 1984 to 1998, they lived mainly in the mountain town of San Miguel de Allende, Guanajuato, Mexico. After divorcing Earl, Irving married an Australian woman, Julie Schall.

== Fake autobiography of Howard Hughes ==
By 1958, millionaire Howard Hughes had become a recluse. In 1970, in Palma de Mallorca, Spain, Irving met with Richard Suskind, a longtime friend who was an author of children's books. They conceived a scheme to write Hughes's purported "autobiography": Irving and Suskind believed that, because Hughes had completely withdrawn from public life, he would never draw attention by denouncing such a book or filing a lawsuit for libel.

Suskind took on the work of research in news archives. Irving started by enlisting the aid of artist and writer friends on Ibiza in order to forge letters in Hughes's own hand, imitating authentic letters they had seen displayed in Newsweek magazine.

Irving contacted his publisher, McGraw-Hill, and said that Hughes had corresponded with him, saying he admired Irving's book about de Hory, and that Hughes had expressed interest in having Irving ghost write the millionaire's autobiography.

The McGraw-Hill editors invited Irving to New York, where the publishers drafted contracts among Hughes, Irving, and the company, with Irving and his friends forging Hughes' signatures. McGraw-Hill paid an advance of US$100,000, with an additional US$400,000 to be paid to Hughes; Irving later bargained the sum up to US$765,000. McGraw-Hill paid by checks made out to "H. R. Hughes", which Irving's Swiss wife Edith deposited to a Swiss bank account that she had opened under the name of "Helga R. Hughes".

On December 7, 1971, McGraw-Hill announced that they would be publishing the book.

=== The investigation ===
Learning of the planned book, representatives of Hughes' companies expressed doubts about its authenticity. Frank McCulloch, known for years as the last journalist to interview Hughes, had received an angry call from someone claiming to be Hughes, but after he read the Irving manuscript, became convinced that the book was genuine.

McGraw-Hill and Life magazine, which had paid to publish excerpts of the book, continued to support Irving. Osborn Associates, a firm of handwriting experts, further declared the writing samples were authentic. While Irving had to submit to a lie-detector test, this indicated inconsistencies but no lies.

On January 7, 1972, Hughes arranged a telephone conference with seven journalists whose end of the conversation was televised: in this conference, Hughes claimed that he had never even met Irving, much less corresponded with him.

Hughes' lawyer, Chester Davis, immediately filed suit against McGraw-Hill, Life, Clifford Irving, and Dell Publications, while Swiss authorities investigated the "Helga R. Hughes" bank account: the Irvings by this time had returned to their home on the Balearic island of Ibiza. The bank account was opened under Irving’s wife with a fake passport.

=== Confession and trial ===
The Irvings confessed on January 28, 1972. They and Suskind were indicted for "conspiracy to defraud through use of the mails" and pleaded guilty on June 16. Irving spent 17 months in prison. He voluntarily returned the US$765,000 advance to his publishers. Edith, a.k.a. "Helga", served prison sentences in the United States and in Switzerland.

== Film ==
In July 2005, filming began in Puerto Rico and New York on The Hoax, starring Richard Gere as Irving, Alfred Molina as Suskind, and Marcia Gay Harden as Edith. On March 6, 2007, Hyperion reissued Clifford Irving's The Hoax in a movie tie-in edition. The film, directed by Swedish filmmaker Lasse Hallström, opened on April 6, 2007, with a DVD release following on October 16. The majority of reviews were favorable.

Irving characterized the film as a clichéd distortion of the story and "a hoax about a hoax". He described the film's portrayals of Suskind, Edith Irving and himself as "absurd even more than inaccurate". He noted that the film was not true to his account, adding events that had not taken place. As the author of the source book, Irving is credited as a writer for the film, but he had himself removed from credit as technical adviser.

In spring 2012, the movie rights to Irving's nonfiction book, Fake!, were optioned by Steve Golin and Anonymous Content LLP. Irving was commissioned to write a screenplay for the movie. In 2015, Anonymous Content's option for the book's dramatic rights expired.

== Later life and death ==
In 2012, Irving formatted and placed 12 of his books, including one unpublished novel, for sale on Kindle and Nook. In 2014, he added six books to the total, including his prison journal. Sales were brisk. Irving was open about it, and offered the text of the hoax autobiography for sale in book form.

Irving died of pancreatic cancer on December 19, 2017, in Sarasota, Florida at the age of 87.

== Legacy ==
In November 2014, the Briscoe Center for American History at the University of Texas announced that they had acquired all of Irving's literary and personal papers. The archive includes material from more than 50 years, from 1954 to 2012. Among the trove is Irving's correspondence with lawyers, publishers, colleagues and friends such as Graham Greene, Robert Graves and Irwin Shaw, his personal diaries and prison journals, many manuscript drafts, legal documents from lawsuits and from his 1972 bankruptcy, portions of his Howard Hughes manuscript and extensive handwritten notes and musings. It fills 20 boxes in the research center archive.

Don Carleton, executive director at the Briscoe Center, remarked of Clifford Irving that he was "an important writer who has lived a colorful and controversial life, which has been a major source of inspiration for much of his literary work". He also said that he was "delighted that his papers are now available to enrich scholarship here at the university".

== Bibliography ==
Books

- On a Darkling Plain (1956) (also published in Canada as The Quick and the Loving)
- The Losers (1958)
- The Valley (1960)
- The 38th Floor (1965)
- The Battle of Jerusalem (1967)
- Spy (1968)
- Fake: The Story of Elmyr de Hory: The Greatest Art Forger of Our Time (1969)
- Autobiography of Howard Hughes (1971)
- Project Octavio: The Story of the Howard Hughes Hoax (1972) with Richard Suskind
- The Death Freak (1976)
- The Sleeping Spy (1979)
- The Hoax (1981)
- Tom Mix and Pancho Villa (1981)
- The Angel of Zin (1983)
- Trial (1987)
- Daddy's Girl: The Campbell Murder Case A True Tale of Vengeance, Betrayal, and Texas Justice (1988)
- Final Argument (1990)
- The Spring (1995)
- Boy on Trial (2004)
- Clifford Irving's Prison Journal, aka Jailing (2012)
- Bloomberg Discovers America (2012)

Book contributions

- "History's Most Brazen Fakers". Hamilton, Charles. Great Forgers and Famous Fakes: The Manuscript Forgers of America and How They Duped the Experts. New York: Crown Publishers, 1980, pp. 166–171.

== See also ==
- Literary forgery
