= Well drilling =

Method of extracting a natural resource

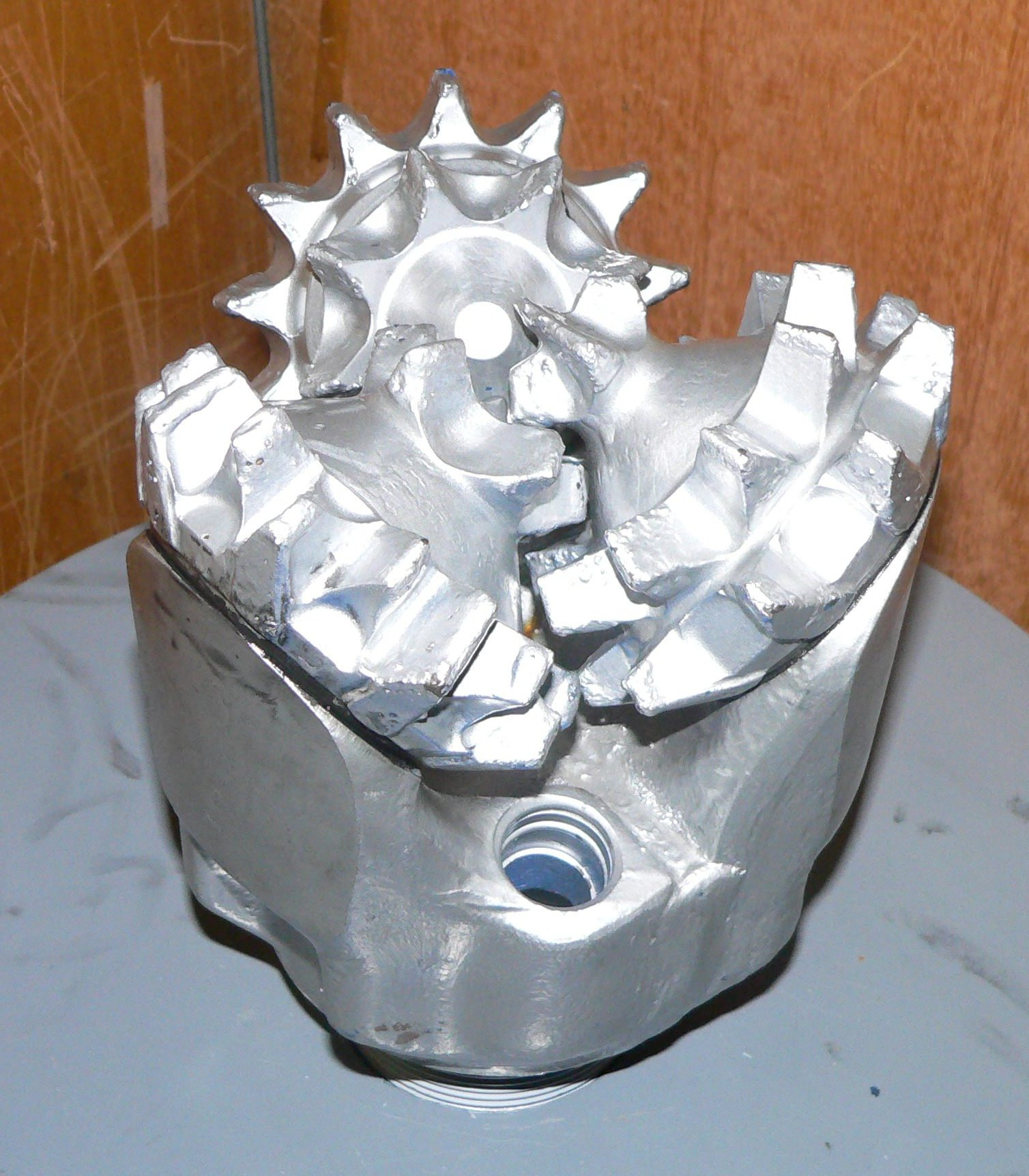
Tricone rock bit

Well drilling is the process of drilling a hole in the ground for the extraction of a natural resource such as ground water, brine, natural gas, or petroleum, for the injection of a fluid from surface to a subsurface reservoir or for subsurface formations evaluation or monitoring. Drilling for the exploration of the nature of the material underground (for instance in search of metallic ore) is best described as 'borehole drilling'.

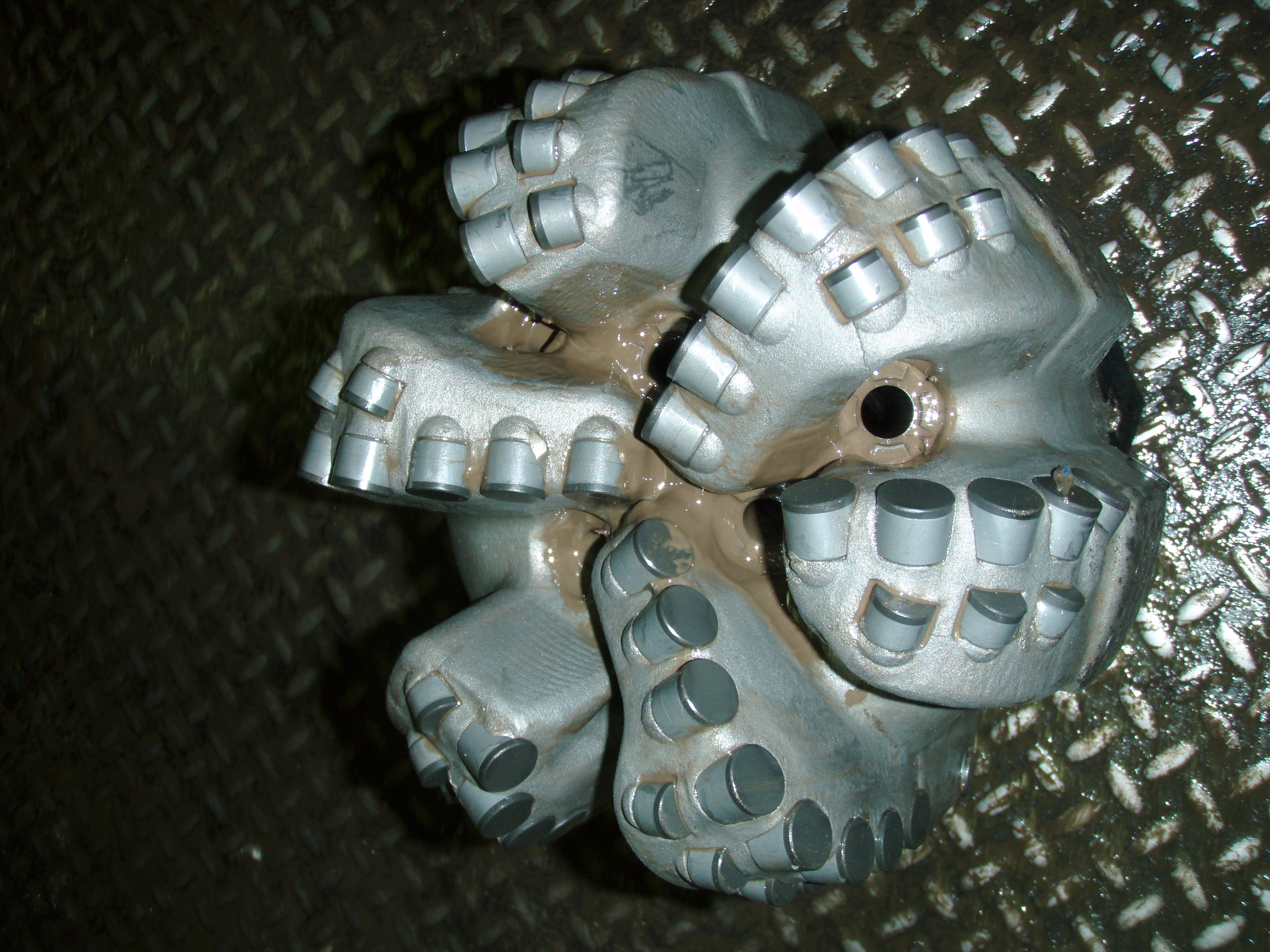
PDC (Polycrystalline Diamond Cutter) Drill Bit

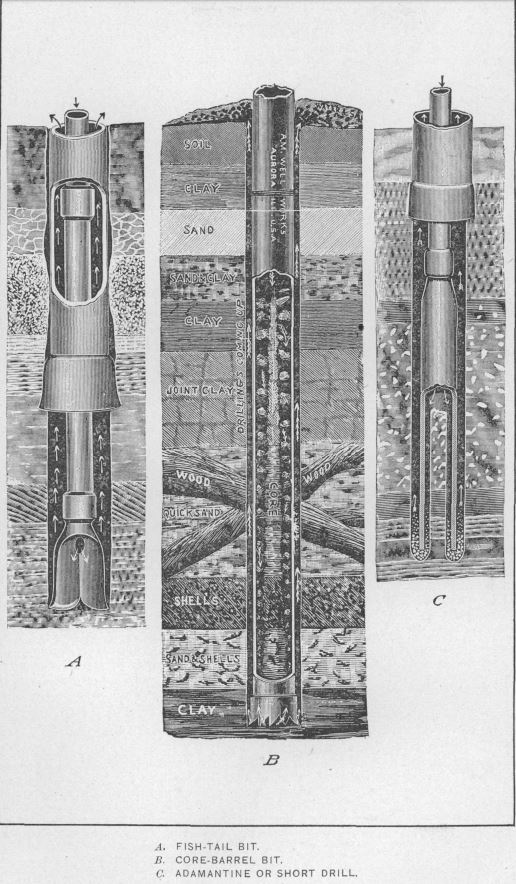
Early rotary drill bits

The earliest wells were water wells, shallow pits dug by hand in regions where the water table approached the surface, usually with masonry or wooden walls lining the interior to prevent collapse. Modern drilling techniques utilize long drill shafts, producing holes much narrower and deeper than could be produced by digging.

Well drilling can be done either manually or mechanically and the nature of required equipment varies from extremely simple and cheap to very sophisticated.

In many jurisdictions, drilling activities are regulated to protect groundwater sources from contamination.

Managed Pressure Drilling (MPD) is defined by the International Association of Drilling Contractors (IADC) as “an adaptive drilling process used to more precisely control the annular pressure profile throughout the wellbore". The objectives of MPD are “to ascertain the downhole pressure environment limits and to manage the annular hydraulic pressure profile accordingly".

== History ==
=== Earliest record ===
The earliest record of well drilling dates from 347 AD in China. Petroleum was used in ancient China for "lighting, as a lubricant for cart axles and the bearings of water-powered drop hammers, as a source of carbon for inksticks, and as a medical remedy for sores on humans and mange in animals." In ancient China, deep well drilling machines were in the forefront of brine well production by the 1st century BC. The ancient Chinese developed advanced sinking wells and were the first civilization to use a well-drilling machine and to use bamboo well casings to keep the holes open.

=== Modern era ===
In the modern era, the first roller cone patent was for the rotary rock bit and was issued to American businessman and inventor Howard Hughes Sr. in 1909. It consisted of two interlocking cones. American businessman Walter Benona Sharp worked very closely with Hughes in developing the rock bit. The success of this bit led to the founding of the Sharp-Hughes Tool Company. In 1933 two Hughes engineers, one of whom was Ralph Neuhaus, invented the tricone bit, which has three cones. The Hughes patent for the tricone bit lasted until 1951, after which other companies made similar bits. However, Hughes still held 40% of the world's drill bit market in 2000. The superior wear performance of polycrystalline diamond compact (PDC) bits gradually eroded the dominance of roller cone bits and early in this century PDC drill bit revenues overtook those of roller cone bits. The technology of both bit types has advanced significantly to provide improved durability and rate of penetration of the rock. This has been driven by the economics of the industry, and by the change from the empirical approach of Hughes in the 1930s, to modern day domain Finite Element codes for both the hydraulic and cutter placement software.

== Drill bits in mechanical drilling ==
The factors affecting drill bit selection include the type of geology and the capabilities of the rig. Due to the high number of wells that have been drilled, information from an adjacent well is most often used to make the appropriate selection. Two different types of drill bits exist: fixed cutter and roller cone. A fixed cutter bit is one where there are no moving parts, but drilling occurs due to shearing, scraping or abrasion of the rock. Fixed cutter bits can be either polycrystalline diamond compact (PDC) or grit hot-pressed inserts (GHI) or natural diamond. Roller cone bits can be either tungsten carbide inserts (TCI) for harder formations or milled tooth (MT) for softer rock. The manufacturing process and composites used in each type of drill bit make them ideal for specific drilling situations. Additional enhancements can be made to any bit to increase the effectiveness for almost any drilling situation.

A major factor in drill bit selection is the type of formation to be drilled. The effectiveness of a drill bit varies by formation type. There are three types of formations: soft, medium and hard. A soft formation includes unconsolidated sands, clays, soft limestones, red beds and shale. Medium formations include dolomites, limestones, and hard shale. Hard formations include hard shale, calcites, mudstones, cherty lime stones and hard and abrasive formations.

Until 2006, market share was divided primarily among Hughes Christensen, Security-DBS (Halliburton Drill Bits and Services), Smith Bits (a subsidiary of Schlumberger), and ReedHycalog (acquired by National Oilwell Varco in 2008).

By 2014, Ulterra (then a subsidiary of ESCO Corp.) and Varel International (a subsidiary of Swedish engineering group Sandvik) had together gained nearly 30% of the U.S. bit market and eroded the historical dominance of the Smith, Halliburton, and Baker Hughes. By 2018, Schlumberger, which acquired Smith in 2010, became dominant in international markets thanks to packaging drill bits with their other tools and services, while Ulterra (owned by private equity firms Blackstone Energy Partners and American Securities) continued a Stark growth trend, becoming the market share leader in drill bits in the US according to Spears Research and Kimberlite Research.

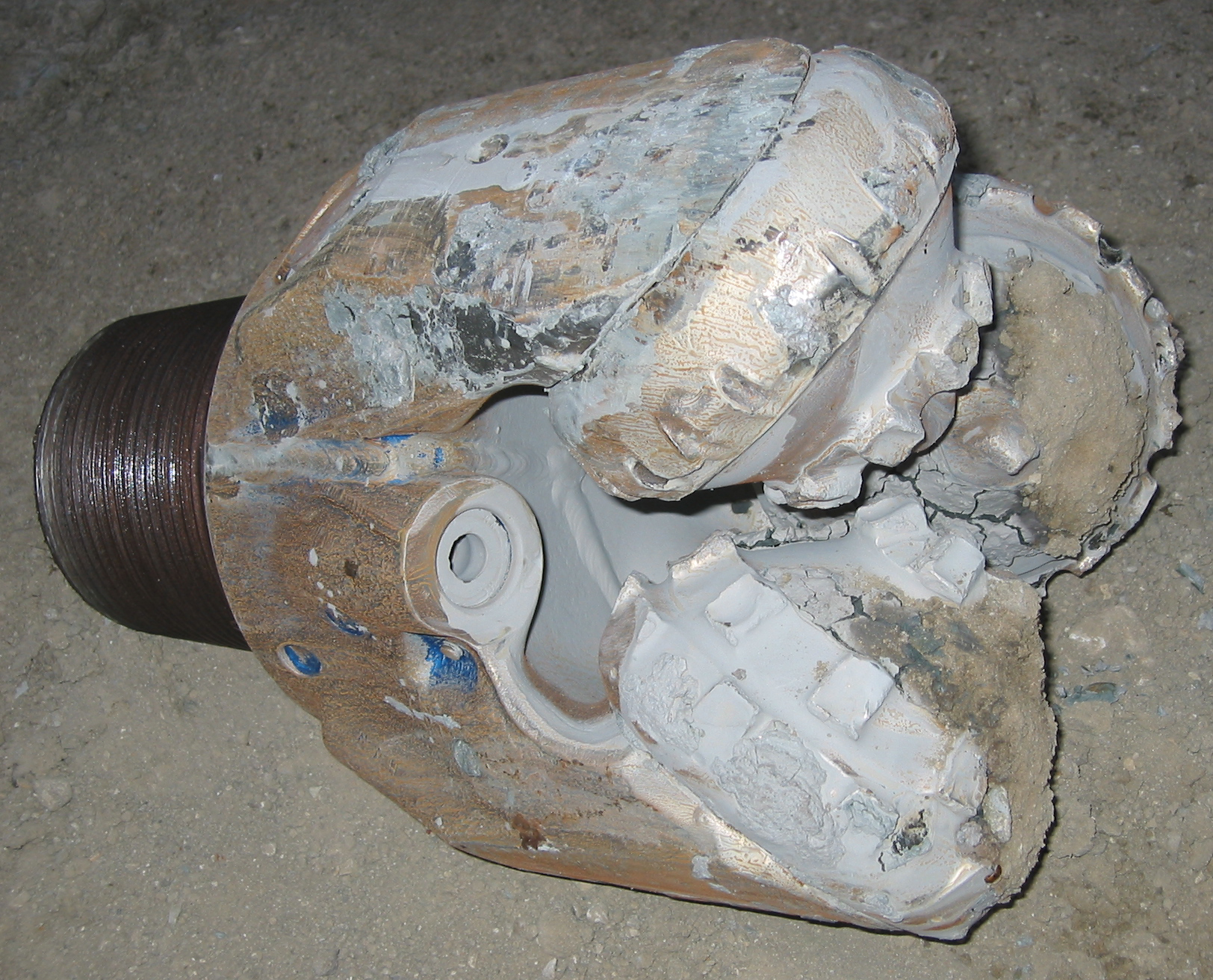
Tricone bit for well drilling (medium worn-out)

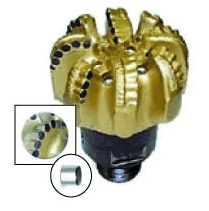
PDC bit for well drilling

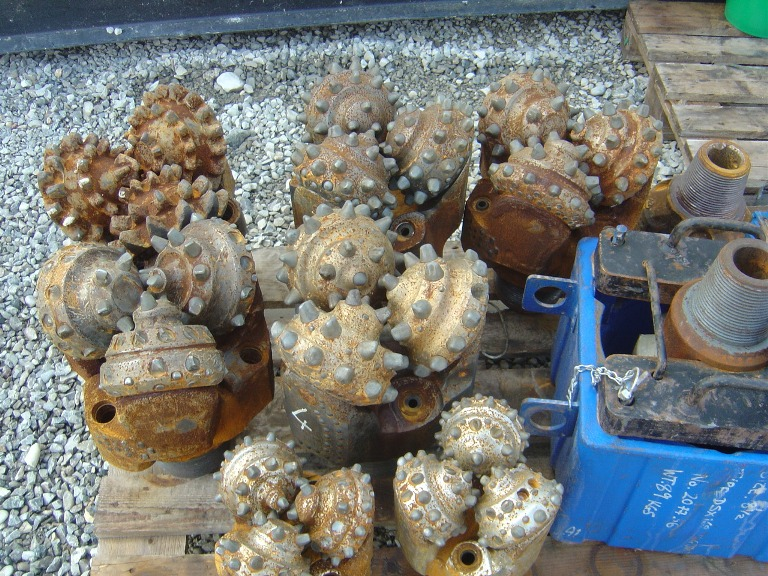
Multiple Tricone Bits

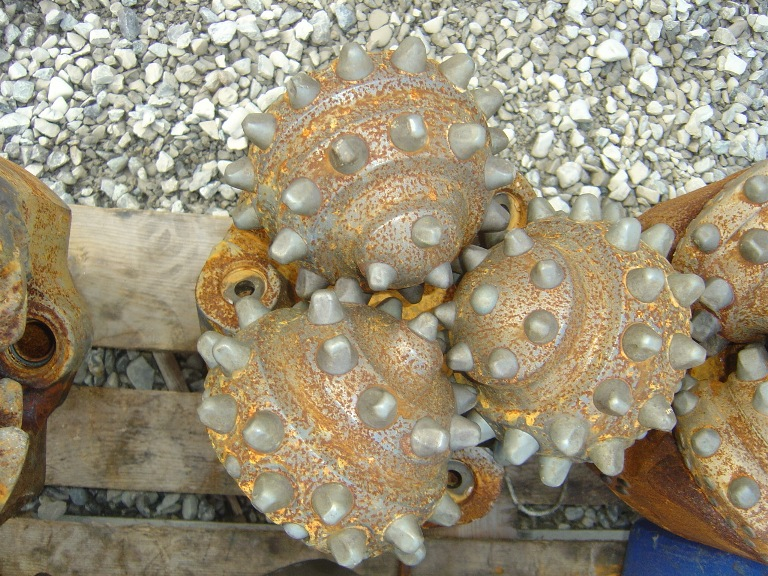
Tricone Bit

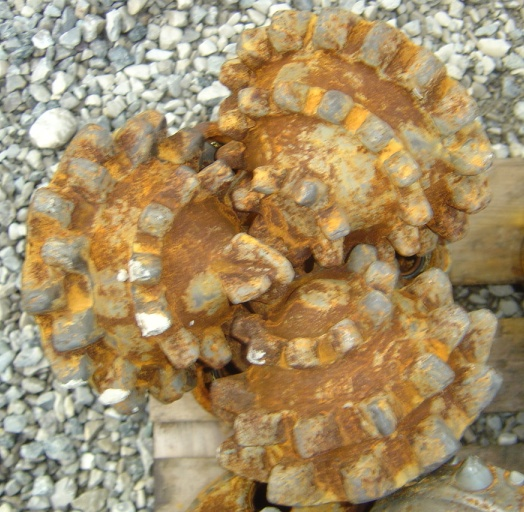
Drill Bit

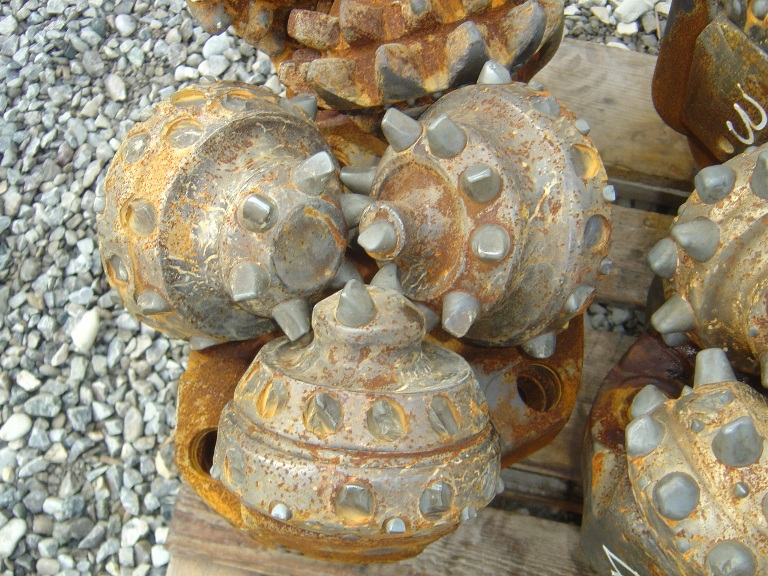
Damaged Drill Bit, pieces missing on the left hand cone

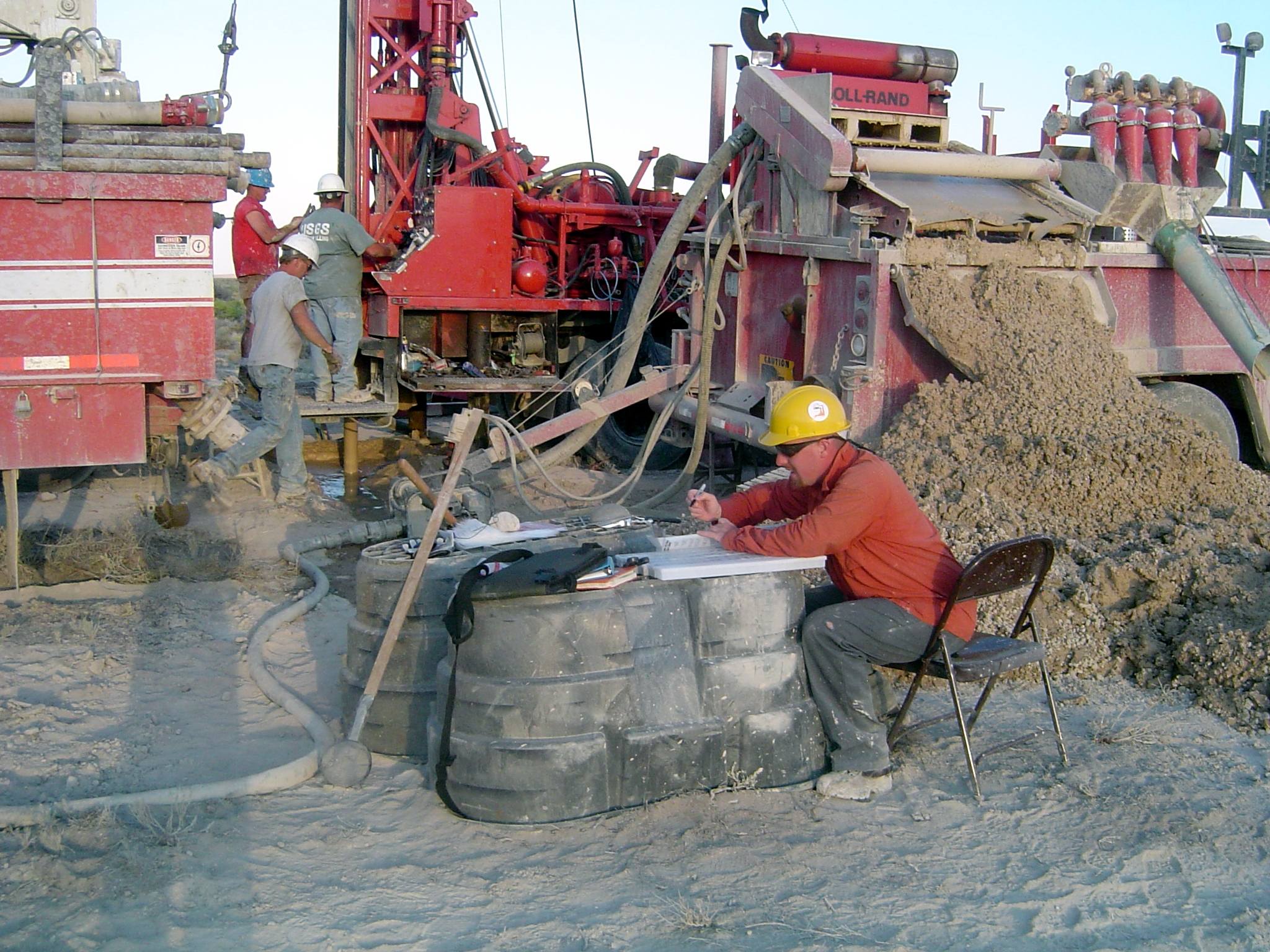
Mud log in process, a common way to study the lithology when drilling oil wells

Evaluation of the dull bit grading is done by a uniform system promoted by the International Association of Drilling Contractors (IADC). See Society of Petroleum Engineers / IADC Papers SPE 23938 & 23940. See also PDC Bits

== See also ==
- Blowout (well drilling)
- Borehole
- Deep well drilling
- Driller (oil)
- Drilling mud
- Drilling rig
- Slickline
- Underbalanced drilling
- Water well

Manual well drilling methods

- Baptist well drilling
- Sludging

== Bibliography ==
- Australian Drilling Industry Training Committee Ltd (1996). Drilling: the manual of methods, applications and management (4th ed.). CRC Press. ISBN 978-1-56670-242-3.
