= Water supply and sanitation in Grenada =

Data
- Access to an improved water source: 87% (2009)

Institutions
- National water and sanitation company: National Water and Sewerage Authority (NAWASA)

In 2015, in Grenada, 97% of the total population had access to "improved" water, 99% in urban areas and 95% in rural areas. In the same year, 98% had access to "improved" sanitation, 98% both in urban and rural areas. Nevertheless, there were still, in 2015, around 4 thousand people without access to "improved" water and around 2 thousand without access to "improved" sanitation.

"About 52 percent of the population receives private water service, 23 percent uses public standpipes, and 23 percent use rain water catchments, private springs, streams or ponds. Presently there are 29 water supply facilities in the country."

As of 2013, Grenada had a US$6.9 million pilot project to adapt its irrigation system to climate change and conduct local and regional water planning, funded by the German International Climate Initiative (IKI). Groundwater depletion, lower water tables, disruption of water supply by hurricanes (such as Hurricane Ivan), saltwater intrusion, and rising sea levels pose challenges for providing a consistent water supply for agriculture and tourism.

As of 2013, a rainwater collection system was under construction in one of the two villages without pipe-borne water.
