= Improved water source =

Water source that is protected from outside contamination

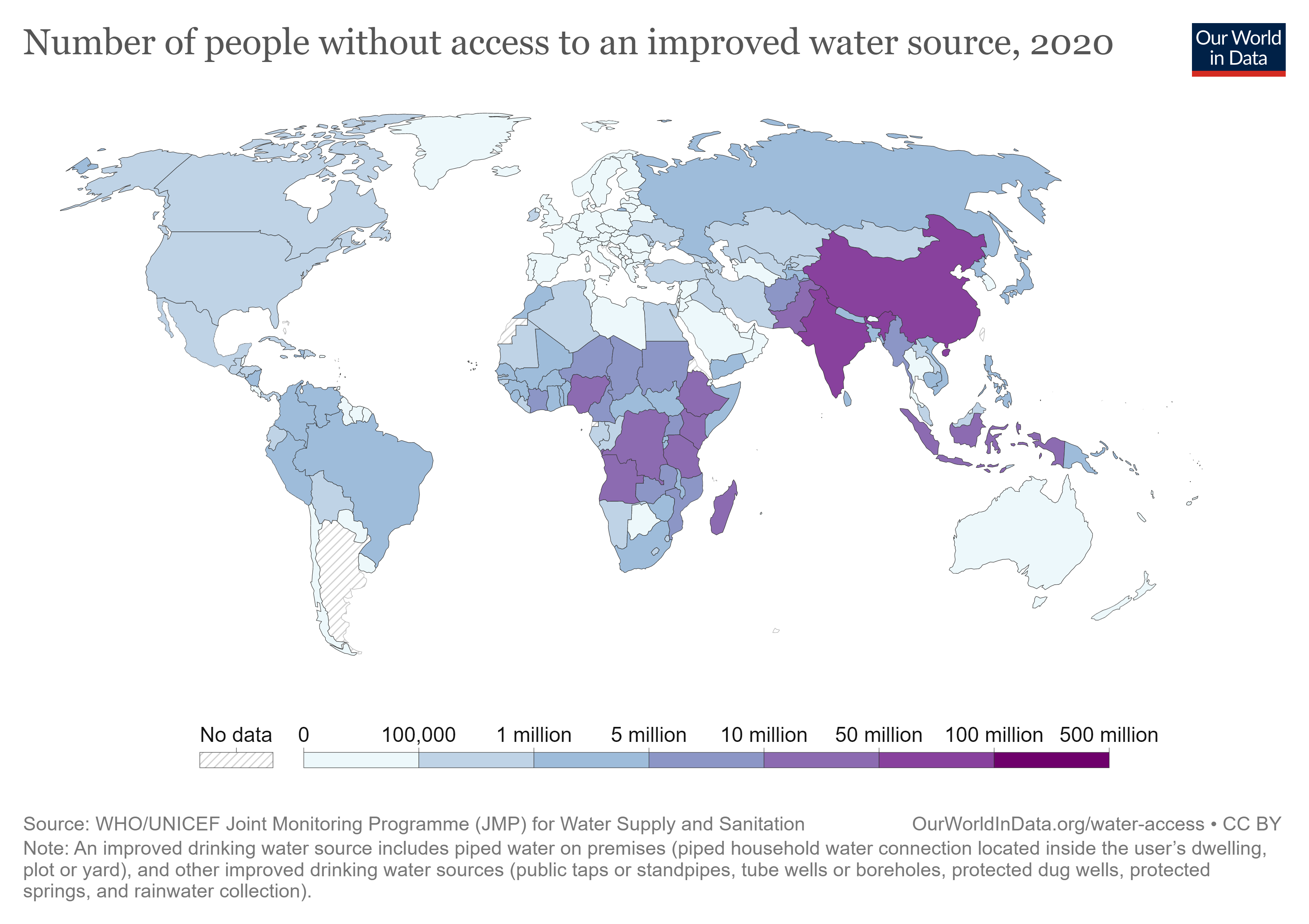
Number of people without access to an improved water source, 2020

An improved water source (or improved drinking-water source or improved water supply) is a term used to categorize certain types or levels of water supply for monitoring purposes. It is defined as a type of water source that, by nature of its construction or through active intervention, is likely to be protected from outside contamination, in particular from contamination with fecal matter.

The term was coined by the Joint Monitoring Program (JMP) for Water Supply and Sanitation of UNICEF and WHO in 2002 to help monitor the progress towards Goal Number 7 of the Millennium Development Goals (MDGs). The opposite of "improved water source" has been termed "unimproved water source" in the JMP definitions.

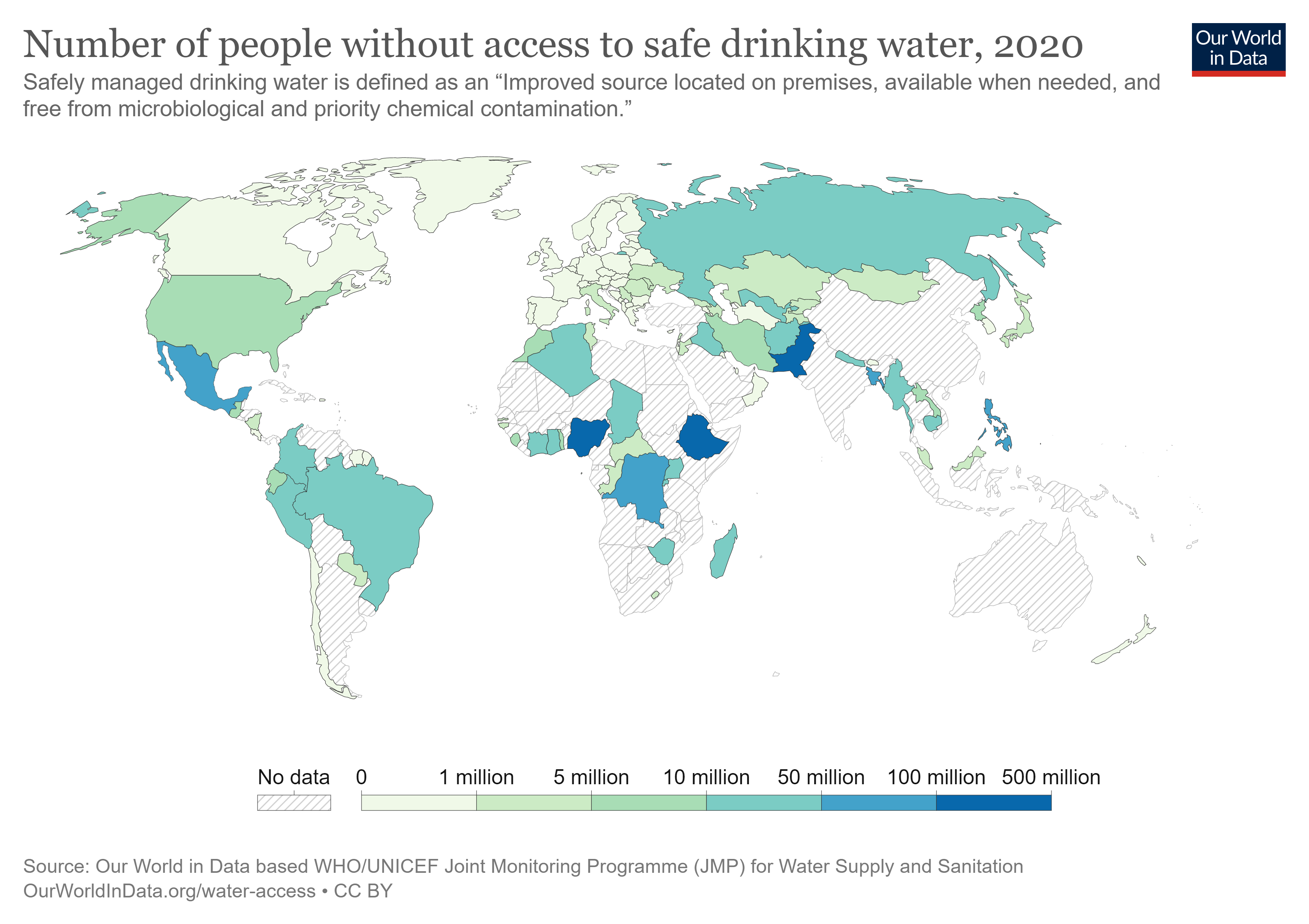
World map for SDG 6 Indicator 6.1.1 in 2020: "Proportion of population using safely managed drinking water services".

The same terms are used to monitor progress towards Sustainable Development Goal 6 (Target 6.1, Indicator 6.1.1) from 2015 onwards. Here, they are a component of the definition for "safely managed drinking water service".

== Definitions ==
=== During SDG period (2015 to 2030) ===
Indicator 6.1.1 of SDG 6 is "Proportion of population using safely managed drinking water services". The term "safely managed drinking water services" is defined as: "Drinking water from an improved water source that is located on premises, available when needed and free from fecal and priority chemical contamination".

In 2017, the JMP defined a new term: "basic water service". This is defined as the drinking water coming from an improved source, and provided the collection time is not more than 30 minutes for a round trip. A lower level of service is now called "limited water service" which is the same as basic service but the collection time is longer than 30 minutes.

Service levels are defined as (from lowest to highest): Surface water, unimproved, limited, basic, safely managed.

JMP Drinking water ladder
Safely Managed
Basic
Limited
Unimproved
Surface Water

=== During MDG period (2000 until 2015) ===
To allow for international comparability of estimates for monitoring the Millennium Development Goals (MDGs), the World Health Organization/UNICEF Joint Monitoring Program (JMP) for Water Supply and Sanitation defines "improved" drinking water sources as follows:

- Piped water into dwelling
- Piped water into yard/plot
- Public tap/standpipes
- Tubewell/boreholes
- Protected dug wells
- Protected springs (normally part of a spring supply)
- Rainwater collection
- Bottled water, if the secondary source used by the household for cooking and personal hygiene is improved

Water sources that are not considered as "improved" are:

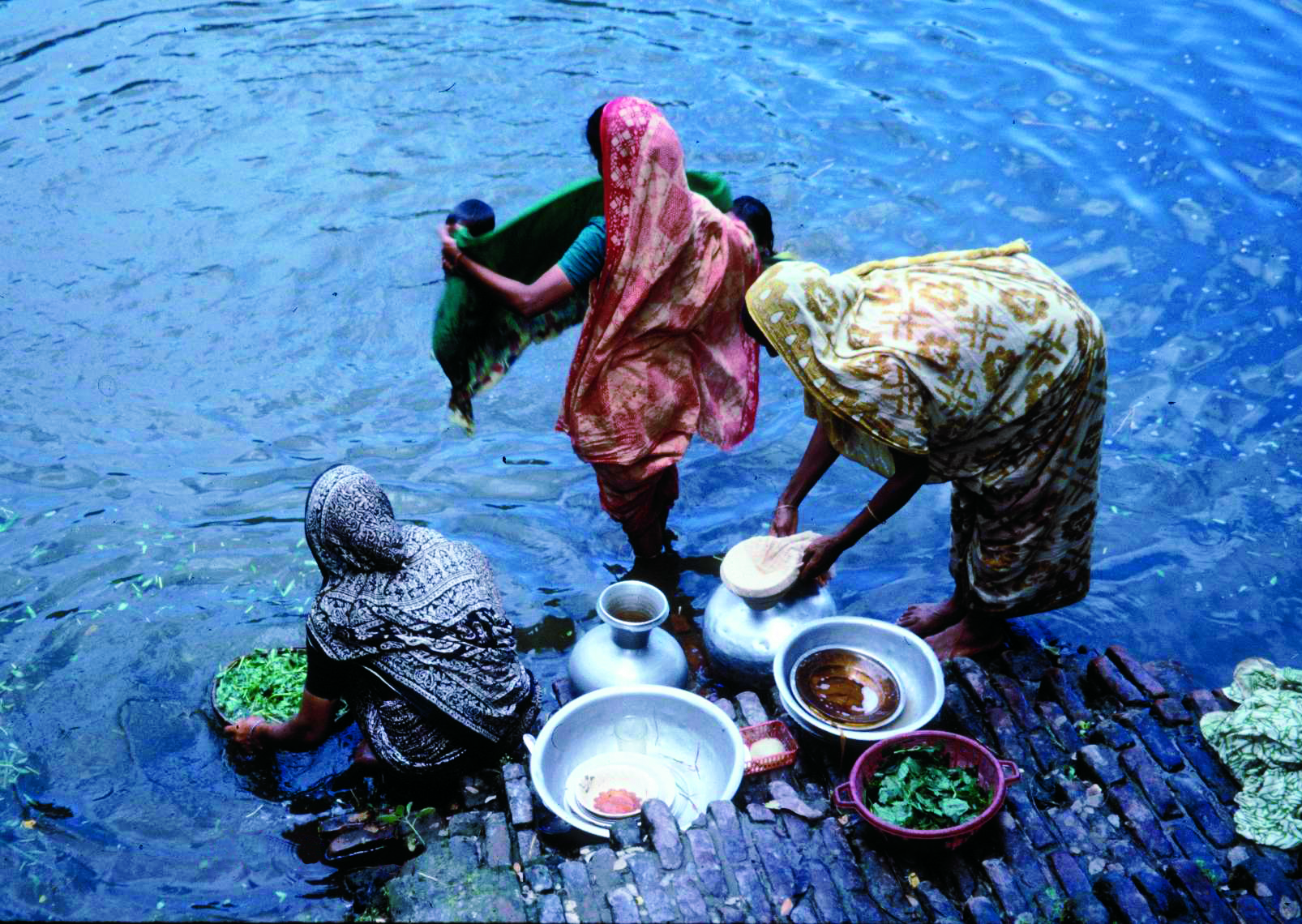
Washing utensils and vegetables

- Unprotected dug wells
- Unprotected springs
- Vendor provided water
- Cart with small tank/drum
- Bottled water, if the secondary source used by the household for cooking and personal hygiene is unimproved
- Tanker-truck
- Surface water

== See also ==
- Human right to water and sanitation
