= Spring supply =

A spring supply is a provision of piped mains water to a number of consumers direct from a natural spring. Spring supplies are therefore a source of groundwater, which in most instances has fewer micro-organisms (e.g. coliform bacteria and protozoa such as Giardia and Cryptosporidium) and chemical contaminants than a supply from surface water. The point at which the groundwater reaches the surface is prone to contamination, so must be protected using a structure called a spring box. This is often surrounded by a fence to keep animals out, with other common features being a ditch on the uphill side, an overflow pipe and a well fitting lid. Spring supplies can range from single property supplies that are privately owned, to large supplies that are managed by water companies and serve entire communities. As with any water supply, a spring supply may need to be treated in order to bring it up to drinking water standards. The method for doing this will vary according to the contaminant, but can include sand filters, pH balancing units and ultraviolet light.

== Countries ==
In the United Kingdom, over half a million people live or work in a premises that relies on a private water supply such as a spring. The Drinking Water Inspectorate (DWI) of England and Wales produces an annual report on the quality of private water supplies.

== See also ==
- Water supply
- Improved water source
- Water well
