= Baptist well drilling =

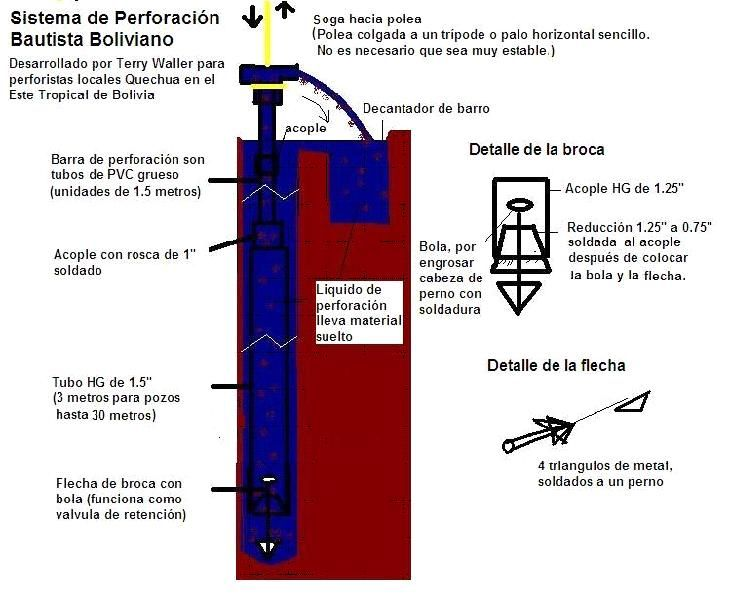
Baptist well drilling diagram in Spanish

Baptist well drilling is a very simple, manual method to drill water wells. The Baptist drilling rig can be built in any ordinary arc welding workshop and materials for a basic version costs about 150 US dollars (2006 prices). In suitable conditions, boreholes over 100 m deep have been drilled with this method.

== History ==
The method was developed by Terry Waller, a North American Baptist missionary in Africa and Bolivia. It applies some of the same principles used in mechanized commercial well drilling, but does so using the simplest, most available and cheapest possible materials.

== Social / development context ==
Rural people in developing countries often cannot afford to have specialists drill or dig wells for them. This method was developed to provide poor people with a way to help themselves with their water supply.

A Baptist drilling rig, fit to drill holes up to 30 metres (98 ft) deep, can be built in Nicaragua for about US $150. This includes all essential non-common tools to operate it. Its core element, the drill bits, can be made in about any arc-welding workshop, using only scrap steel and materials that can be found in virtually any hardware store.

Once the well is drilled, it is cased with an inexpensive PVC tube. Fitting the well with a slab of concrete as a sanitary seal and a simple PVC piston pump (also built by the users themselves) will cost about 2.5 dollars per meter well depth.

== Suitable conditions ==
A hybrid between sludging and percussion drilling, this method permits to drill through all kinds of loose alluvial soils, sands, silts and clays, as well as “soft” rocks, like light conglomerates, consolidated volcanic ashes, some calcareous rocks and weathered materials. It will not penetrate hard igneous rock or boulders (e.g. in ancient river beds).

== Technical specifications ==
Like in sludging, the drilling process is continuous: the drill bit is normally not removed from the borehole until it is finished and the broken-up material is pumped to the surface in the drilling liquid (mud). But instead of using a hand as a valve on top of the drill pipe (sludging), the drill bit itself doubles as a foot-valve. The operator’s hand does not have to reach the end of the drill pipe and drill stem extensions can be several meters long.

Percussion action is performed by lifting the drill stem with a rope over a pulley, attached to a simple derrick, made with locally available materials, such as wood or bamboo poles.

The borehole diameter is kept as small as possible in order to remove a minimum of material and hence advance rapidly. The standard drill bit is based on 1.25 inches (3.2 cm) water pipe fittings and unless a larger diameter is required, the borehole is cased with 1.5 inches (3.8 cm) PVC pipe.

The main drill tool consists of a length of metal pipe with a bit/valve. Extensions are standard PVC potable water pipes.

No temporary casing is used. The borehole being kept full of mud and the “caking” of mud into any unstable sand layers, as a consequence of the percussion action and friction of the smooth lateral edges of the bit, is normally sufficient to stabilize it. The drilling mud is evacuated from the borehole after casing the well by pouring or injecting water into the casing, called backwashing.

This technique adapts best to sand, loam and light rock. The standard drill bits also work through sticky and even consolidated clays. Nevertheless, best results in varying conditions are obtained with an array of different bits:

- Movable point bits for general purpose and clay-holding soils: the moving stem of the heavy dart helps to keep the foot valve clean.
- Fixed point bits for sandy and rocky layers, where there is no risk for sticky material to obstruct the foot valve.
- Open-ended (hollow) bits without a foot valve (pure sludging) for layers of pure clay or gravel. In these conditions the presence of a foot valve may slow down progress, since clay has to be pounded into suspension and stones have to be ground to small pieces in order to enter the drilling tool through the foot valve.

== Reaming ==
If required, the upper part of the well can be reamed and cased with larger diameter pipe (3 or 5 inches), to accommodate larger pumps. A shallow (large diameter) rope pump, for example, may require a wider well and submersible pumps commonly need at least 4". Note that there is no need to enlarge the entire depth of the borehole: reaming until slightly below the lowest expected water table (the pump's water intake) is sufficient.
