= Sludging =

Simple well drilling method

Sludging is a very simple well drilling method developed in ancient India but still used extensively in developing countries, where capital is scarce, but manpower abundant.

A pipe is moved up and down in a hole filled with water (mud). Every time the pipe hits the bottom, some soil material is loosened and suspended into the drilling mud, which is continuously pumped out of the borehole by a valve, taking advantage of the same reciprocating movement.

In its basic form, a bamboo pipe (internal knots removed) is used, and the operator uses his hand on top of this pipe as a valve. On upstroke, a vacuum is created in the pipe under the operator's hand and the column of mud in the pipe is lifted. On downstroke, new mud enters the pipe from beneath and the upper portion is expulsed.

For wells deeper than about 10 metres, and especially when heavier metal drill pipe is used, a lifting device is installed. This ranges from a rope over a pulley or a pole, attached to the drill pipe with a rope and used as a lever. In this case, the driller only acts on downstroke, giving an extra push to the drill stem, while the upward movement is assured by other workers, pulling the rope or pushing down the lever, or by a small motor.

The basic method will work only in loose (clay, silt, sand and light gravel) soils, but adaptations of the principle are applied in a number of modern hand drilling methods, with valves either at the top or at the bottom of the pipe and with various models of drill bits for different soil conditions. Well documented examples are the Rota-sludge, Baptist and some variants of the EMAS drilling methods.

Perhaps the simplest and cheapest of them all is the Baptist well drilling method, which uses lightweight and cheap PVC pipe for most of the drill stem and in which the drill bit doubles as a foot valve. Wells over 100 metres deep have been drilled this way.
