= Well =

Excavation or structure to provide access to groundwater

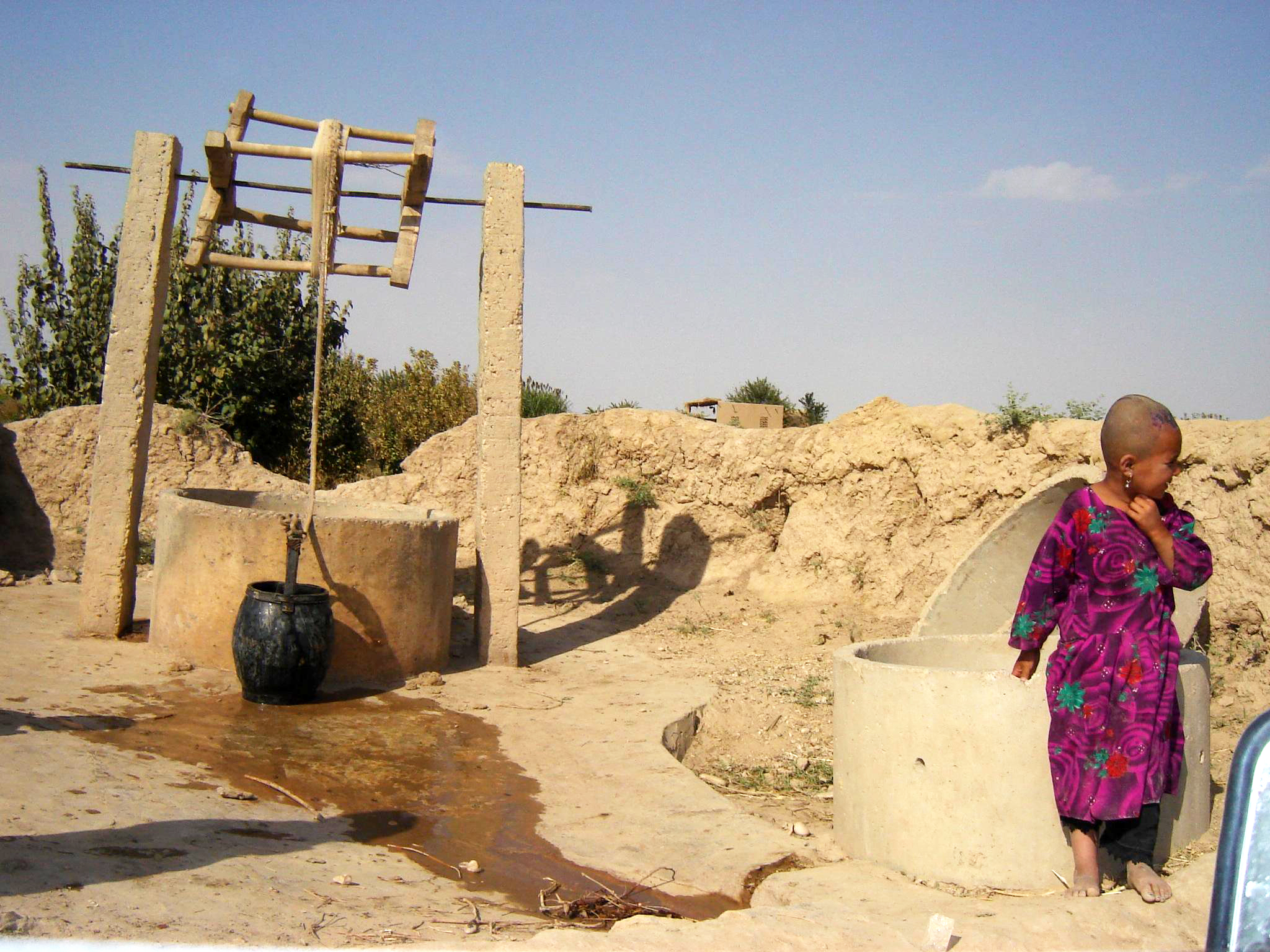
A dug well in a village in Faryab Province, Afghanistan

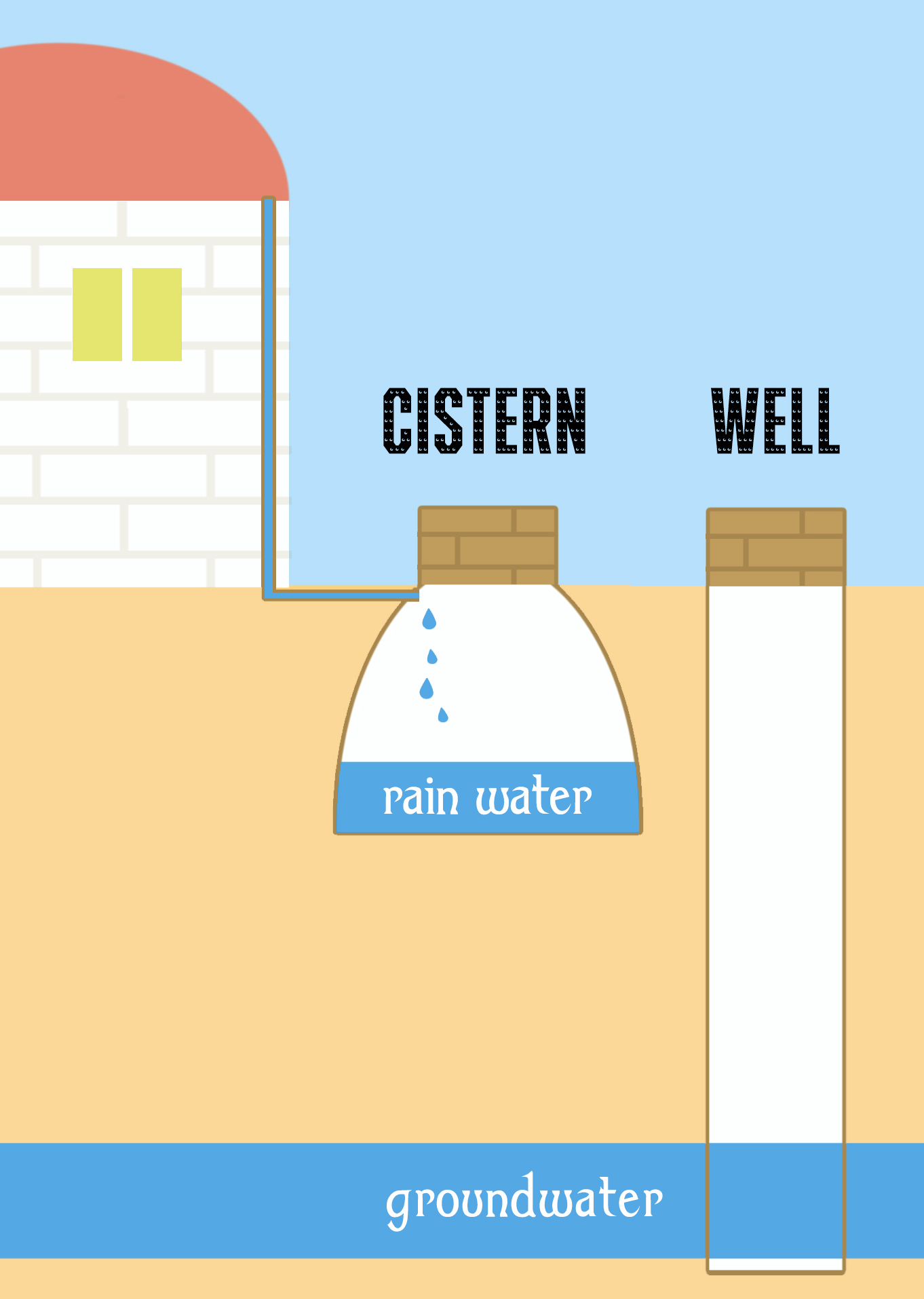
The difference between a well and a cistern is in the source of the water: a cistern collects rainwater whereas a well draws from groundwater.

A well is an excavation or structure created on the earth by digging, driving, or drilling to access liquid resources, usually water. The oldest and most common kind of well is a water well, to access groundwater in underground aquifers. The well water is drawn up by a pump, or using containers, such as buckets that are raised mechanically or by hand. Water can also be injected back into the aquifer through the well. Wells were first constructed at least eight thousand years ago and historically vary in construction from a sediment of a dry watercourse to the qanats of Iran, and the stepwells and sakiehs of India. Placing a lining in the well shaft helps create stability, and linings of wood or wickerwork date back at least as far as the Iron Age.

Wells have traditionally been sunk by hand digging, as is still the case in rural areas of the developing world. These wells are inexpensive and low-tech as they use mostly manual labour, and the structure can be lined with brick or stone as the excavation proceeds. A more modern method called caissoning uses pre-cast reinforced concrete well rings that are lowered into the hole. Driven wells can be created in unconsolidated material with a well hole structure, which consists of a hardened drive point and a screen of perforated pipe, after which a pump is installed to collect the water. Deeper wells can be excavated by hand drilling methods or machine drilling, using a bit in a borehole. Drilled wells are usually cased with a factory-made pipe composed of steel or plastic. Drilled wells can access water at much greater depths than dug wells.

Two broad classes of well are shallow or unconfined wells completed within the uppermost saturated aquifer at that location, and deep or confined wells, sunk through an impermeable stratum into an aquifer beneath. A collector well can be constructed adjacent to a freshwater lake or stream with water percolating through the intervening material. The site of a well can be selected by a hydrogeologist, or groundwater surveyor. Water may be pumped or hand drawn. Impurities from the surface can easily reach shallow sources and contamination of the supply by pathogens or chemical contaminants needs to be avoided. Well water typically contains more minerals in solution than surface water and may require treatment before being potable. Soil salination can occur as the water table falls and the surrounding soil begins to dry out. Another environmental problem is the potential for methane to seep into the water.

== History ==
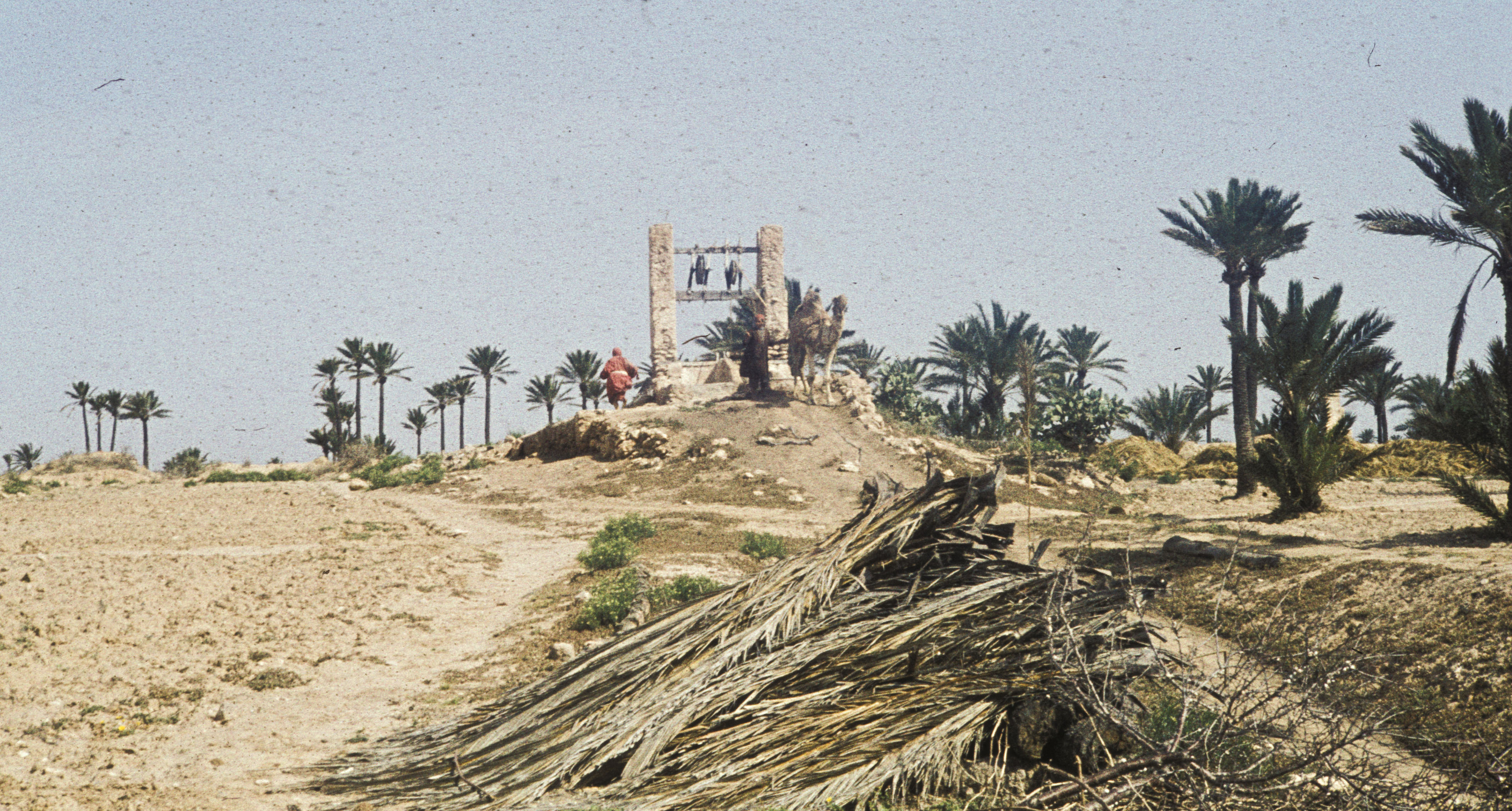
Camel drawing water from a well, Djerba island, Tunisia, 1960

Very early Neolithic wells are known from the Eastern Mediterranean. The oldest reliably dated well is from the pre-pottery neolithic (PPN) site of Kissonerga-Mylouthkia on Cyprus. At around 8400 BC a shaft (well 116) of circular diameter was driven through limestone to reach an aquifer at a depth of 8 metres (26 ft). Well 2070 from Kissonerga-Mylouthkia, dating to the late PPN, reaches a depth of 13 metres (43 ft). Other slightly younger wells are known from this site and from neighbouring Parekklisha-Shillourokambos. A first stone lined well of 5.5 metres (18 ft) depth is documented from a drowned final PPN (c. 7000 BC) site at 'Atlit-Yam off the coast near modern Haifa in Israel.

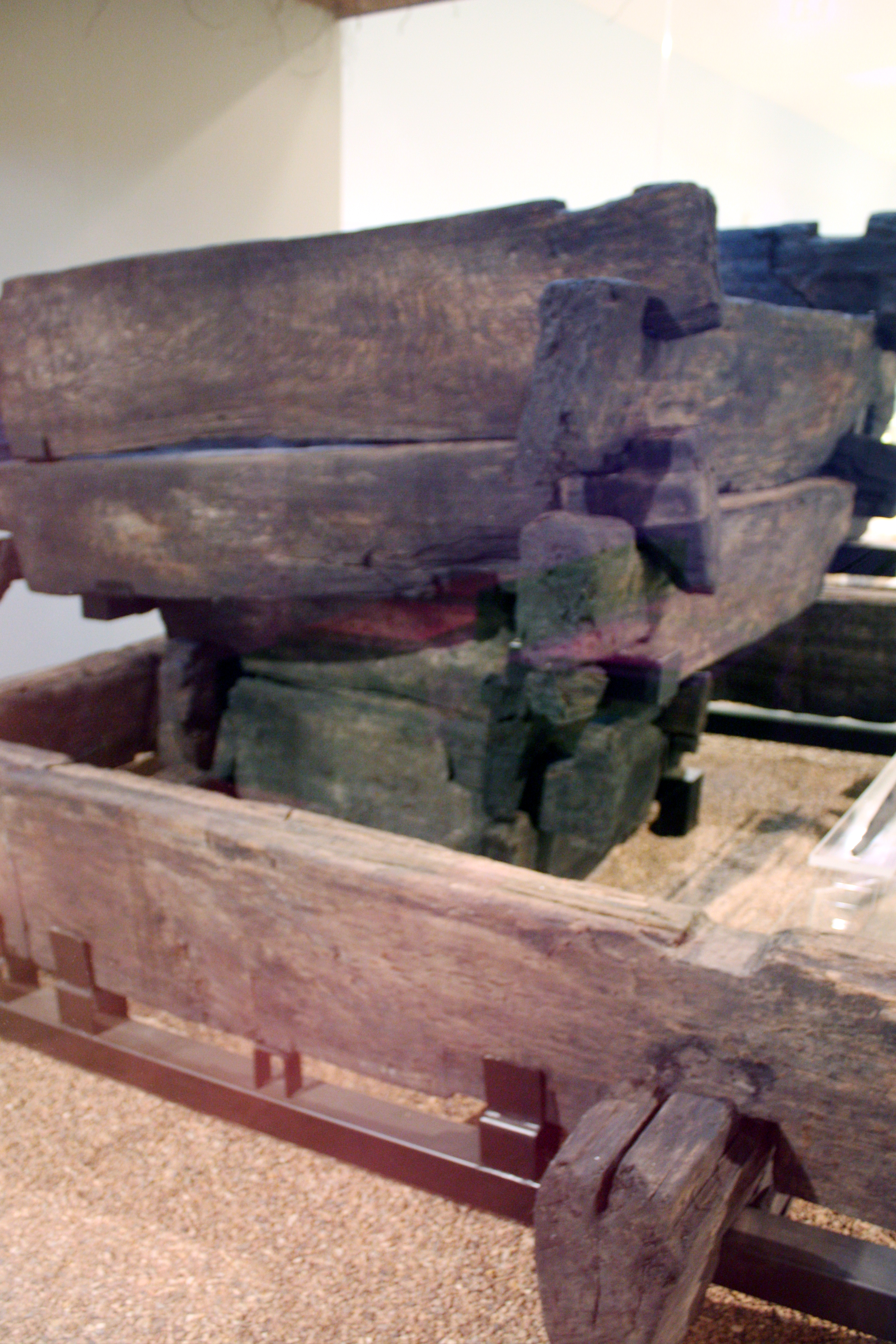
Neolithic Linear Pottery culture well, 5300 BC, Erkelenz, Germany

Wood-lined wells are known from the early Neolithic Linear Pottery culture, for example in Ostrov, Czech Republic, dated 5265 BC, Kückhoven (an outlying centre of Erkelenz), dated 5300 BC, and Eythra in Schletz (an outlying centre of Asparn an der Zaya) in Austria, dated 5200 BC.

The Neolithic Chinese discovered and made extensive use of deep drilled groundwater for drinking. The Chinese text The Book of Changes, originally a divination text of the Western Zhou dynasty (1046 -771 BC), contains an entry describing how the ancient Chinese maintained their wells and protected their sources of water. A well excavated at the Hemedu excavation site was believed to have been built during the neolithic era. The well was cased by four rows of logs with a square frame attached to them at the top of the well. 60 additional tile wells southwest of Beijing are also believed to have been built around 600 BC for drinking and irrigation.

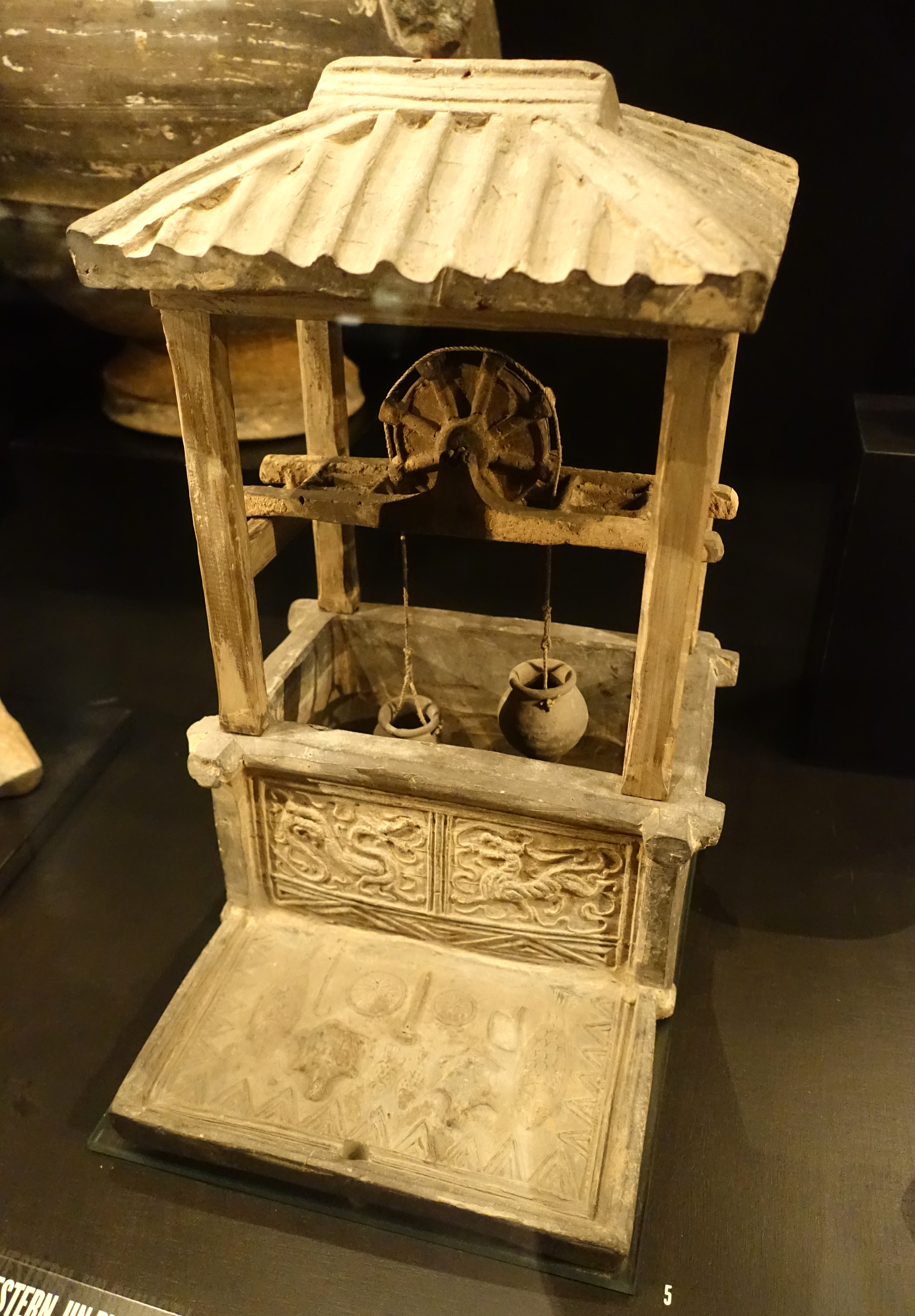
A Chinese ceramic model of a well with a water pulley system, excavated from a tomb of the Han dynasty (202 BC – 220 AD) period

In Egypt, shadoofs and sakias are used. The sakia is much more efficient, as it can bring up water from a depth of 10 metres (versus the 3 metres of the shadoof). The sakia is the Egyptian version of the noria. Some of the world's oldest known wells, located in Cyprus, date to 7000–8,500 BC. Two wells from the Neolithic period, around 6500 BC, have been discovered in Israel. One is in Atlit, on the northern coast of Israel, and the other is in the Jezreel Valley.

Wells for other purposes came along much later, historically. The first recorded salt well was dug in the Sichuan province of China around 2,250 years ago. This was the first time that ancient water well technology was applied successfully for the exploitation of salt, and marked the beginning of Sichuan's salt drilling industry. The earliest known oil wells were also drilled in China, in 347 CE. These wells had depths of up to about 240 metres (790 ft) and were drilled using bits attached to bamboo poles. The oil was burned to evaporate brine and produce salt. By the 10th century, extensive bamboo pipelines connected oil wells with salt springs. The ancient records of China and Japan are said to contain many allusions to the use of natural gas for lighting and heating. Petroleum was known as Burning water in Japan in the 7th century.

== Types ==
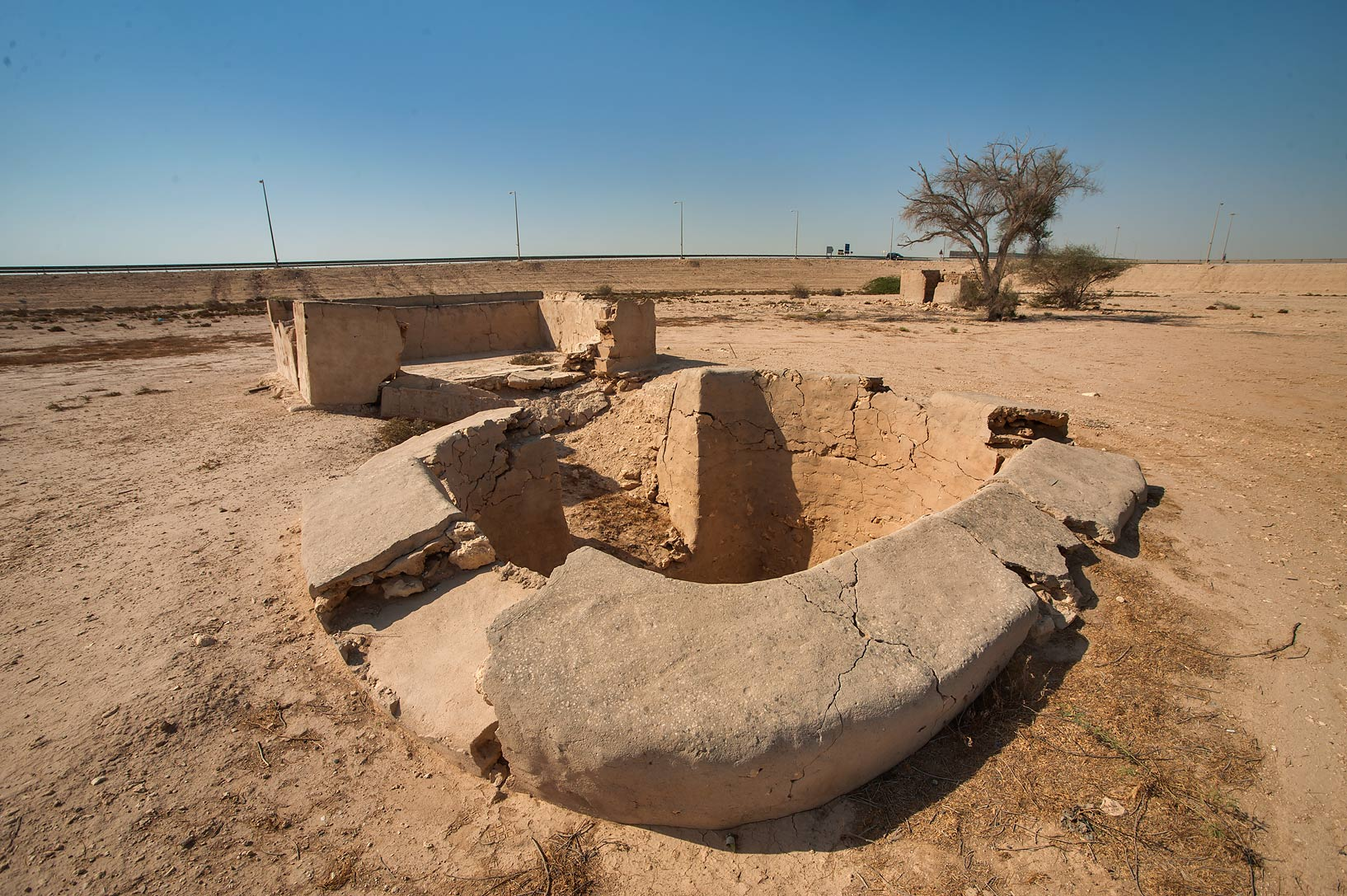
Water well near Simaisma, eastern Qatar

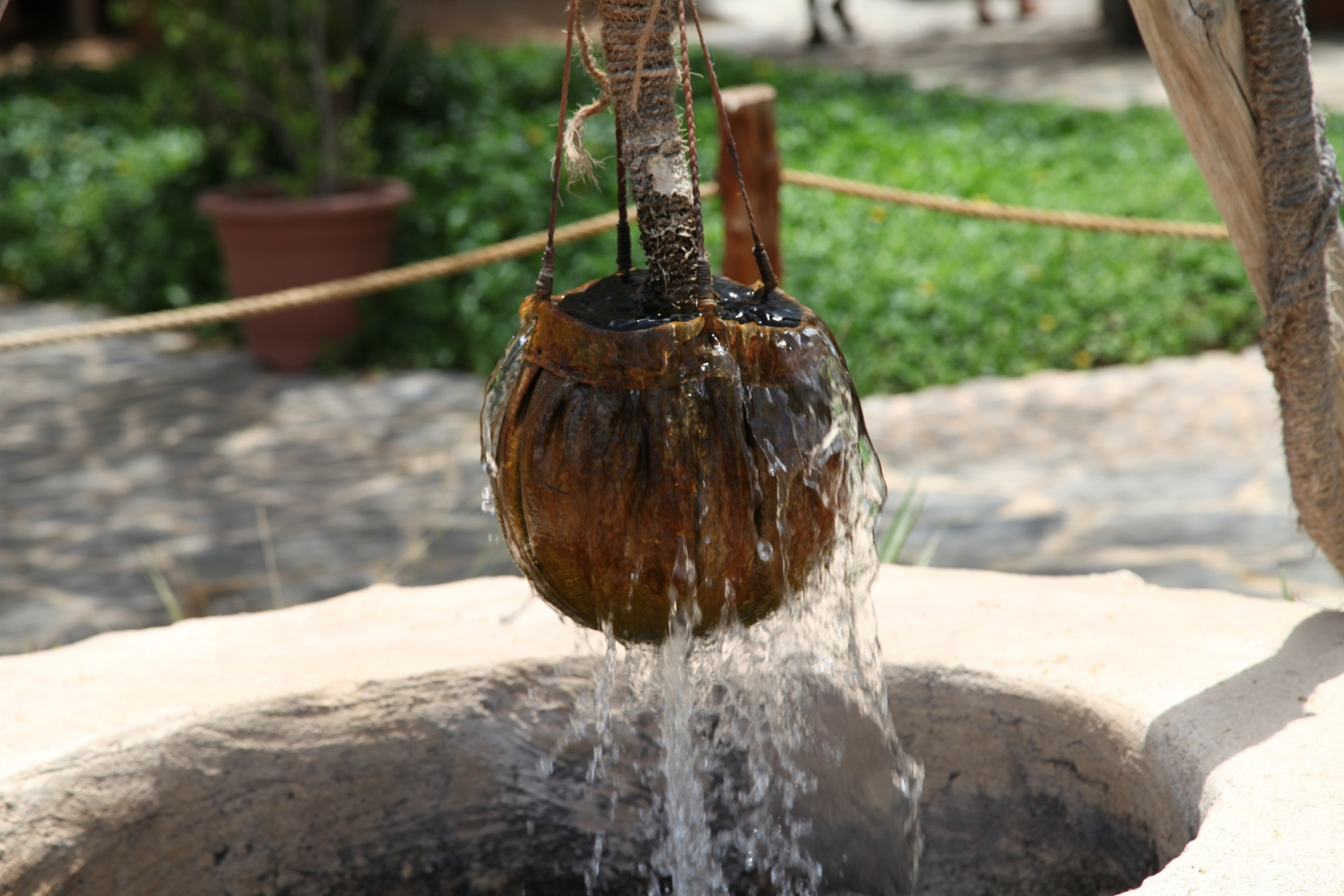
Leather bucket used for the water well

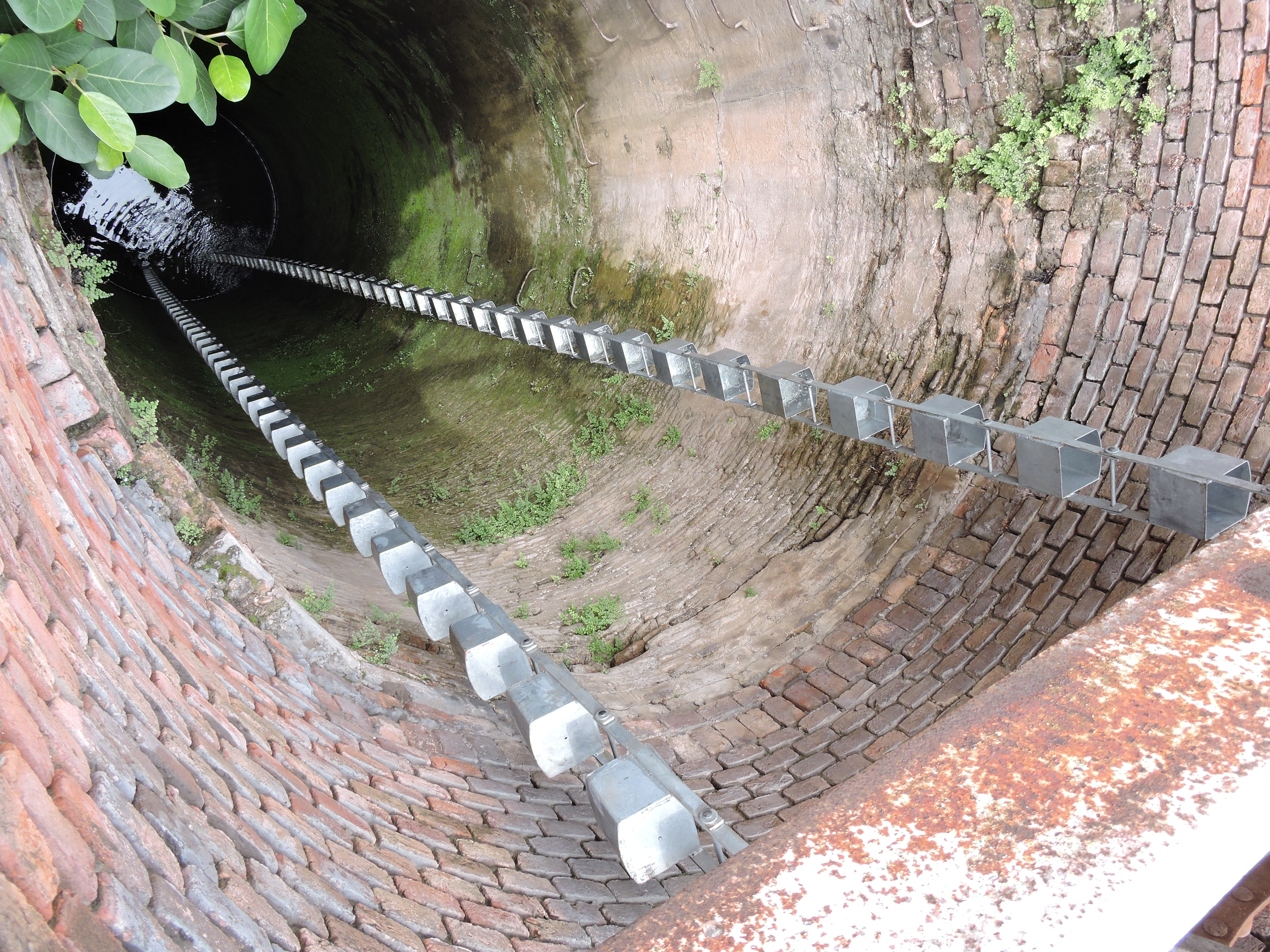
Well, Historical Village, Bhaini Sahib, Ludhiana, Punjab, India

=== Dug wells ===
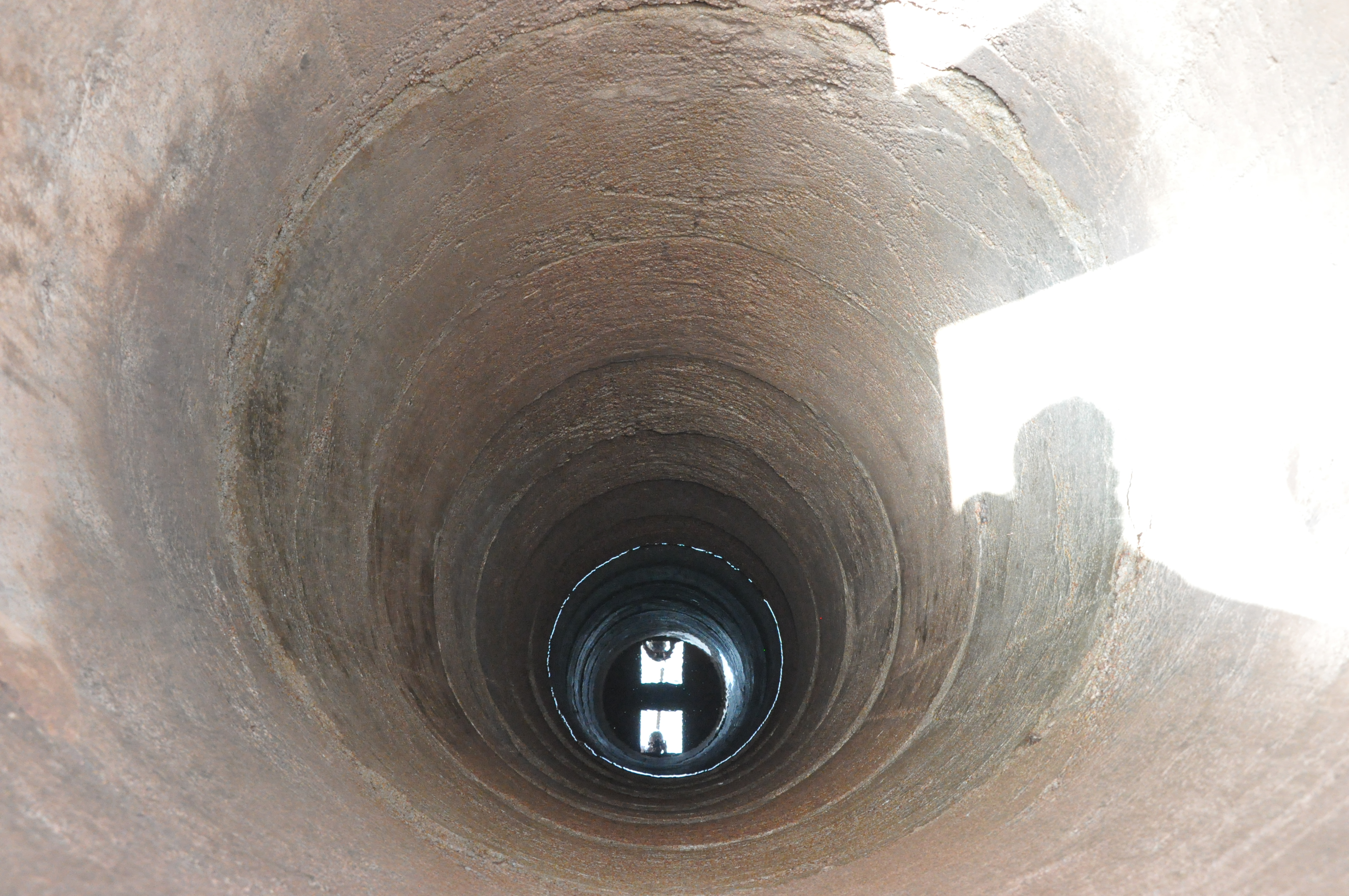
View into a hand-dug well cased with concrete rings. Ouelessebougou, Mali.

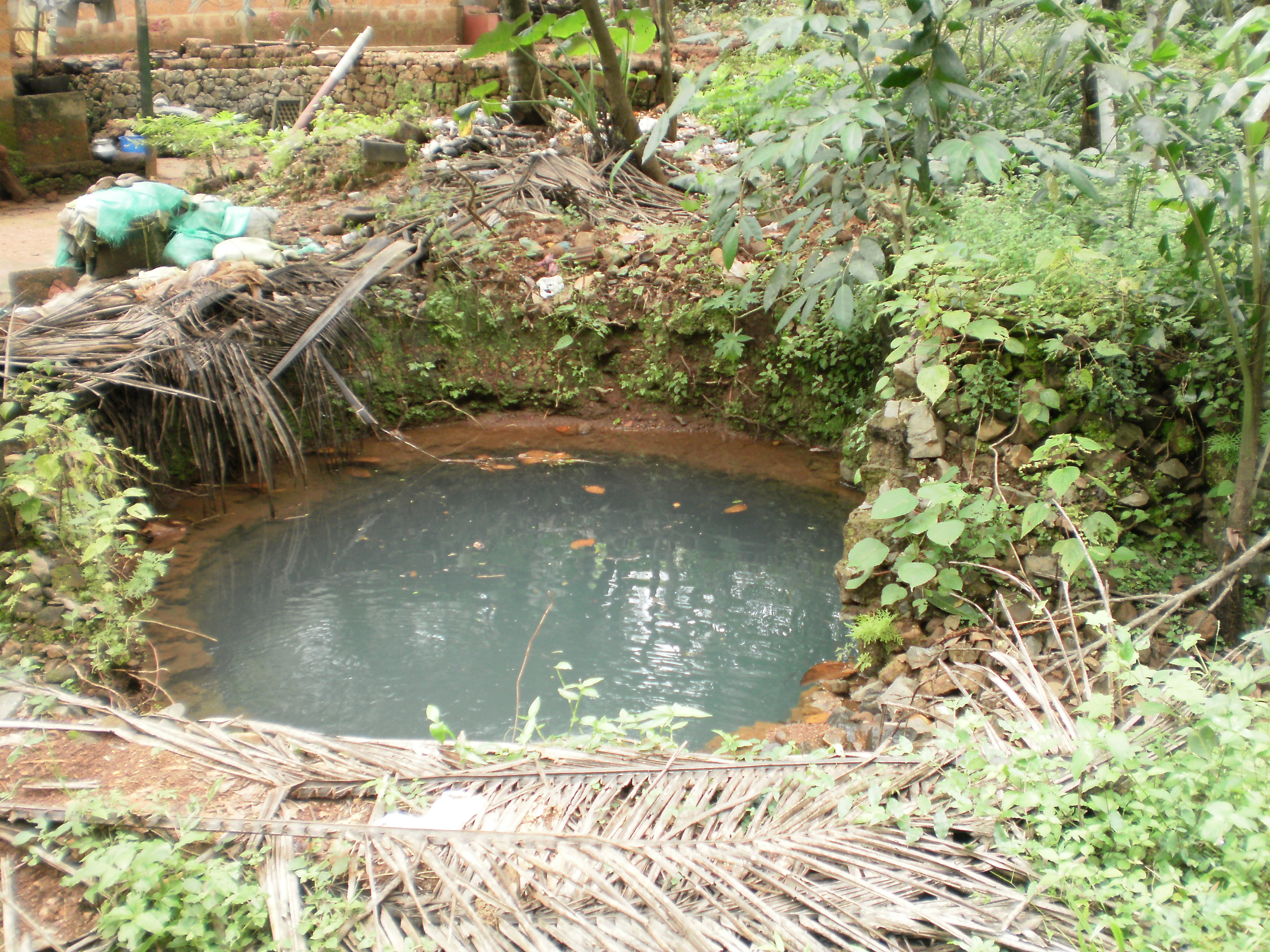
A dug well in a village in Kerala, India

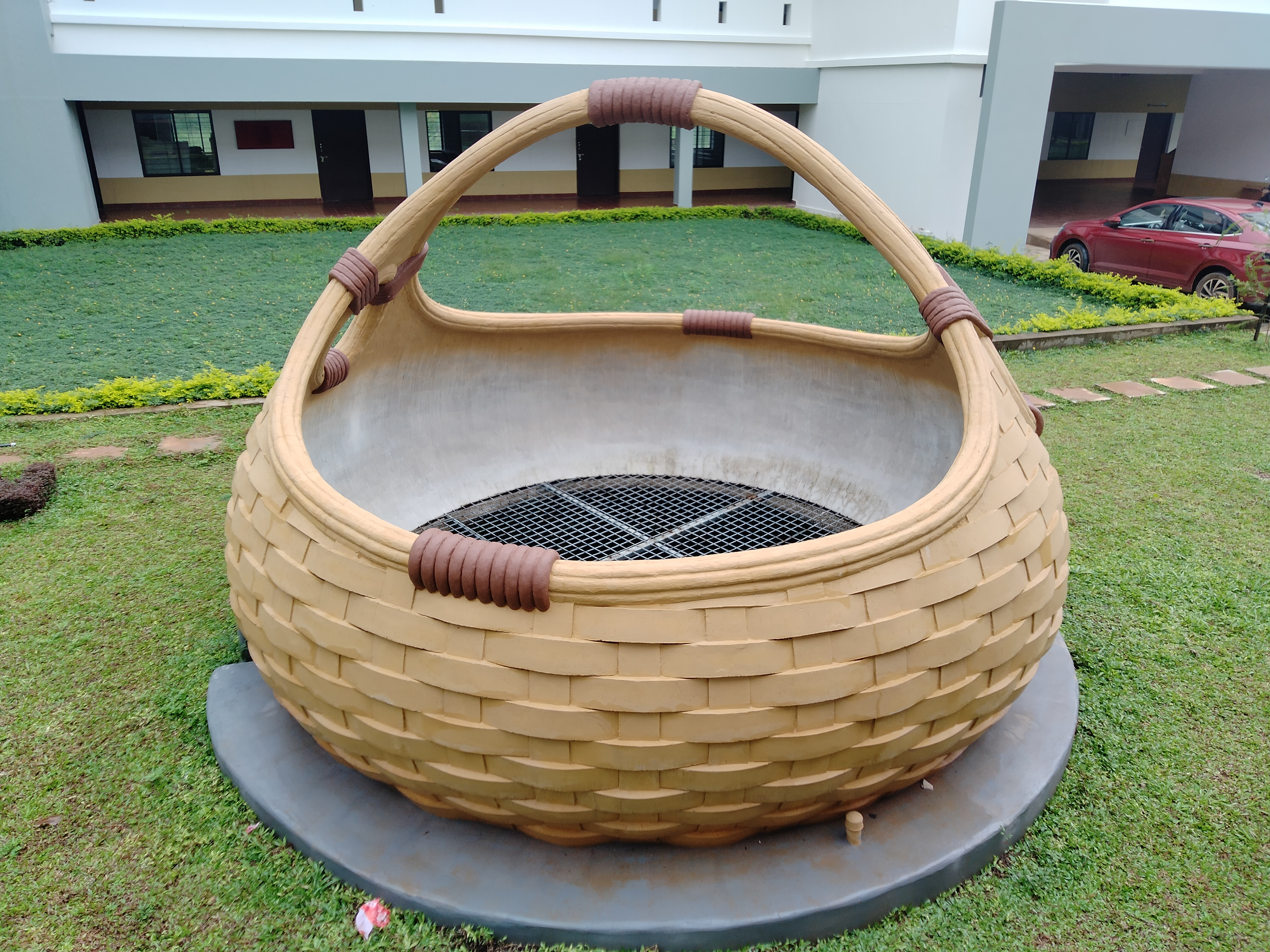
Well with a flower bag-shaped wall and podium

Until recent centuries, all artificial wells were pumpless hand-dug wells of varying degrees of sophistication, and they remain a very important source of potable water in some rural developing areas, where they are routinely dug and used today. Their indispensability has produced a number of literary references, literal and figurative, including the reference to the incident of Jesus meeting a woman at Jacob's well (John 4:6) in the Bible and the "Ding Dong Bell" nursery rhyme about a cat in a well.

Hand-dug wells are excavations with diameters large enough to accommodate one or more people with shovels digging down to below the water table. The excavation is braced horizontally to avoid landslide or erosion endangering the people digging. They can be lined with stone or brick; extending this lining upwards above the ground surface to form a wall around the well serves to reduce both contamination and accidental falls into the well.

A more modern method called caissoning uses reinforced concrete or plain concrete pre-cast well rings that are lowered into the hole. A well-digging team digs under a cutting ring and the well column slowly sinks into the aquifer, whilst protecting the team from collapse of the well bore.

Hand-dug wells are inexpensive and low tech (compared to drilling) and they use mostly manual labour to access groundwater in rural locations of developing countries. They may be built with a high degree of community participation, or by local entrepreneurs who specialize in hand-dug wells. They have been successfully excavated to 60 metres (200 ft). They have low operational and maintenance costs, in part because water can be extracted by hand, without a pump. The water often comes from an aquifer or groundwater, and can be easily deepened, which may be necessary if the ground water level drops, by telescoping the lining further down into the aquifer. The yield of existing hand dug wells may be improved by deepening or introducing vertical tunnels or perforated pipes.

Drawbacks to hand-dug wells are numerous. It can be impractical to hand dig wells in areas where hard rock is present, and they can be time-consuming to dig and line even in favourable areas. Because they exploit shallow aquifers, the well may be susceptible to yield fluctuations and possible contamination from surface water, including sewage. Hand dug well construction generally requires the use of a well trained construction team, and the capital investment for equipment such as concrete ring moulds, heavy lifting equipment, well shaft formwork, motorized de-watering pumps, and fuel can be large for people in developing countries. Construction of hand dug wells can be dangerous due to collapse of the well bore, falling objects and asphyxiation, including from dewatering pump exhaust fumes.

The Woodingdean Water Well, hand-dug between 1858 and 1862, is the deepest hand-dug well at 392 metres (1,285 ft). The Big Well in Greensburg, Kansas, is billed as the world's largest hand-dug well, at 109 feet (33 m) deep and 32 feet (9.8 m) in diameter. However, the Well of Joseph in the Cairo Citadel at 280 feet (85 m) deep and the Pozzo di San Patrizio (St. Patrick's Well) built in 1527 in Orvieto, Italy, at 61 metres (200 ft) deep by 13 metres (43 ft) wide are both larger by volume.

=== Driven wells ===
Driven wells may be very simply created in unconsolidated material with a well hole structure, which consists of a hardened drive point and a screen (perforated pipe). The point is simply hammered into the ground, usually with a tripod and driver, with pipe sections added as needed. A driver is a weighted pipe that slides over the pipe being driven and is repeatedly dropped on it. When groundwater is encountered, the well is washed of sediment and a pump installed.

=== Drilled wells ===
Drilled wells are constructed using various types of drilling machines, such as top-head rotary, table rotary, or cable tool, which all use drilling stems that rotate to cut into the formation, thus the term "drilling."

Drilled wells can be excavated by simple hand drilling methods (augering, sludging, jetting, driving, hand percussion) or machine drilling (auger, rotary, percussion, down the hole hammer). Deep rock rotary drilling method is most common. Rotary can be used in 90% of formation types (consolidated).

Drilled wells can get water from a much deeper level than dug wells can − often down to several hundred metres.

Drilled wells with electric pumps are used throughout the world, typically in rural or sparsely populated areas, though many urban areas are supplied partly by municipal wells. Most shallow well drilling machines are mounted on large trucks, trailers, or tracked vehicle carriages. Water wells typically range from 3 to 18 metres (10–60 ft) deep, but in some areas it can go deeper than 900 metres (3,000 ft).

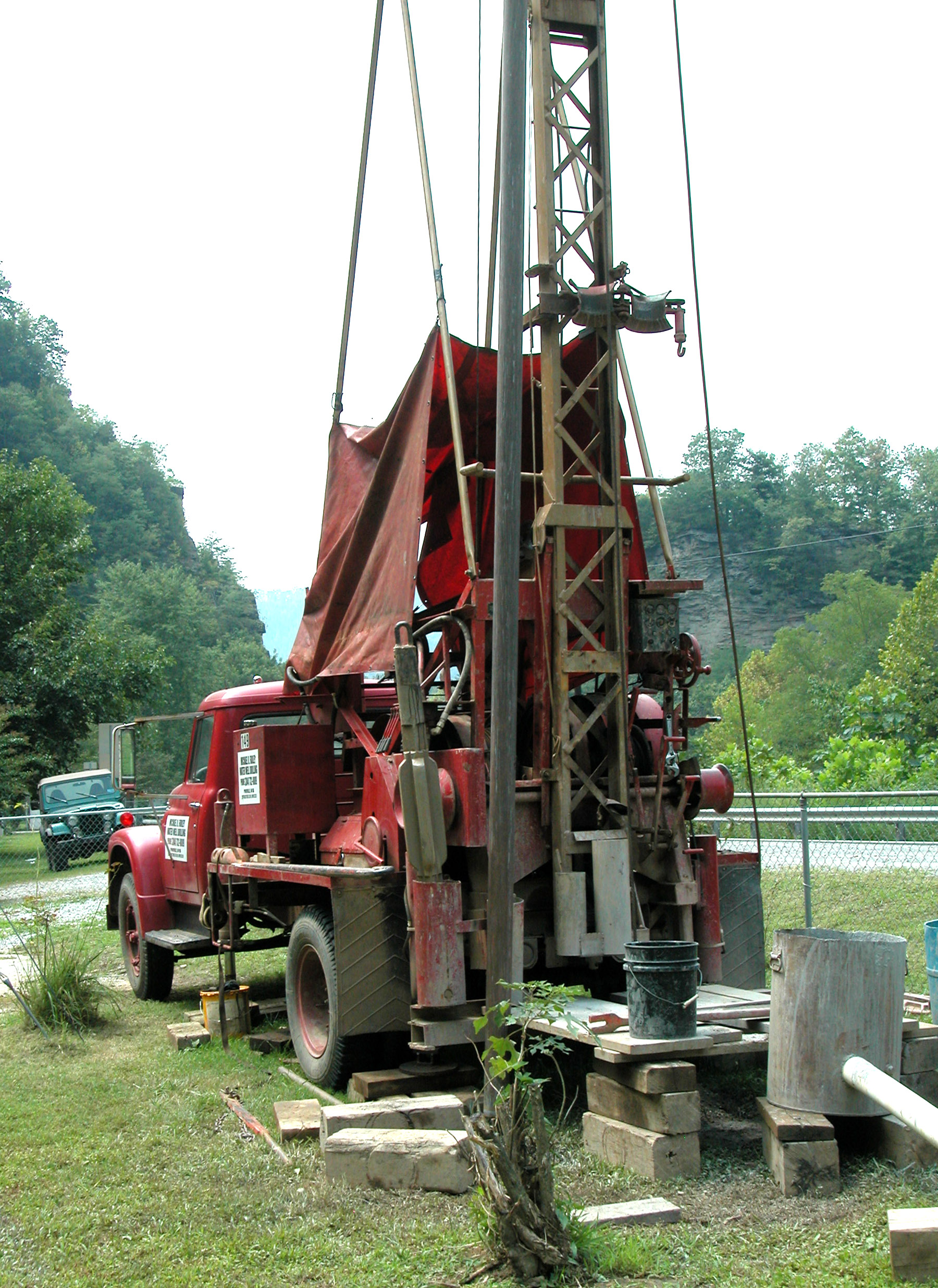
Cable tool water well drilling rig in Kimball, West Virginia

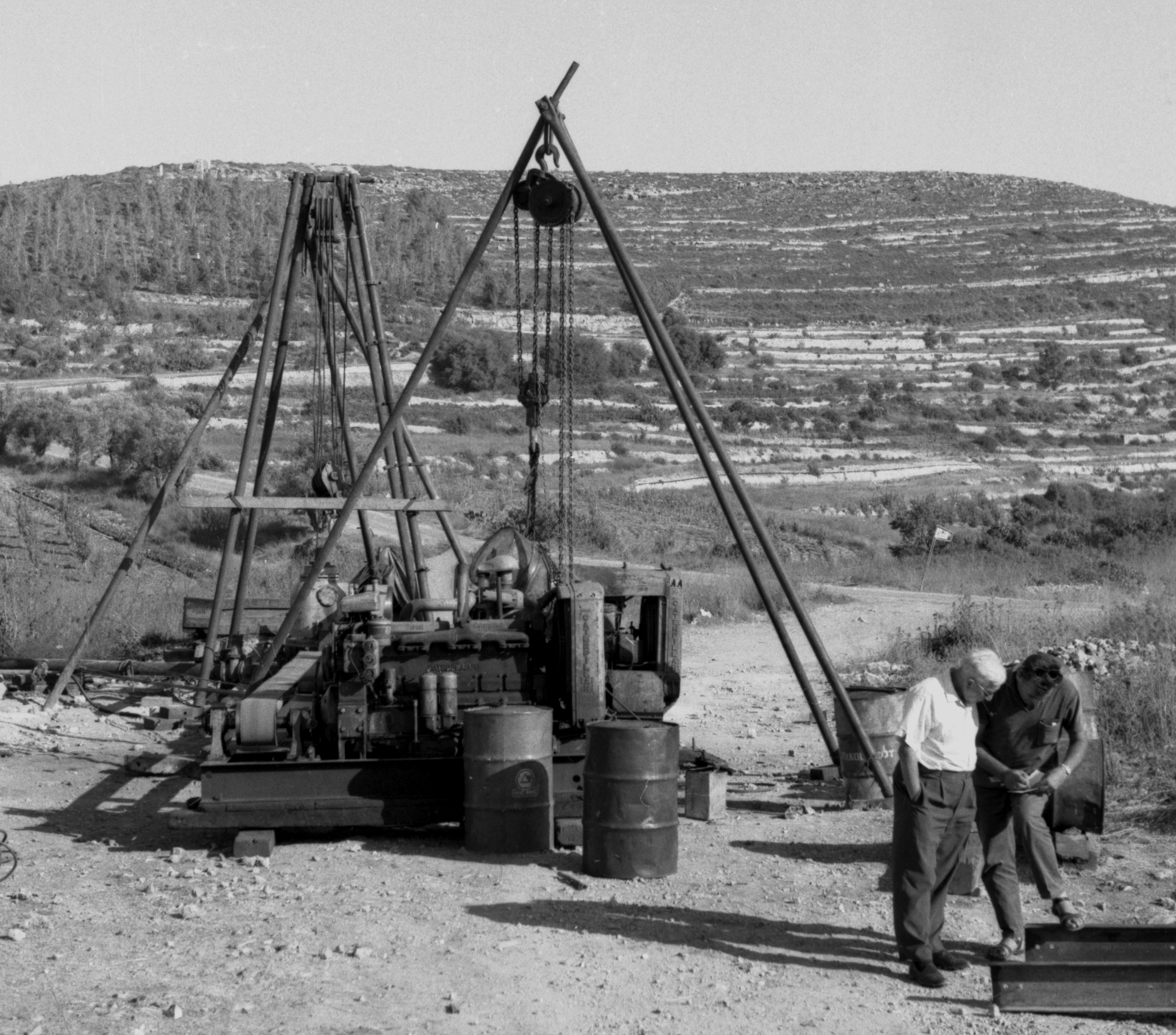
Israeli geologist Leo Picard (white shirt) inspects a drilled water well outside the depopulated Palestinian village of Bayt Naqquba

Rotary drilling machines use a segmented steel drilling string, typically made up of 3m (10ft), 6 m (20 ft) to 8m (26ft) sections of steel tubing that are threaded together, with a bit or other drilling device at the bottom end. Some rotary drilling machines are designed to install (by driving or drilling) a steel casing into the well in conjunction with the drilling of the actual bore hole. Air and/or water is used as a circulation fluid to displace cuttings and cool bits during the drilling. Another form of rotary-style drilling, termed mud rotary, makes use of a specially made mud, or drilling fluid, which is constantly being altered during the drill so that it can consistently create enough hydraulic pressure to hold the side walls of the bore hole open, regardless of the presence of a casing in the well. Typically, boreholes drilled into solid rock are not cased until after the drilling process is completed, regardless of the machinery used.

The oldest form of drilling machinery is the cable tool, still used today. Specifically designed to raise and lower a bit into the bore hole, the spudding of the drill causes the bit to be raised and dropped onto the bottom of the hole, and the design of the cable causes the bit to twist at approximately 1/4 revolution per drop, thereby creating a drilling action. Unlike rotary drilling, cable tool drilling requires the drilling action to be stopped so that the bore hole can be bailed or emptied of drilled cuttings. Cable tool drilling rigs are rare as they tend to be 10x slower to drill through materials compared to similar diameter rotary air or rotary mud equipped rigs.

Drilled wells are usually cased with a factory-made pipe, typically steel (in air rotary or cable tool drilling) or plastic/PVC (in mud rotary wells, also present in wells drilled into solid rock). The casing is constructed by welding, either chemically or thermally, segments of casing together. If the casing is installed during the drilling, most drills will drive the casing into the ground as the bore hole advances, while some newer machines will actually allow for the casing to be rotated and drilled into the formation in a similar manner as the bit advancing just below. PVC or plastic is typically solvent welded and then lowered into the drilled well, vertically stacked with their ends nested and either glued or splined together. The sections of casing are usually 6 metres (20 ft) or more in length, and 4 to 12 in (10 to 30 cm) in diameter, depending on the intended use of the well and local groundwater conditions.

Surface contamination of wells in the United States is typically controlled by the use of a surface seal. A large hole is drilled to a predetermined depth or to a confining formation (clay or bedrock, for example), and then a smaller hole for the well is completed from that point forward. The well is typically cased from the surface down into the smaller hole with a casing that is the same diameter as that hole. The annular space between the large bore hole and the smaller casing is filled with bentonite clay, concrete, or other sealant material. This creates an impermeable seal from the surface to the next confining layer that keeps contaminants from traveling down the outer sidewalls of the casing or borehole and into the aquifer. In addition, wells are typically capped with either an engineered well cap or seal that vents air through a screen into the well, but keeps insects, small animals, and unauthorized persons from accessing the well.

At the bottom of wells, based on formation, a screening device, filter pack, slotted casing, or open bore hole is left to allow the flow of water into the well. Constructed screens are typically used in unconsolidated formations (sands, gravels, etc.), allowing water and a percentage of the formation to pass through the screen. Allowing some material to pass through creates a large area filter out of the rest of the formation, as the amount of material present to pass into the well slowly decreases and is removed from the well. Rock wells are typically cased with a PVC liner/casing and screen or slotted casing at the bottom, this is mostly present just to keep rocks from entering the pump assembly. Some wells use a filter pack method, where an undersized screen or slotted casing is placed inside the well and a filter medium is packed around the screen, between the screen and the borehole or casing. This allows the water to be filtered of unwanted materials before entering the well and pumping zone.

An automated water well system powered by a jet-pump

An automated water well system powered by a submersible pump

A water well system with a cistern

A water well system with a pressurized cistern

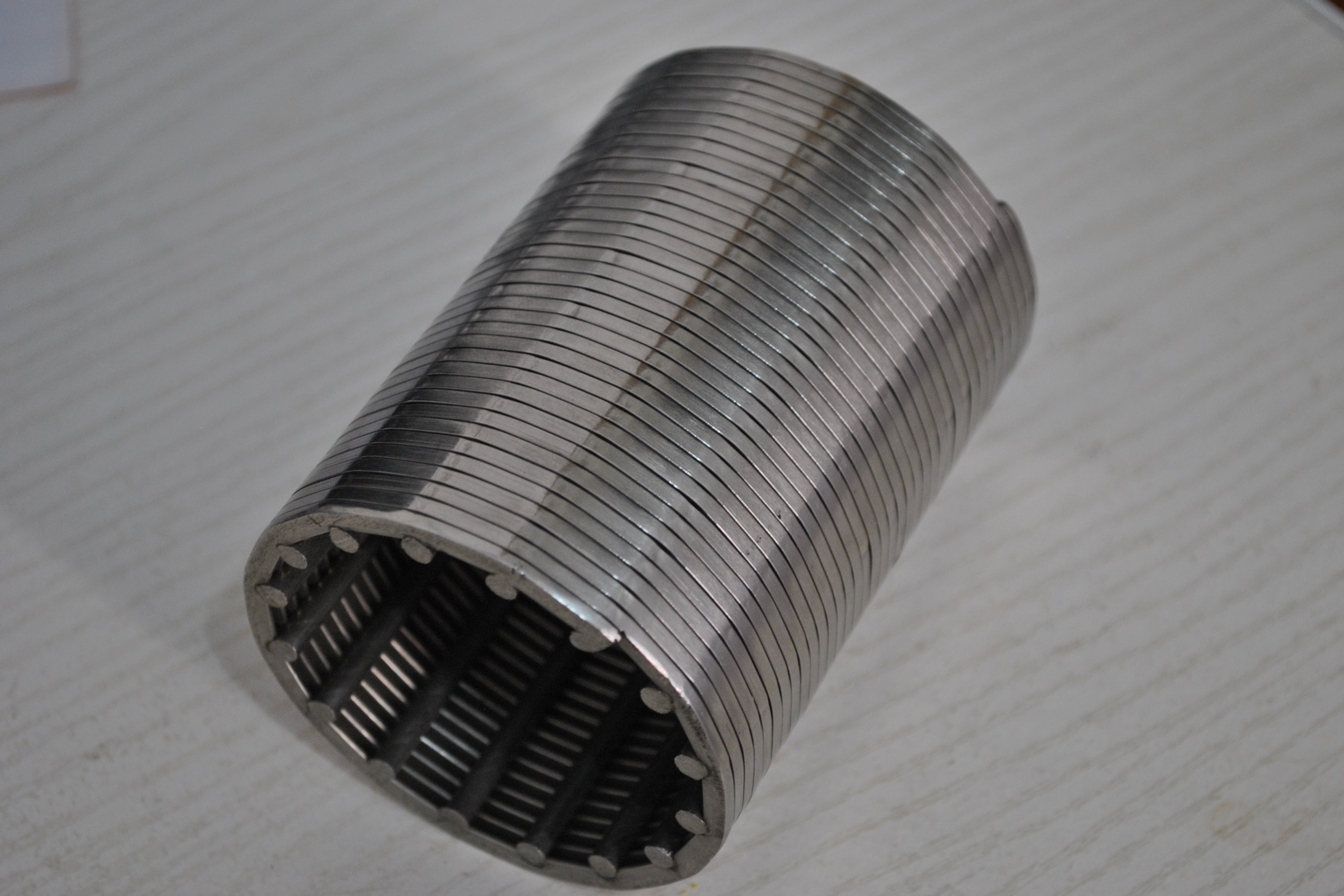
A section of a stainless steel screen well

== Classification ==
Water well types

There are two broad classes of drilled-well types, based on the type of aquifer the well is in:

- Shallow or unconfined wells are completed in the uppermost saturated aquifer at that location (the upper unconfined aquifer).
- Deep or confined wells are sunk through an impermeable stratum into an aquifer that is sandwiched between two impermeable strata (aquitards or aquicludes). The majority of deep aquifers are classified as artesian because the hydraulic head in a confined well is higher than the level of the top of the aquifer. If the hydraulic head in a confined well is higher than the land surface it is a "flowing" artesian well (named after Artois in France).

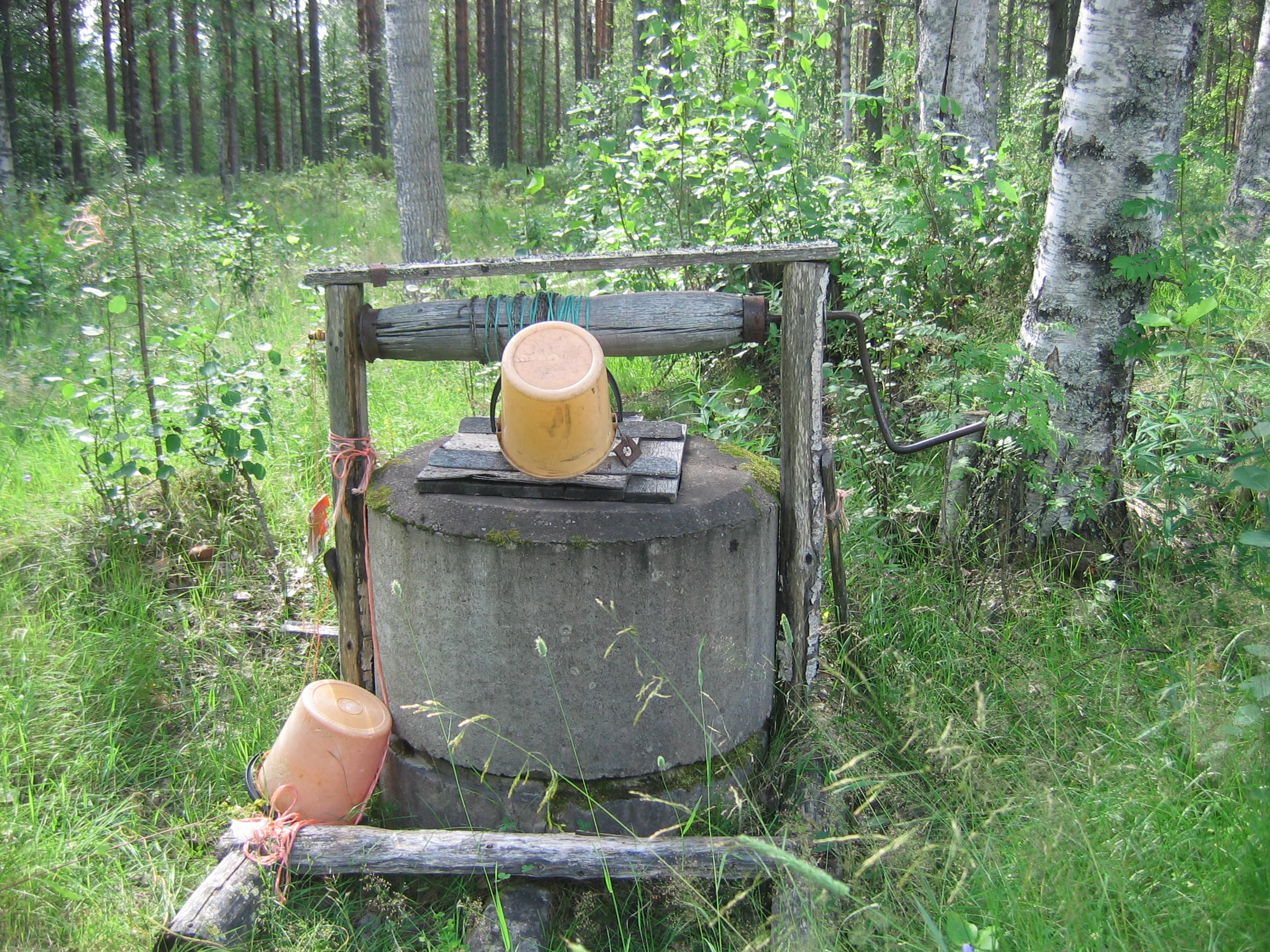
An old-fashioned water well in the countryside of Utajärvi, Finland

A special type of water well may be constructed adjacent to freshwater lakes or streams. Commonly called a collector well but sometimes referred to by the trade name Ranney well or Ranney collector, this type of well involves sinking a caisson vertically below the top of the aquifer and then advancing lateral collectors out of the caisson and beneath the surface water body. Pumping from within the caisson induces infiltration of water from the surface water body into the aquifer, where it is collected by the collector well laterals and conveyed into the caisson where it can be pumped to the ground surface.

Two additional broad classes of well types may be distinguished, based on the use of the well:

- production or pumping wells, are large diameter (greater than 15 cm in diameter) cased (metal, plastic, or concrete) water wells, constructed for extracting water from the aquifer by a pump (if the well is not artesian).

Schematic diagram of a groundwater monitoring well

- monitoring wells or piezometers, are often smaller diameter wells used to monitor the hydraulic head or sample the groundwater for chemical constituents. Piezometers are monitoring wells completed over a very short section of aquifer. Monitoring wells can also be completed at multiple levels, allowing discrete samples or measurements to be made at different vertical elevations at the same map location.

A water well constructed for pumping groundwater can be used passively as a monitoring well and a small diameter well can be pumped, but this distinction by use is common.

== Siting ==
Before excavation, information about the geology, water table depth, seasonal fluctuations, recharge area and rate should be found if possible. This work can be done by a hydrogeologist, or a groundwater surveyor using a variety of tools including electro-seismic surveying, any available information from nearby wells, geologic maps, and sometimes geophysical imaging. These professionals provide advice that is almost as accurate a driller who has experience and knowledge of nearby wells/bores and the most suitable drilling technique based on the expected target depth.

== Contamination ==
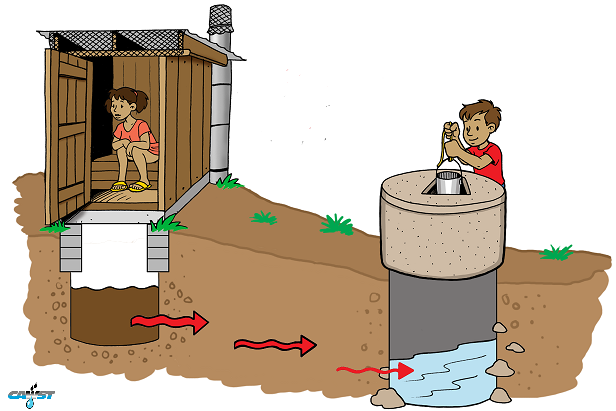
Waterborne diseases can be spread via a well which is contaminated with fecal pathogens from pit latrines.

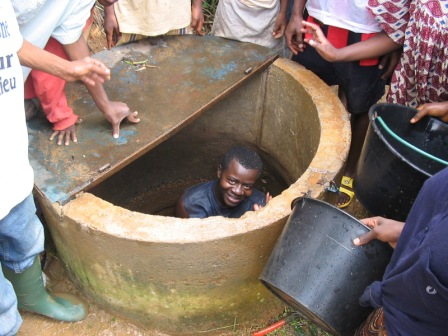
Man cleaning a well in Yaoundé, Cameroon

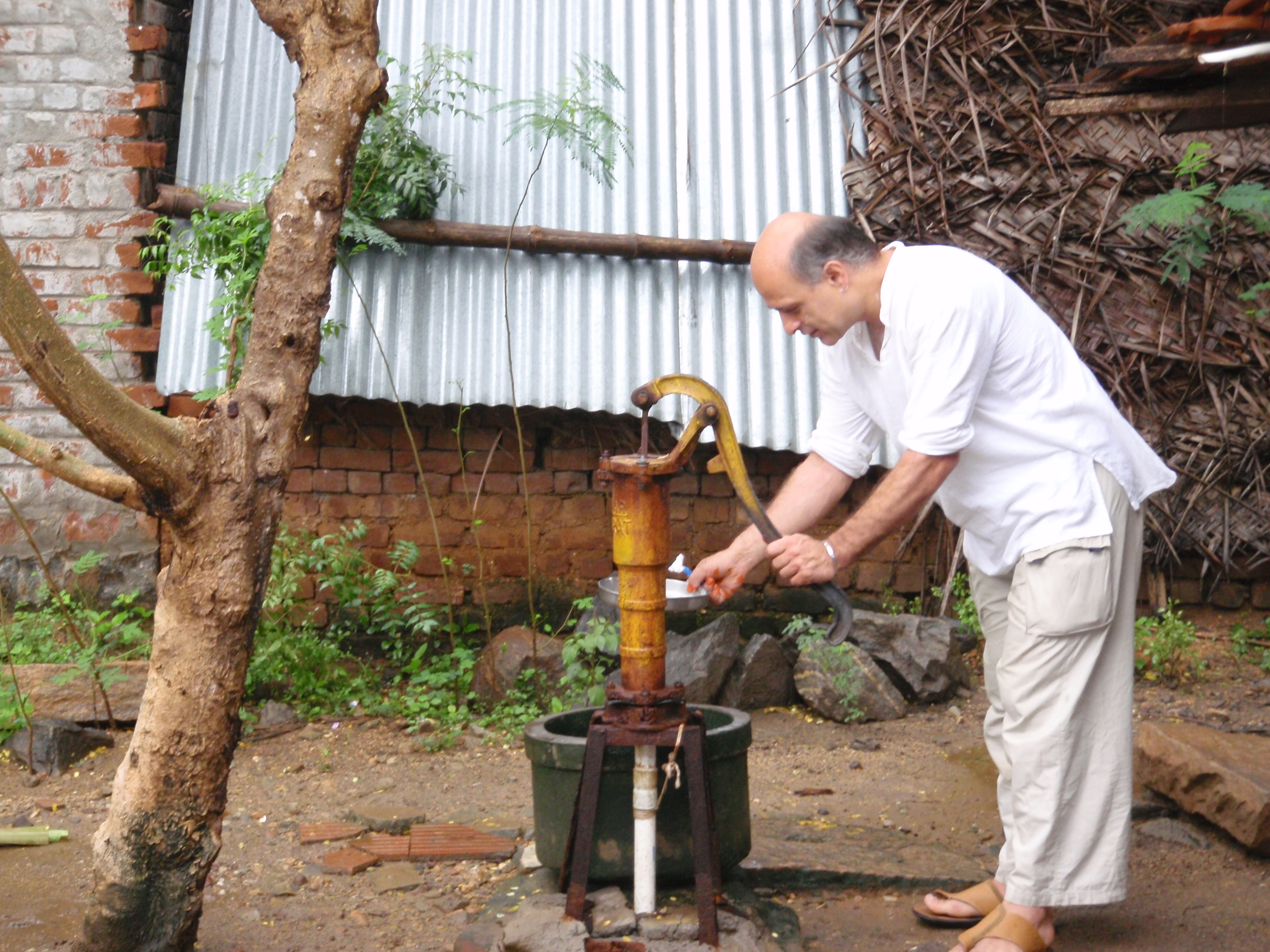
Hand pump to pump water from a well in a village near Chennai in India, where the well water might be polluted by nearby pit latrines.

Shallow pumping wells can often supply drinking water at a very low cost. However, impurities from the surface easily reach shallow sources, which leads to a greater risk of contamination for these wells compared to deeper wells. Contaminated wells can lead to the spread of various waterborne diseases. Dug and driven wells are relatively easy to contaminate; for instance, most dug wells are unreliable in the majority of the United States. Some research has found that, in cold regions, changes in river flow and flooding caused by extreme rainfall or snowmelt can degrade well water quality.

=== Pathogens ===
Most of the bacteria, viruses, parasites, and fungi that contaminate well water comes from fecal material from humans and other animals. Common bacterial contaminants include E. coli, Salmonella, Shigella, and Campylobacter jejuni. Common viral contaminants include norovirus, sapovirus, rotavirus, enteroviruses, and hepatitis A and E. Parasites include Giardia lamblia, Cryptosporidium, Cyclospora cayetanensis, and microsporidia.

=== Chemical contamination ===
Chemical contamination is a common problem with groundwater. Nitrates from sewage, sewage sludge or fertilizer are a particular problem for babies and young children. Pollutant chemicals include pesticides and volatile organic compounds from gasoline, dry-cleaning, the fuel additive methyl tert-butyl ether (MTBE), and perchlorate from rocket fuel, airbag inflators, and other artificial and natural sources.

Several minerals are also contaminants, including lead leached from brass fittings or old lead pipes, chromium VI from electroplating and other sources, naturally occurring arsenic, radon, and uranium—all of which can cause cancer—and naturally occurring fluoride, which is desirable in low quantities to prevent tooth decay, but can cause dental fluorosis in higher concentrations.

Some chemicals are commonly present in water wells at levels that are not toxic, but can cause other problems. Calcium and magnesium cause what is known as hard water, which can precipitate and clog pipes or burn out water heaters. Iron and manganese can appear as dark flecks that stain clothing and plumbing, and can promote the growth of iron and manganese bacteria that can form slimy black colonies that clog pipes.

=== Prevention ===
The quality of the well water can be significantly increased by lining the well, sealing the well head, fitting a self-priming hand pump, constructing an apron, ensuring the area is kept clean and free from stagnant water and animals, moving sources of contamination (pit latrines, garbage pits, on-site sewer systems) and carrying out hygiene education. The well should be cleaned with 1% chlorine solution after construction and periodically every 6 months.

Well holes should be covered to prevent loose debris, animals, animal excrement, and wind-blown foreign matter from falling into the hole and decomposing. The cover should be able to be in place at all times, including when drawing water from the well. A suspended roof over an open hole helps to some degree, but ideally the cover should be tight fitting and fully enclosing, with only a screened air vent.

Minimum distances and soil percolation requirements between sewage disposal sites and water wells need to be observed. Rules regarding the design and installation of private and municipal septic systems take all these factors into account so that nearby drinking water sources are protected.

Education of the general population in society also plays an important role in protecting drinking water.

=== Mitigation ===
Cleanup of contaminated groundwater tends to be very costly. Effective remediation of groundwater is generally very difficult. Contamination of groundwater from surface and subsurface sources can usually be dramatically reduced by correctly centering the casing during construction and filling the casing annulus with an appropriate sealing material. The sealing material (grout) should be placed from immediately above the production zone back to surface, because, in the absence of a correctly constructed casing seal, contaminated fluid can travel into the well through the casing annulus. Centering devices are important (usually one per length of casing or at maximum intervals of 9 m) to ensure that the grouted annular space is of even thickness.

Upon the construction of a new test well, it is considered best practice to invest in a complete battery of chemical and biological tests on the well water in question. Point-of-use treatment is available for individual properties and treatment plants are often constructed for municipal water supplies that suffer from contamination. Most of these treatment methods involve the filtration of the contaminants of concern, and additional protection may be garnered by installing well-casing screens only at depths where contamination is not present.

Wellwater for personal use is often filtered with reverse osmosis water processors; this process can remove very small particles. A simple, effective way of killing microorganisms is to bring the water to a full boil for one to three minutes, depending on location. A household well contaminated by microorganisms can initially be treated by shock chlorination using bleach, generating concentrations hundreds of times greater than found in community water systems; however, this will not fix any structural problems that led to the contamination and generally requires some expertise and testing for effective application.

After the filtration process, it is common to implement an ultraviolet (UV) system to kill pathogens in the water. UV light affects the DNA of the pathogen by UV-C photons breaking through the cell wall. UV disinfection has been gaining popularity in the past decades as it is a chemical-free method of water treatment.

== Environmental problems ==
A risk with the placement of water wells is soil salination which occurs when the water table of the soil begins to drop and salt begins to accumulate as the soil begins to dry out. Another environmental problem that is very prevalent in water well drilling is the potential for methane to seep through.

=== Soil salination ===
The potential for soil salination is a large risk when choosing the placement of water wells. Soil salination is caused when the water table of the soil drops over time and salt begins to accumulate. In turn, the increased amount of salt begins to dry the soil out. The increased level of salt in the soil can result in the degradation of soil and can be very harmful to vegetation.

=== Methane ===
Methane, an asphyxiant, is a chemical compound that is the main component of natural gas. When methane is introduced into a confined space, it displaces oxygen, reducing oxygen concentration to a level low enough to pose a threat to humans and other aerobic organisms but still high enough for a risk of spontaneous or externally caused explosion. This potential for explosion is what poses such a danger in regards to the drilling and placement of water wells.

Low levels of methane in drinking water are not considered toxic. When methane seeps into a water supply, it is commonly referred to as "methane migration". This can be caused by old natural gas wells near water well systems becoming abandoned and no longer monitored.

Over time, some of these wells and pumping systems may become less efficient and require suitable alternatives. Handpumps and treadle pumps can be used as replacements, while other options include self-dug wells and electric deep-well pumps, particularly where water needs to be drawn from greater depths. Organizations working in the field of appropriate technology, such as Practical Action, also provide practical guidance on building and installing handpumps and treadle pumps, allowing communities to adopt these solutions themselves.[1][2]

=== PFAS/PFOS Fire fighting foam ===
Per- and polyfluoroalkyl substances (PFAS or PFASs) are a group of synthetic organofluorine chemical compounds that have multiple fluorine atoms attached to an alkyl chain. PFAS are a group of "forever chemicals" that spread very quickly and very far in ground water polluting it permanently. Water wells near certain airports where any foam fire fighting or training activities occurred up to 2010 are likely to be contaminated by PFAS.

== Water security ==
A study concluded that of ~39 million groundwater wells, 9-20% are at high risk of running dry if local groundwater levels decline by less than five meters, or – as with many areas and possibly more than half of major aquifers – continue to decline.

== Society and culture ==
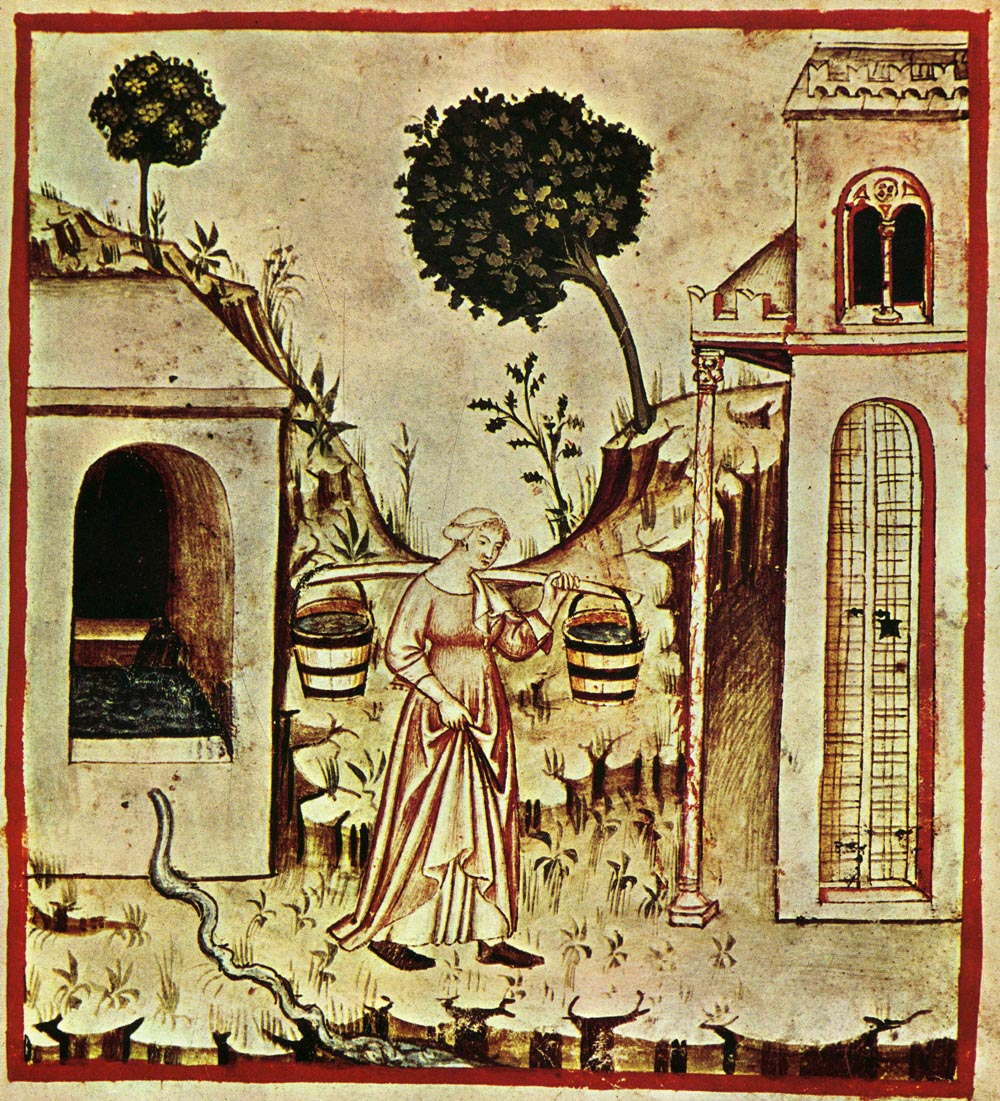
Water use, Tacuinum Sanitatis, Biblioteca Casanatense (14th century)

Springs and wells have had cultural significance since prehistoric times, leading to the foundation of towns such as Wells and Bath in Somerset. Interest in health benefits led to the growth of spa towns including many with wells in their name, examples being Llandrindod Wells and Royal Tunbridge Wells.

Eratosthenes is sometimes claimed to have used a well in his calculation of the Earth's circumference; however, this is just a simplification used in a shorter explanation of Cleomedes, since Eratosthenes had used a more elaborate and precise method.

Many incidents in the Bible take place around wells, such as the finding of a wife for Isaac in Genesis and Jesus's talk with the Samaritan woman in the Gospels.

== Model for water well recovery ==
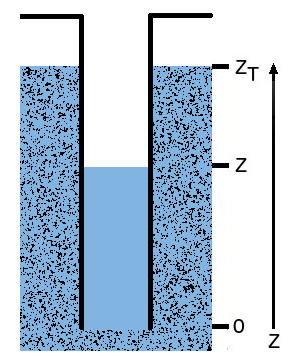
Diagram of a water well partially filled to level z with the top of the aquifer at z_{T}

For a well with impermeable walls, the water in the well is resupplied from the bottom of the well. The rate at which water flows into the well will depend on the pressure difference between the ground water at the well bottom and the well water at the well bottom. The pressure of a column of water of height z will be equal to the weight of the water in the column divided by the cross-sectional area of the column, so the pressure of the ground water a distance z_{T} below the top of the water table will be:

$$P_g=\rho \,g \,z_T$$

where ρ is the mass density of the water and g is the acceleration due to gravity. When the water in the well is below the water table level, the pressure at the bottom of the well due to the water in the well will be less than P_{g} and water will be forced into the well. Referring to the diagram, if z is the distance from the bottom of the well to the well water level and z_{T} is the distance from the bottom of the well to the top of the water table, the pressure difference will be:

$$\Delta P=\rho\, g\, (z_T-z)$$

Applying Darcy's law, the volume rate (F) at which water is forced into the well will be proportional to this pressure difference:

$$\Delta P=R\, F$$

where R is the resistance to the flow, which depends on the well cross section, the pressure gradient at the bottom of the well, and the characteristics of the substrate at the well bottom. (e.g., porosity). The volume flow rate into the well can be written as a function of the rate of change of the well water level:

$$F=A \frac{dz}{dt}$$

Combining the above three equations yields a simple differential equation in z:

$$R A \frac{dz}{dt} = \rho g(z_T-z)$$

which may be solved:

$$z = z_T -(z_T-z_0)e^{-t/\tau}$$

where z_{0} is the well water level at time t=0 and τ is the well time constant:

$$\tau = \frac{R A}{\rho g}$$

Note that if dz/dt for a depleted well can be measured, it will be equal to $z_T/\tau$ and the time constant τ can be calculated. According to the above model, it will take an infinite amount of time for a well to fully recover, but if we consider a well that is 99% recovered to be "practically" recovered, the time for a well to practically recover from a level at z will be:

$$T_r = \tau \ln\left(\frac{1-z/z_T}{1-0.99}\right)$$

For a well that is fully depleted (z=0) it would take a time of about 4.6 τ to practically recover.

The above model does not take into account the depletion of the aquifer due to the pumping which lowered the well water level (See aquifer test and groundwater flow equation). Also, practical wells may have impermeable walls only up to, but not including the bedrock, which will give a larger surface area for water to enter the well.

== Similar and related water structures ==
- Types of ancient wells
  - Brick-lined well
  - Castle well, for use in the castle
  - Cistern, ancient Greek
  - Stepwell, ancient India
- Modern construction techniques
  - Baptist well drilling, simple technique
  - Rodriguez well, for harvesting drinking water in polar regions
  - Spring supply, piped water supply from the well
- Uses
  - Holy well, sacred wells in various religions
    - Abraham's well, sacred well in Israel
    - Ghat, sacred in Hinduism and Buddhism
  - Drainage and irrigation
    - Drainage by wells
    - Shadoof, an irrigation tool that is used to lift water from a water source onto land or into another waterway or basin
  - Washing
    - Lavoir, public place for washing clothes.

== See also ==
- Fossil water
- History of water supply and sanitation
- Johad § Similar waterbodies - Ancient water conservation techniques
- Self-supply of water and sanitation
