= Odlum =

Odlum is a surname. Notable people with the surname include:

- Charlotte Smith (activist) (1840–1917), née Odlum, American reformer, women's rights activist and editor
- Dave Odlum, Irish musician
- Dean Odlum, Irish Gaelic footballer
- Doris Odlum (1890–1985), British psychiatrist
- Edward Faraday Odlum (1850–1935), Canadian geologist, educator and businessman
- Floyd Odlum (1892–1976), American lawyer and industrialist
- George Odlum (1934–2003), Saint Lucian politician
- Hortense Odlum (1892–1970), American businesswomen
- Jon Odlum (1936–2013), Saint Lucian politician
- Robert Emmet Odlum (1851–1885), American swimming instructor
- Victor Odlum (1880–1971), Canadian diplomat and officer

== See also ==
- Odlums Group
