= Jessie Franklin Turner =

American fashion designer (1881-1956)

- Jessie Franklin Turner in 1954.
- Born: Jessie Franklin Turner; 10 December 1881; St. Louis, Missouri
- Died: 1956 (aged 74-75)
- Labels: Jessie Frankiin Turner; Winifred Warren Inc.
- Spouse: Charles Hiram Ferguson
- Parent(s): Richard Major Turner; Louise Pullen Franklin.

Jessie Franklin Turner (10 December 1881 – 1956) was an American fashion designer based in New York in the early 20th century. She was notable for being one of the first American designers to create unique designs, rather than imitating or copying Paris fashions, and was the first American fashion designer to establish a long-term couture business in New York.

== Personal life ==
Franklin Turner stated that she was born in St. Louis in Missouri, to Richard Major Turner of Wheeling, West Virginia, and Louise Pullen Franklin of Plymouth, Massachusetts on 10 December 1881, although Morris de Camp Crawford presented her as being a Virginian native from the state's tidewater region when promoting her alongside other American textile and fashion designers in his 1916-1922 "Made in America" campaign. After Turner's birth, their parents moved to Peoria, Illinois. She was trained in singing, painting, and sculpture when she was a child. She attended sculpting classes at the Paris studio of sculptor Antoine Bourdelle. Turner studied high school education at Berkeley School in Peoria.

In chapter 3 of the 1955 Patrick Dennis novel, Auntie Mame: An Irreverent Escapade, it is winter 1931 and Jessie Franklin Turner is a character that hires the fictitious Auntie Mame as a saleswoman to work in her shop.

She married Charles Hiram Ferguson, but retained her maiden name professionally. She died in 1956.

== Career ==
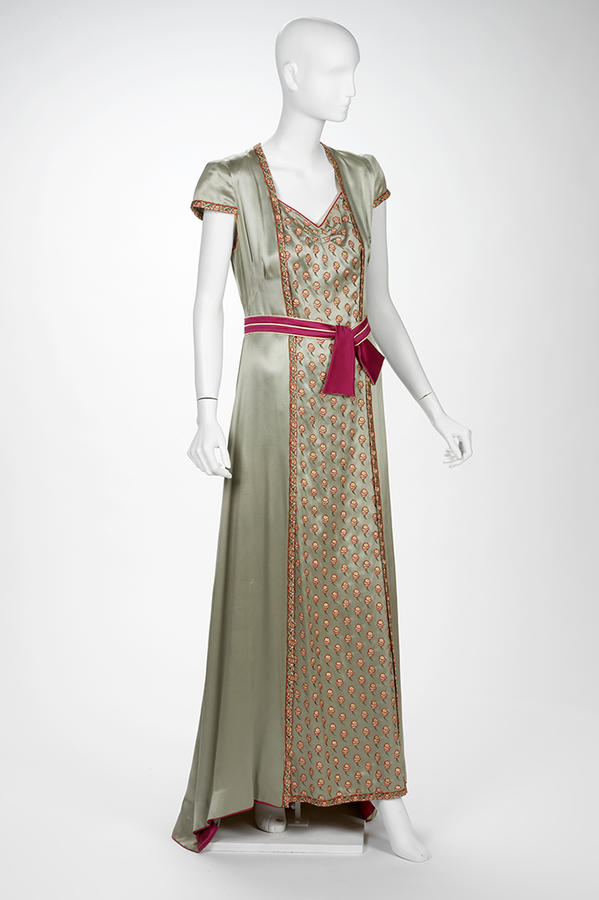
Jessie Franklin Turner tea gown, 1935 (RISD Museum)

When Turner was a teenager, she was employed in a local lingerie store called Fischer Brothers, where she suggested to the owner that she could improve the quality and range of their merchandise. Following this, she became a buyer for the lingerie department at the St. Louis department store Scruggs, Vandervoort and Barney. In 1908, Turner was hired as the European buyer for the firm McCutcheon & Co.'s "The Linen Store", which allowed her to learn more about lingerie and textiles.

In 1911, Paul Bonwit hired Turner as a European and Oriental goods buyer for Bonwit Teller between 1916 and 1918. Between 1913 and 1915 Bonwit deployed Turner to the Philippines to supervise a handmade lingerie factory there. In 1918, Turner went on to design for Bonwit Teller's custom salon under the name of Winifred Warren Inc. In 1919 the American Museum of Natural History featured a selection of 'Winifred Warren' teagowns and lingerie for Bonwit Teller in their Exhibition of Industrial Art in Textiles and Costumes.

Franklin Turner's shop, which she opened in 1923, was based at 410 Park Avenue, New York. Developing her work by directly draping on a model, Franklin Turner was known particularly for flowing tea gowns and exotic evening dresses, often made in fabrics of her own design. In 1923 she acknowledged the influence of historical and ethnographic textiles in the Brooklyn Museum's collections on many of her most successful designs. These influences continued throughout her career. In 1938, a day dress based on an Ainu coat was exhibited alongside the original coat in the second annual exhibition of New York's Museum of Costume Art. Franklin Turner was one of the directors of this museum, which was located in the Rockefeller Center on the fourth floor.

In 1923 Paul Poiret was quoted as having declared Franklin Turner "the only designer of genius in the United States." When the designer Elizabeth Hawes returned to New York in 1928 to launch her American couture house, she noted that Jessie Franklin Turner was possibly the only American dressmaker at that time to offer high end clothing that was completely her own work, and not made in imitation of Paris fashions.

Although Franklin Turner reportedly never met any of her clients, she was known for her unique and striking clothing for individualistic dressers such as the textile designer Dorothy Liebes and the socialite and fashion icon Millicent Rogers. She retired in 1943.

== Exhibitions ==
- 1919: Exhibition of Industrial Art in Textiles and Costumes, American Museum of Natural History. Selection of 'Winifred Warren' teagowns and lingerie designed for Bonwit Teller.
- 1938: Second annual exhibition at New York's Museum of Costume Art. Ainu-inspired day dress.
- 1942: Renaissance in Fashions, 1942 at the Metropolitan Museum of Art. Velvet and brocade teagown.
- 2013-14 An American Style, Bard Graduate Center. The 1919 AMNH exhibition revisited.

Garments by Jessie Franklin Turner are in the permanent collection of the Metropolitan Museum of Art's Costume Institute, the Art Institute of Chicago, and the Rhode Island School of Design Museum.
