= Paul Bonwit =

American businessman (1862–1939)

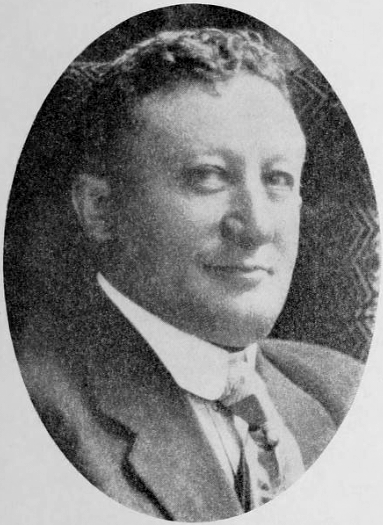
- Born: September 29, 1862; Hanover, Kingdom of Hanover
- Died: December 11, 1939 (aged 77); New York City, US
- Occupation: Founder of Bonwit Teller department store
- Spouse: Sarah Woolf

Paul Joseph (Josef) Bonwit (September 29, 1862 – December 11, 1939) was a Kingdom of Hanover-born American businessman. He was the founder of Bonwit Teller department store in New York City. Bonwit controlled the company bearing his name from its founding in 1895 until its sale in 1934.

== Personal life ==
Bonwit was born near Hanover, Kingdom of Hanover, the son of Bernard Bonwit. At the age of 16, he moved to Paris, where he found work with a local export house as a clerk and continued his studies at night. In 1883, at age 21, he emigrated to the United States, locating at first in Lincoln, Nebraska, where he worked in a department store. He moved to New York City for a job with Rothschild & Company, which was renamed Bonwit, Rothschild & Company when he later became a partner. He eventually settled in New York. He married Rebecca Woolf Bonwit (1869–1934) in 1893 and they had two sons, Harold Woolf Bonwit (1896–1950) and Walter B. Bonwit (1901–1984).

== Bonwit Teller ==
Wanting his own business, Bonwit established a store in New York at Sixth Avenue and Eighteenth Street in 1895. Two years later Edmund D. Teller and he relocated their establishment (then known as Bonwit Teller) to Sixth Avenue and Twenty-third Street. The partners incorporated their firm in 1907 as Bonwit Teller & Company and in 1911 relocated yet again, this time to the corner of Fifth Avenue and Thirty-eighth Street.

In 1930 Bonwit chose a new address farther north on Fifth Avenue – the former A.T. Stewart & Company building at Fifty-sixth Street. In 1931, the company drew the attention of noted financier Floyd Odlum who made a significant investment into the company. Bonwit agreed to let Odlum's wife Hortense serve as a consultant to the company in 1932. Two years later, dogged by poor health and saddened by the death of his wife, Bonwit sold the firm to Odlum's Atlas Corporation. Odlum promptly named his wife as the new president (she was the first woman to hold such a position in New York), with Bonwit's son Walter Bonwit staying on as vice president and general manager.

The company enjoyed success under the direction of the Odlums. In May 1979, the developer Donald Trump acquired and later, in 1979, demolished the Fifth Avenue store in order to make room for the Trump Tower. Bonwit Teller would change ownership several times throughout the 1970s and 1980s. In 1989, its parent company at the time filed for bankruptcy protection, liquidating most of the company in 1990.

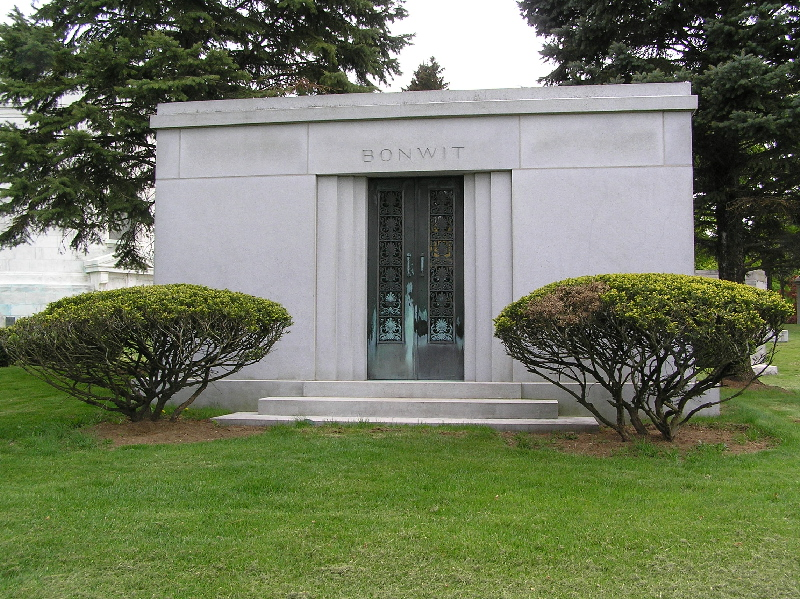
The mausoleum of Paul Bonwit in Kensico Cemetery

During his business career, Bonwit sat on the boards of both Harriman National Bank and A. Sulka & Company, while he also maintained an active interest in philanthropies and the arts.

Paul J. Bonwit died in Manhattan in 1939 after a brief illness and is interred in a private mausoleum in Kensico Cemetery in Valhalla, New York.
