= Pine Glen =

Pine Glen may refer to:

- Pine Glen, Pennsylvania, United States
- Pine Glen, New Brunswick, Canada

== See also ==
- Pine Glenn Cove, Utah, United States
- Glen Pine, American musician
