= Vernon Hills Village =

Shopping center in Eastchester, New York, United States

Coordinates: 40°58′15″N 73°48′17″W

Vernon Hills Village, formerly the Vernon Hills Shopping Center is a 380,000 sq ft (35,303 m^{2}) shopping center in Eastchester, New York near Scarsdale and about 5 mi (8 km) from downtown White Plains, in Westchester County.

Officially not part of the shopping center but immediately adjacent a former branch of Lord & Taylor which preceded the shopping center, opening in 1947, and operating for 73 years through 2020. Since 2022 a Saks Off Fifth store is located there.

== History ==
=== Lord & Taylor freestanding store ===
On February 25, 1948, the Lord & Taylor-Westchester store opened with floodlights, models, and 70 mannikins, to large crowds, with 18,000 visitors in total that day, and the worst traffic jams that that community had experienced for years. The store on a 14-acre site, provided parking for 1040 cars, and the store employed around 300 people.

=== Shopping center addition ===
In 1955, Mount Vernon, New York-based developer Salvatore Pepe released plans to build shopping center on the 9-acre (3.6 ha) parcel next to Lord & Taylor, promoting it as the future "Fifth Avenue of Westchester" and already envisioning luxury department store Bonwit Teller as the anchor, more than a decade before Bonwit's would actually move from White Plains to Vernon Hills in 1967.

=== Bonwit Teller ===
In 1964 Bonwit Teller had branch store in a two-and‐a‐half‐story building in downtown White Plains, where it had operated since April 1941, on the current site of the Westchester One tower. Bonwit had a 20‐year lease ending in 1976, but Pepe went to the landlord Archie Davidow and bought it, including the remainder of the lease, thus permitting Bonwits to move; it ceased operations at White Plains at the close of business on April 13, 1967.

Five days later, on April 18, 1967, the new 43,000 sq ft (3,995 m^{2}), Bonwit Teller Scarsdale store opened. Guests included actress Arlene Francis (member of the company's Board of Directors), Princess Marcella Borghese and Mildred Custin, president of Bonwit Teller. Designed by architectural firm Copeland, Novak & Israel, it consisted of 36 fashion departments, and featured a 7,900 sq ft (734 m^{2}) center court of Italian marble, with a crystal chandelier hanging above. Two additional chandeliers had once hung in the Ambassador Hotel in New York. 1,700 ft (518 m) of murals by Richard Neas decorated the walls of the court, and additional Neas murals adorned the shoe salon. 85 employees from the White Plains store were transferred to Vernon Hills, and 40 additional employees were hired specifically for the new branch.

=== Sale to Ashkenazy ===
In 2019 owner and developer Bianco & Pepe Inc. sold the center to Ashkenazy Acquisition.

== Current tenants ==
As of 2023, tenants include Saks Off Fifth (38,000 sq ft (3,530 m^{2})), New York Sports Club, Starbucks, Barnes & Noble (opened in 2016), West Elm, Gap, Banana Republic and Athleta.
