= Swell Hogan =

- Written by: Ralph Graves
- Produced by: Howard Hughes
- Starring: Ralph Graves
- Country: United States
- Language: Silent
- Budget: $80,000

Swell Hogan is an unreleased 1926 American film written by and starring Ralph Graves. A sentimental comedy, it is about a Bowery bum who helps orphans.

The film was financed by Howard Hughes and was his first production. Sources differ as to whether Hughes did or did not direct it. IMDb credits Graves as the director.

Graves persuaded Hughes to put up the money, claiming that it would only take $40,000. In the end, it cost double that amount. After the film was completed, Hughes screened the finished product several times and thought it was a disaster; his uncle Rupert Hughes, a film director and screenwriter, confirmed that opinion. Hughes is believed to have ordered the film to be destroyed.
