= Atlas Corporation =

American investment company

- Industry: activities of holding companies financial service activities, except insurance and pension funding
- Founded: 1928; United States
- Headquarters: United States

The Atlas Corporation is an American investment firm that was formed in 1928.

== History ==
Atlas corporation was formed in 1928, in a merger of the United Corporation, an investment firm started in 1923 with $40,000, with Atlas Utilities and Investors Ltd. The corporation specialized in capital formation and management. In 1929, Atlas was a $12,550,000 investment trust. The company was able to shrewdly weather the Wall Street crash of 1929, and continue to grow through the 1930s and 1940s. The corporation was founded by Floyd Odlum and his brother-in-law Boyd Hatch.

With Floyd Odlum as president and Boyd Hatch as vice-president, Atlas invested, managed or controlled numerous industries, including Greyhound Lines, Bonwit Teller (acquired 1934) and Franklin Simon & Co. (acquired 1936) ladies' apparel stores, Madison Square Garden, and various mines, utility companies, aviation related businesses, and banks. After Atlas Corporation acquired the Bonwit Teller ladies' apparel stores, Floyd Odlum convinced his wife, Hortense Odlum, to become involved in the store's operations. She became the first female president of a major department store chain when she became president of Bonwit Teller in 1934.

Atlas acquired aircraft manufacturer and budding aerospace contractor Consolidated Vultee Aircraft Corporation (later Convair) from AVCO in 1947. The Atlas Missile program gained the name of the Atlas Corporation in 1951, which went on to become both America’s first ICBM and used in the Mercury missions to send astronauts into orbit.

In 1948, Howard Hughes acquired controlling interest in RKO Pictures from Atlas.

Today, the company has ownership in natural resources investments.
