= Jon Odlum =

Saint Lucian politician

- Born: May 9, 1936 (age 90)
- Died: February 19, 2013 (aged 76)
- Occupation: Politician
- Political party: Progressive Labor Party

Stanley Nicholas Jon Odlum (9 May 1936 – 19 February 2013) was a Saint Lucian politician. Originated from the Saint Lucia Labour Party. Was also a member of the now defunct Progressive Labor Party, led by his brother George Odlum, he was the party's sole successful Parliamentary candidate in 1982. He was made a Parliamentary Secretary in the Ministry of Health, Human Services and Family Affairs on 10 December 2001.

In the early 1970s he wrote sports reports for the "Voice of St Lucia" newspaper, and also gave weekly sports summaries on television. Later he became the Minister for Sport.
