= Bonwit Teller =

American luxury department store

Bonwit Teller & Co.

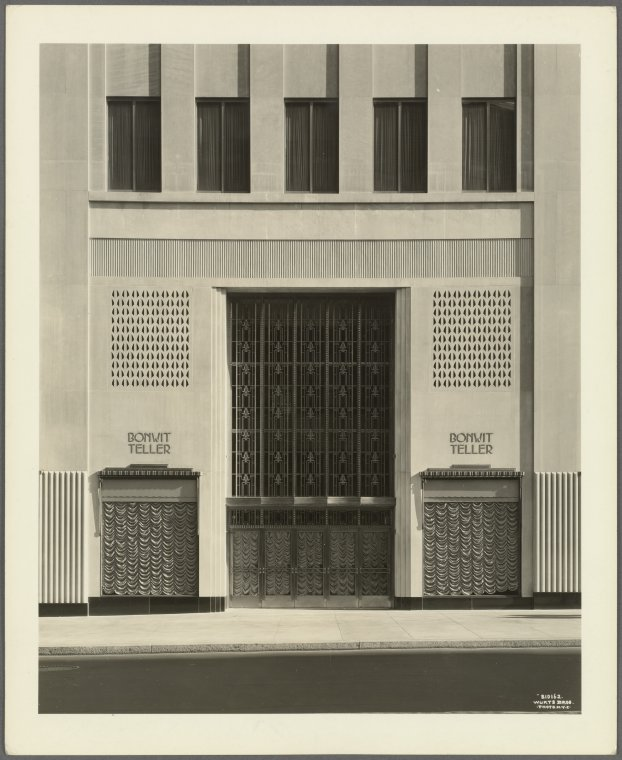
- The New York City flagship in the 1930s
- Company type: Department store
- Industry: Retail
- Founded: 1895 (131 years ago), New York City, U.S.
- Defunct: 2000
- Fate: Bankruptcy (2000)
- Headquarters: New York City, U.S.
- Products: Clothing, footwear, bedding, furniture, jewelry, beauty products, and housewares
- Website: bonwitteller.com

Bonwit Teller & Co. was an American luxury department store in New York City, founded by Paul Bonwit in 1895 at Sixth Avenue and 18th Street, and later a chain of luxury department stores.

In 1897, Edmund D. Teller was admitted to the partnership and the store moved to 23rd Street, east of Sixth Avenue.

Bonwit specialized in high-end women's apparel at a time when many of its competitors were diversifying their product lines, and Bonwit Teller became noted within the trade for the quality of its merchandise as well as the above-average salaries paid to both buyers and executives.

The partnership was incorporated in 1907 and the store moved to the corner of Fifth Avenue and 38th Street.

Throughout much of the 20th century, Bonwit was one of a group of upscale department stores on Fifth Avenue that catered to the "carriage trade". Among its most notable peers were Lord & Taylor, and Saks Fifth Avenue.

== Distinctive features ==
The Bonwit Teller's flagship uptown building at Fifth Avenue and 56th Street, originally known as Stewart & Company, was a women's clothing store in the "new luxury retailing district", designed by Whitney Warren and Charles Wetmore, and opened on October 16, 1929, with Eleanor Roosevelt in attendance. It was described by The New York Times as a 12-story emporium of "severe, almost unornamented limestone climbing to a ziggurat of setbacks"—as an "antithesis" of the nearby "conventional 1928 Bergdorf Goodman Building.

The "stupendously luxurious" entrance sharply contrasted the severity of the building itself. The entrance was "like a spilled casket of gems: platinum, bronze, hammered aluminum, orange and yellow faience, and tinted glass backlighted at night" The American Architect magazine described it in 1929 as "a sparkling jewel in keeping with the character of the store."

Originally, the "interior of Stewart & Company was just as opulent as the entrance: murals, decorative painting, and a forest of woods: satinwood, butternut, walnut, cherry, rosewood, bubinga, maple, ebony, red mahogany and Persian oak." But after Bonwit Teller took over the store in April 1930, the architect Ely Jacques Kahn stripped the interior of its decorations.

Two more floors were added to the main building in 1938 and a twelve-story addition was made to the 56th Street frontage in 1939.

Over time, the 15-foot tall (4.6 m) limestone relief panels, depicting nearly nude women dancing, at the top of the Fifth Avenue facade, became a "Bonwit Teller signature". Donald Trump, who purchased the building thanks to Genesco's CEO John L. Hanigan, wanted to begin demolition in 1980. Trump "promised the limestone reliefs" to the Metropolitan Museum of Art. When they were "jackhammered" "to bits", the act was condemned. Trump said that his company had obtained three independent appraisals of the sculptures, which had found them to be "without artistic merit". An official at the Metropolitan Museum of Art disputed the statement, stating: "Can you imagine the museum accepting them if they were not of artistic merit? Architectural sculpture of this quality is rare and would have made definite sense in our collection."

== History ==
=== Founding and early history (1880s–1946) ===
In the late 1880s, Paul Bonwit opened a small millinery shop at Sixth Avenue and 18th Street in Manhattan's Ladies' Mile shopping district. In 1895, which the company often referred to as the year it was founded, Bonwit opened another store on Sixth Avenue just four blocks uptown. When Bonwit's original business failed, Bonwit bought out his partner and opened a new store with Edmund D. Teller in 1898 on 23d Street between Fifth and Sixth Avenues. The firm was incorporated in 1907 as Bonwit Teller & Company and in 1911 relocated yet again, this time to the corner of Fifth Avenue and Thirty-eighth Street.

Bonwit Teller from an advertisement ca. 1920

They announced that this new location would provide consumers with:

an uncommon display of wearing apparel from foreign and domestic sources . . . which will appeal to those who desire the unusual and exclusive at moderate prices.

In 1930, with the retail trade in New York City moving uptown, the store moved again, this time to a new address on Fifth Avenue. Bonwit took up residence in the former Stewart & Co. building at Fifty-sixth Street, which would remain the company's flagship store for nearly fifty years. The building had been designed by the architectural firm Warren and Wetmore in 1929 and redesigned the next year by Ely Jacques Kahn for Bonwit.

The company, in need of capital, partnered with noted financier Floyd Odlum. Odlum, who had cashed in his stock holdings just prior to the stock market crash of 1929, was investing in firms in financial distress and in 1934 Odlum's Atlas Corporation acquired Bonwit Teller. Odlum's wife, Hortense, who had already been serving as a consultant, was named president of Bonwit Teller in 1934, making her the first female president of a major department store in the United States. The Odlums also retained a connection to the firm's founding family, naming Paul Bonwit's son Walter Bonwit as vice president and general manager.

For a brief time in 1939–1940, the store owned radio station WHAT in Philadelphia.

=== Changing ownership (1946–1979) ===
Floyd and Hortense Odlum would sell their investment in Bonwit Teller to Walter Hoving's Hoving Corporation. With Bonwit Teller, Hoving would establish a strong retail presence on Fifth Avenue that would also include Tiffany & Co.

According to Fintan O'Toole, writing in The New York Review of Books in the mid-20th century, the artists Jasper Johns, Robert Rauschenberg, and Andy Warhol all worked at Bonwit Teller as window dressers (creating window displays).

The company would undergo another ownership change just ten years later with the acquisition of Bonwit by Genesco in 1956. At the time, Genesco was a large conglomerate operating 64 apparel and retail companies. While Genesco's portfolio included other upscale brands, including Henri Bendel, the company was largely known as a shoe retailer. Bonwit Teller, which had developed a cutting-edge reputation promoting a young Christian Dior and other prominent American designers, gained momentum in its fashion and sales during the mid-1960s following the acquisition by Genesco.

=== Branch location years ===
Bonwit Teller began to expand in 1908 with a branch at 13th and Chestnut Streets in Philadelphia. The store remained at this location until March 1928 when it moved four blocks west on Chestnut to 17th Street. It opened "season branches" in Miami in 1918 and Palm Beach in 1935

In 1926, the company established its first permanent Florida store in Tampa. In 1941 it opened a full-time branch in White Plains. This was followed by a store in Boston's Back Bay neighborhood in September 1947; stores in Cleveland and Chicago in 1949. By 1960, the company operated these stores as well as Manhasset; Wynnewood and Jenkintown, Pennsylvania and the small resort shops in Miami and Palm Beach.

In 1961, the company built a store in Short Hills and relocated its White Plains store next to a large Lord & Taylor in Scarsdale. A store in Oak Brook, Illinois followed in March 1962; The chain expanded to Beverly Hills in 1972, Bal Harbour; Palm Desert in 1983; Kansas City in 1984; Buffalo, and Columbia, South Carolina.

From the mid-1970s to late-1980s, Bonwit competed head-on with peer Saks Fifth Avenue, retaining a role on the development of fashion and design, most notably helping to launch the career of Calvin Klein.

==== Westchester County stores ====
In 1964 Bonwit Teller had branch store in a two-and-a-half-story building in downtown White Plains, where it had operated since April 1941, on the current site of the Westchester One tower. Bonwit had a 20-year lease ending in 1976, but local developer Salvatore Pepe wanted Bonwits to move to the Vernon Hills Shopping Center, which he had developed 5 miles (8.0 km) away in Eastchester near Scarsdale. Pepe went to landlord Archie Davidow and bought the property, including the remainder of the lease, thus permitting Bonwits to move; it ceased operations at White Plains at the close of business on April 13, 1967. Five days later, on April 18, 1967, the new 43,000 sq ft (3,995 m^{2}) Bonwit Teller Scarsdale store opened. Guests included actress Arlene Francis (member of the company's board of directors), Princess Marcella Borghese and Mildred Custin, president of Bonwit Teller. Designed by Copeland, Novak & Israel, it consisted of 36 fashion departments, and featured a 7,900 sq ft (734 m^{2}) center court of Italian marble, with a crystal chandelier hanging above. Two additional chandeliers had once hung in the Ambassador Hotel in New York. 1,700 ft (518 m) of murals by artist Richard Neas decorated the walls of the court, and additional Neas murals adorned the shoe salon. In addition to 40 staff hired specifically for the Vernon Hills store, 85 employees from White Plains transferred to the new store.

=== Growth and later history (1979–2000) ===
In 1979, Allied Stores Corporation acquired the company. Its storied flagship Fifth Avenue store was planned to be rebuilt there opposite the new Trump Tower. Bonwit Teller reopened its store in April 1981 now on 57th Street as the new flagship would be the centerstone to Trump Tower's indoor mall.

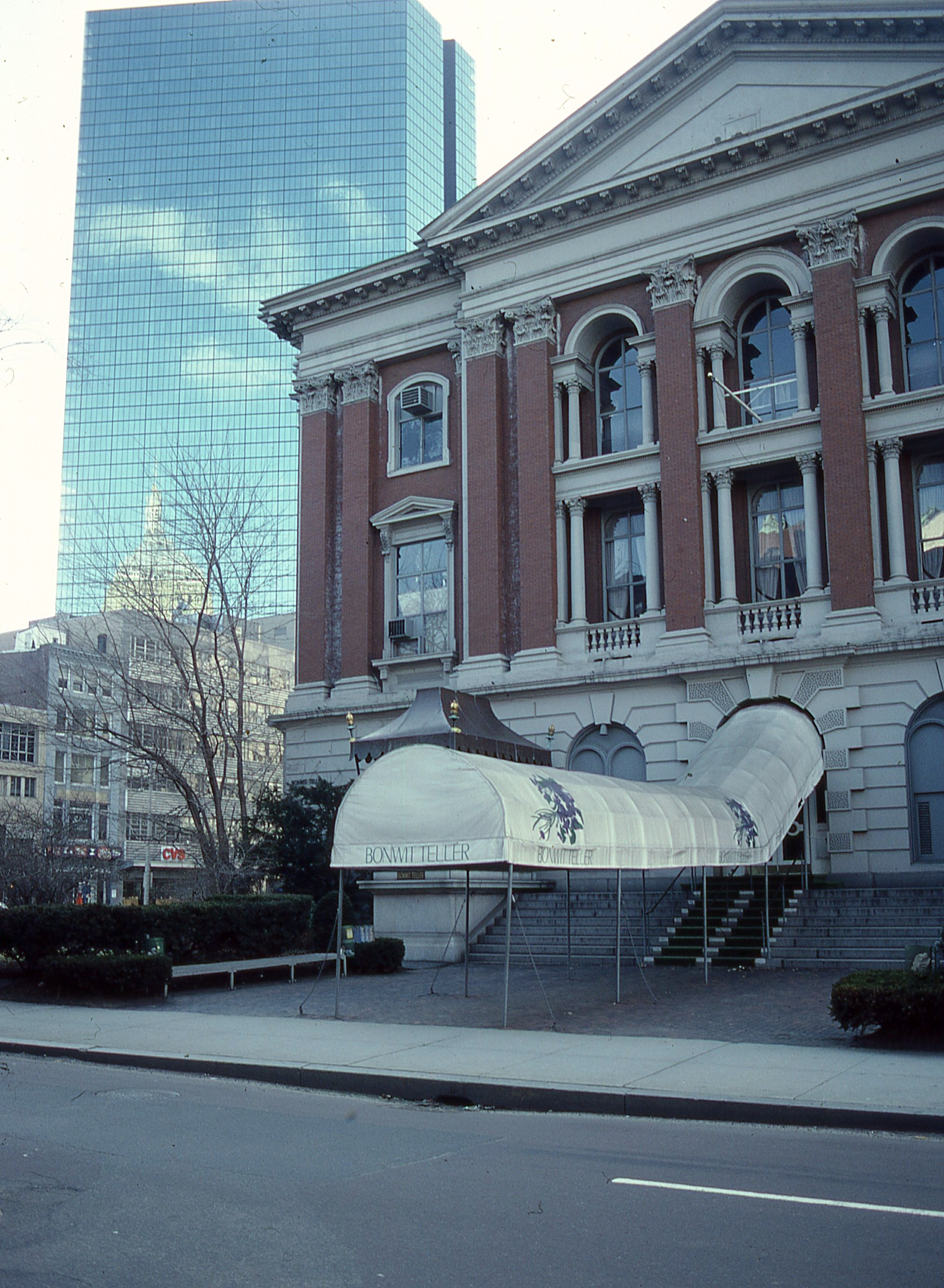
Bonwit Teller in Boston's Back Bay now houses a Restoration Hardware store.

In 1987, Allied Stores Corporation sold Bonwit Teller for $101 million to Hooker Corporation, an Australian business. Hooker would expand the company's store base from five to sixteen during the period.

In 1989, Bonwit was put on the auction block after the LJ Hooker filed for Chapter 11 Bankruptcy. Under the bankruptcy two stores in Cincinnati & Columbia continued to be operated by Hooker Corp under a license whilst five stores (Boston, Buffalo, Manhasset and Short Hills) and the Bonwit Teller name were purchased by The Pyramid Company. The flagship store in Manhattan closed as part of the deal and left the space vacant until a Galeries Lafayette opened in the building in 1991 which now had a new interior and facade. Due to poor sales the Galleries Lafayette closed in 1994.

After The Pyramid Company purchased Bonwit Teller from Hooker in 1990 and opened a store at the Carousel Center complex in Syracuse, New York. During the mid-1990s, a Manhattan branch was shopped around. The venerable institution filed Chapter 11 bankruptcy in March 2000 after heightened debt, the last store open was the Carousel Center location.

=== Since 2000 ===
In 2005, River West Brands, a Chicago-based brand revitalization company, announced it had formed Avenue Brands LLC to bring back Bonwit Teller.

In June 2008, River West announced that Bonwit Teller would be opening with eventually as many as twenty locations, beginning with New York and Los Angeles. Perhaps due to the subsequent recession, this venture never materialized.

In March 2020, NBT Holdings, a subsidiary of Sugar23, announced it had acquired the rights to the brand and announced that it was planning to bring the store back.
