= Pine Glenn Cove =

- Hatch's Camp
- U.S. National Register of Historic Places
- Location within Utah Location within the United States
- Location: 8.3 mi. E from mouth of Logan Canyon, Cache National Forest, Utah
- Coordinates: 41°46′32″N 111°38′57″W
- Area: 2.6 acres (1.1 ha)
- Built: 1922
- Architectural style: Bungalow/Craftsman, NPS Rustic
- NRHP reference No.: 06001192
- Added to NRHP: December 27, 2006

Pine Glenn Cove is a private vacation retreat, also known by various other names, including Hatch's Camp, Forest Hills, the Nunnery and St. Anne's Retreat. The property is located in Logan Canyon, Utah. Pine Glenn Cove is the largest private retreat in Cache National Forest and Logan Canyon, and the only one with a swimming pool. It has a long, rich history. Started by a wealthy businessman in the early 1910s, it was later expanded by his descendants. It was most famously owned by the Catholic Church in the later half of the 20th century and used as a spiritual retreat for nuns.

Much folklore surrounds the camp, citing tales of pregnant nuns, infanticide, satanic worship, and hell-hounds. The camp made it on national headlines in October 1997 when 2 different groups of teenagers (one group of 8 and one group of 30 later in the night) were herded into the empty swimming pool, tied up, and harassed by three shotgun wielding watchmen. Hatch's Camp was placed on the National Register of Historic Places on December 27, 2006. The camp is privately owned and in a restoration process to be opened up to the public at a future date. St. Ann's Retreat is allegedly haunted and it was featured on an episode of Travel Channel's Ghost Adventures.

== History ==
The site was originally developed in 1910 by Hezekiah Eastman Hatch (1855-1928), a prominent Logan, Utah businessman who built the first cabin there between 1915 and 1918. He built the cabin for his wife Georgia Thatcher Hatch, who enjoyed the cabin in her later years. After her death in 1919, their son Lorenzo Boyd Hatch took over the camp. He and his brother-in-law Floyd B. Odlum expanded the camp. They were self-made millionaires, owners and investors of many prominent businesses.

They expanded the site and eventually the summer camp became a summer retreat, not only for the Hatches and Odlums, but for numerous friends and family. The Retreat and its owners hosted many famous people from Hollywood movie stars to government leaders and business heads. Guests included those with local ties as well as business associates, socialites, and other elites the Hatches and the Odlums knew through their ties to New York City and Hollywood.

In the 1950s, the camp was donated to the Roman Catholic Diocese by the Hatch family. It was originally offered to the Church of Jesus Christ of Latter-day Saints and then Utah State University, but neither of them were interested in the property. It was renamed St. Ann's retreat by the Church, and it was used as a vacation spot for nuns from Sisters of the Holy Cross and the Benedictines in Salt Lake City. In the 1980s, it became a youth summer camp for the Boys' Club of Weber and Salt Lake Central City Community Center. It was sold for private ownership in the 1993. Hatch's Camp was added to the National Register of Historic Places on December 27, 2006.

== Location ==
The camp is located 8.3 miles up Logan Canyon, Cache County, Utah, 10 miles from the city of Logan. The land is on the grounds of Cache National Forest.

== Amenities ==
The vacation compound includes 21 buildings and structures, including two main lodges, six smaller cabins, a playhouse, a pool house and generator house, along with a fireplace, fire pit, fountain, bridge and swimming pool. At one time, it also was home to a small theater with an adjoining ticket booth. There was originally a horse stable, but it was demolished. Pine Glenn Cove is one of the largest private camps in Logan Canyon and the only one with a swimming pool.

== Folklore ==
Much folklore surrounds the camp, often citing that the retreat is haunted. While there is no record to support the claims, legend says nuns were sent there after becoming pregnant by monks or priests and would drown their babies in the swimming pool where you couldn't hear them cry. A more specific legend included a nun who drowned her baby to keep it a secret and then committed suicide. Children's voices and an apparition of a woman dressed in black have reportedly been observed. Other subjects of legend include satanic worship and hell-hounds.

"Legend-tripping", which involves traveling to a supernatural location in order to determine whether the stories are true, has caused many young people to enter the camp at night. On October 10, 1997, a group of 8 teenagers illegally entered the camp and were surprised by three armed watchmen. The watchmen herded them into the lodge, handcuffed them, and tied their necks together with ropes. The teenagers were released when police arrived. Later that night, however, a larger group of 30 teenagers, unaware of what had happened earlier, trespassed into the camp and were greeted by the same watchmen. They were all forced into the empty swimming pool, had their necks bound by ropes and their hands zip tied. The men told them that if they moved and tightened the ropes, an explosive would trigger and they would be killed. Again, police came and released the teenagers. In both instances, the men called the sheriffs themselves. The police regarded the men as local heroes, which caused a large amount of backlash and initiated a debate about trespassing, the role of law enforcement, and moral values. Eventually, the men were charged with six counts of aggravated assault. The trespassing charges against the teens were dropped, because since the land was technically owned by the Forest Service, the teens were not trespassing.

A collection of folkloric stories and first-hand accounts are available at L. Tom Perry Special Collections Library at the Harold B. Lee Library at Brigham Young University. Folklore accounts and materials are also available through the Fife Folklore Archives at Utah State University.

== Ownership ==
The land is owned by the Forest Service who rents the camp to private owner Matt Nielsen. The retreat is not open to the public. Nielsen has been working to restore the camp so that it can be opened up to the public in the future. An opening date is undetermined. Due to the folklore surrounding the camp, vandalizing and trespassing have been problems and Nielsen had security cameras installed in order to prevent individuals from further damaging the work-in-progress property. There is a Facebook page with pictures of trespassers asking if anyone can identify them.

== Media ==
St. Ann's Retreat was featured as episode nine of season twelve of Travel Channel's Ghost Adventures hosted by Zak Bagans.

== National Register of Historic Places ==
The 2006 National Register of Historic Places listing included 11 contributing buildings and six other contributing structures.

== See also ==
- National Register of Historic Places listings in Utah
