= Hortense Odlum =

American businesswoman (1881–1970)

Hortense McQuarrie Odlum (July 17, 1892 – January 12, 1970) was the first woman president of Bonwit Teller Department Store in New York City and the first wife of financier Floyd Odlum.

== Biography ==
Hortense McQuarrie was born on July 17, 1892, in St. George, Utah, to Hector Allen McQuarrie (1862–1926) and Ella Carr Gardner McQuarrie (1866–1943). She married Floyd Odlum on September 15, 1915, in Philadelphia, Pennsylvania, while he was a law clerk. They moved to New York City when he accepted a position with a New York law firm in 1916. Mr. Odlum became president of Atlas Corporation, which took over Bonwit Teller in 1934. Mr. Odlum appointed his wife as president. She always maintained:

"I was forced to take the job."

The store was confronted with enormous financial problems bordering on bankruptcy. However, within her first two years, the volume of business doubled, and during the third it tripled. She made major rearrangements of boutiques and salons, introduced a bright, cheerful decor and focused on customer relations. She once said:

"I worked like a Trojan. But I never intended to stay. I'm out now and the whole thing leaves me cold."

Divorced from Odlum in 1935, she next married Dr. Porfirio Dominici (1899–1987) in 1935, but that marriage was annulled in 1938.

After six years as Bonwit's president she retired in 1940, but served as chairman from 1940 to 1944. She said "dollars and cents will never mean much to me except as evidence of customer approval." She also stressed in her words: "high class, but not high hat." When asked about her business experience: "I got mine in the hardest of schools. For nearly 12 years, I ...was just a customer." After retirement she proclaimed, "I want to go back and be what I really am – just the typical customer who has found a store she loves to shop in."

Her sister's son was the actor Robert Hudson Walker. She offered to finance his studies at the prestigious American Academy of Dramatic Arts in New York City. He stayed in her home during his first year there.

== Publications ==
Her book about her life experiences and in particular becoming president of Bonwit Teller, A Woman's Place, was published in 1939.
