= Floyd Odlum =

American lawyer (1892–1976)

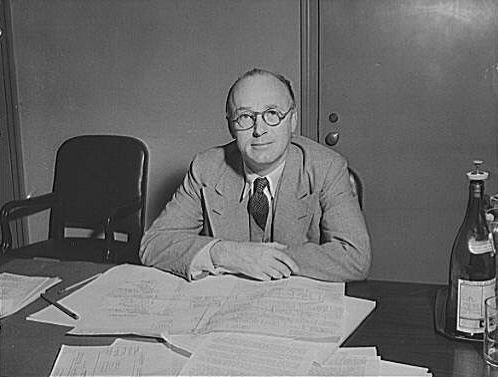
- Odlum c. mid 1940s
- Born: Floyd Bostwick Odlum; March 30, 1892; Union City, Michigan, U.S.
- Died: June 17, 1976 (aged 84); Indio, California, U.S.
- Occupations: Lawyer, industrialist
- Employer(s): Electric Bond and Share Company, Atlas Utilities Company
- Spouses: Hortense McQuarrie (m. 1915; div. 1935); Jackie Cochran (m. 1936)

Floyd Bostwick Odlum (March 30, 1892 – June 17, 1976) was an American lawyer and industrialist. He has been described as "possibly the only man in the United States who made a great fortune out of the Depression."

== Life and career ==
Odlum attended the University of Colorado Boulder, where he was a member of the Colorado Alpha chapter of Sigma Phi Epsilon fraternity, and graduated with a law degree in 1914. Following graduation, he moved to Salt Lake City, Utah, where he worked as an attorney for Utah Power & Light. After struggling as a corporate attorney in Salt Lake City, Odlum received an offer of a job at a New York firm, and in 1921 became vice-president of his primary client, Electric Bond and Share Company. In 1923, Odlum, a friend, and their wives pooled a total of $39,600 and formed the United States Company to speculate in purchases of utilities and general securities. Within two years, the company's net assets had increased 17 fold to nearly $700,000. In 1928, Odlum incorporated Atlas Utilities Company to take over the common stock of his other company.

During the summer of 1929, Odlum was one of the few industrial moguls to believe that the boom on Wall Street could not continue much longer, and he sold one half of Atlas's holdings, as well as $9 million in new securities to investors. He had $14 million in cash and short term notes when the stock market crashed. During the next few years, Atlas Utilities bought up stock in less fortunate investment companies at Depression-reduced prices. After Franklin D. Roosevelt was inaugurated President of the United States, Odlum shifted gears, selling off utilities before stronger regulation set in, and switching to large-scale financing. By 1933, Odlum was one of the 10 wealthiest men in the United States. Besides Atlas Corporation, he had a major stake in RKO Studios, Convair, Northeast Airlines, and Bonwit Teller, among other businesses, and was associated in the aviation business with financier George Newell Armsby. Odlum's association with Armsby provided a link to Armsby and John Cheever Cowdin's enterprise Transcontinental Air Transport, Inc. In 1942, the University of Colorado recognized him with its George Norlin Award.

In 1948, Odlum sold RKO to Howard Hughes. In May 1951 he was appointed to the executive committee of the California branch of the Committee on the Present Danger. Odlum was an investor in the 1954 production of the Broadway show The Pajama Game in which actress Shirley MacLaine was discovered by Paramount Pictures producer Hal Wallis and convinced Goldman Sachs's head Sidney Weinberg to invest as well.

Odlum was first married, in 1915, to Hortense McQuarrie, first female department store head (at Bonwit Teller); they were divorced in 1935. His second wife, whom he married in 1936, was aviator Jackie Cochran. Odlum and Cochran were close friends of Amelia Earhart and her husband George P. Putnam, and the Odlums were financial backers of Earhart's flying activities. They developed the Cochran-Odlum (C-O) Ranch in Indio, California where they lived after the 1950s.

Odlum along with business associate L. Boyd Hatch also purchased and developed Pine Glenn Cove, also known as St. Ann's Retreat or Hatch's Camp, a mountainous retreat in Logan Canyon, Utah. In 2006, Pine Glenn Cove was placed on the National Register of Historic Places.

Odlum died in 1976 at the age of 84. His wife Jackie Cochran died four years later on August 9, 1980.
