= Hughes XF-11 =

Prototype 1940s reconnaissance aircraft

XF-11
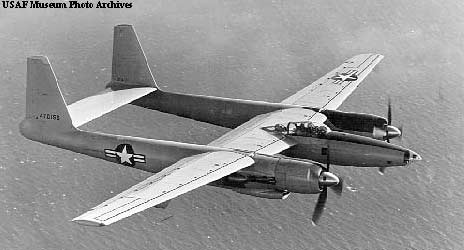
- The second Hughes XF-11 during a 1947 test flight

General information
- Type: Aerial reconnaissance
- Manufacturer: Hughes Aircraft
- Designer: Stanley Bell, Howard Hughes, Ed West
- Status: Canceled
- Primary user: United States Army Air Forces
- Number built: 2

History
- First flight: 7 July 1946
- Developed from: Hughes D-2

The Hughes XF-11 (redesignated XR-11 in 1948) was a prototype military reconnaissance aircraft designed and flown by Howard Hughes and built by Hughes Aircraft Company for the United States Army Air Forces (USAAF). Although 100 F-11s were ordered in 1943, (Note: Under the 1924 United States Army Air Service aircraft designation system, prototypes of an anticipated production aircraft were assigned an "X" prefix; however, no F-11 production aircraft were built.) the program was delayed beyond the end of World War II, rendering the aircraft surplus to USAAF requirements; the production contract was canceled and only two prototypes were completed. During the first XF-11 flight in 1946, piloted by Hughes, the aircraft crashed in Beverly Hills, California, and was destroyed, critically injuring him. The second prototype first flew in 1947, but was used only briefly for testing before being scrapped in 1949. The program was controversial from the beginning, leading the United States Senate to investigate the XF-11 and the Hughes H-4 Hercules flying boat in 1946–1947.

== Development ==
The F-11 was intended to meet the same USAAF operational objective as the Republic XF-12 Rainbow: a fast, long-range, high-altitude photographic reconnaissance aircraft. A highly modified version of the earlier private-venture Hughes D-2, it resembled the Lockheed P-38 Lightning, but was much larger and heavier. Hughes Aircraft Company founder Howard Hughes had first promoted the D-2 as a "pursuit type airplane", (i.e. a fighter aircraft), but it lacked both the maneuverability of a fighter and the load-carrying capacity of bomber, and could not accommodate required military equipment; additionally, the USAAF Air Materiel Command (AMC) objected to its wooden Duramold construction due to a perceived lack of durability under fire. Hughes was determined to win a military contract but soon realized that the USAAF was highly unlikely to accept the D-2, so he began petitioning USAAF leaders to issue a contract to redesign it for photographic reconnaissance, and spent several million dollars hiring additional staff and opening a new engineering office for the effort.

Hughes campaigned the USAAF in Washington, enlisting his father's friend, Secretary of Commerce Jesse Holman Jones, who met with President Franklin Roosevelt in June 1942 to discuss the project. The outcome of the visit was inconclusive. However, around this time, USAAF leaders were debating the need for a dedicated, purpose-designed reconnaissance aircraft with greater capabilities than existing converted fighters and bombers. The need was particularly acute in the Pacific theater because the loss of air bases in China placed many strategic targets in Japan beyond the range of almost all existing Allied aircraft; the Boeing B-29 Superfortress would be able to reach these areas, but some USAAF leaders objected to diverting this valuable strategic bomber to the long-range reconnaissance role. In January 1943, the USAAF launched a program to procure a dedicated reconnaissance aircraft with superior range, speed, and altitude capabilities. Preliminary specifications were issued in April of that year. Boeing proposed a heavily modified B-29, while the Lockheed Aircraft Company proposed a version of its experimental XP-58 fighter. The Hughes Aircraft and Republic Aviation proposals would become the XF-11 and XF-12 respectively.

Howard Hughes found out that Colonel Elliott Roosevelt, the president's son and a USAAF reconnaissance commander, would visit Hughes Aircraft in August 1943 in the process of surveying reconnaissance aircraft proposals. When Roosevelt and his team arrived on August 11, Hughes' public relations agent John Meyer showed them the D-2 prototype, took them on a tour of several Hollywood film studios, and introduced Roosevelt to actress Faye Emerson, whom Roosevelt would later marry. Meyer encouraged Roosevelt and his entourage to stay in a private home at his expense, and when Roosevelt demurred, Meyer paid their hotel bill. After Roosevelt left, Meyer invited him to parties he was hosting in New York City and took him to Manhattan nightclubs, where Meyer paid. On August 20, Roosevelt submitted a report to General Henry "Hap" Arnold, chief of the U.S. Army Air Forces, recommending the Hughes proposal. Arnold ordered 100 F-11s for delivery beginning in 1944, overriding the strenuous objections of AMC, which held that Hughes Aircraft lacked the industrial capacity and track record to deliver on its founder's promises, and recommended that Arnold should instead approve the reconnaissance version of the XP-58. Arnold later regretted the decision, saying that he made it "much against my better judgment and the advice of my staff" after consultations with the White House.

A preliminary $43 million contract issued on 11 October 1943 was contested by Hughes, who sought $3.6 to $3.9 million in compensation for the development of the D-2, and objected to AMC's requirements for all-metal construction, self-sealing fuel tanks, and various other major design changes that undermined his contention that the F-11 was directly derived from the D-2. The USAAF strongly objected, arguing that the D-2 project was initiated without USAAF input, and that Hughes had continuously withheld information about the aircraft. In another complication, the War Production Board (WPB) wanted Hughes to build a new assembly plant near Hughes Tool Company headquarters in Houston, where labor costs were lower than in southern California. The WPB eventually relented and allowed Hughes Aircraft to use its existing Culver City, California, assembly plant, and the USAAF made some small design concessions; however, Hughes failed to secure full reimbursement and ultimately agreed to most of the design changes, notably including the elimination of Duramold. The protracted negotiations consumed the better part of ten months, and the final contract was awarded on 1 August 1944. Hughes was awarded $1.6 million in reimbursement.

The program was plagued by managerial and logistical delays. By early 1944, Hughes was suffering from mental strain from the demands of managing both the F-11 and Hughes H-4 Hercules projects, and had become withdrawn. Warned that the USAAF was considering canceling the F-11 due to a lack of progress, Hughes hired Charles Perrell, former vice president of production at Consolidated Vultee, to manage the program, promising him full and unconditional control. Perrell found Hughes Aircraft rife with inefficiency and suffering from a "complete lack of experience in the design and construction of airplanes in general." His efforts to reorganize were hindered by resistance from senior Hughes Aircraft engineers, who were accustomed to a freewheeling work atmosphere, and from Hughes Tool executives who feared that Perrell would usurp their authority over the aircraft company. 21 engineers, including chief engineer Ed West, resigned in a May 1944 dispute over their offices being moved from Brea, California, to the Culver City plant. The prototype's wings–subcontracted to Fleetwings–were delivered six months behind schedule in April 1945. With the end of the European war in May 1945, the order for 100 F-11s was reduced to just three, a static test model and the two prototypes, and the USAAF de-prioritized the project. The engines were delivered seven months behind schedule in September 1945. By this time, Perrell had been successful in reforming the program, but there was no longer any impetus to deliver 98 production aircraft, and Hughes returned from self-imposed exile and began to interfere despite his earlier promises not to do so. Relations between the two men deteriorated and Hughes had Perrell fired in December.

== Design ==
The XF-11 emerged as a tricycle landing gear, twin-engine, twin-boom all-metal monoplane with a pressurized central crew nacelle and a much larger wingspan and higher aspect ratio than the P-38 or the D-2. The aircraft was of conventional aluminum alloy construction with flush riveted skin. The wings were equipped with single-slotted Fowler flaps; roll control was provided by mid-chord spoilers at high speeds and by ailerons near the wingtips at low speeds. To provide added fuel capacity and range, hardpoints were mounted under the wings for 700-US-gallon (2,600 L; 580 imp gal) auxiliary drop tanks, and design drawings also indicated provisions for mounting 600-US-gallon (2,300 L; 500 imp gal) auxiliary tip tanks. However, there is no evidence that auxiliary fuel tanks were ever fitted to the prototypes during flight tests.

The aircraft was designed to be flown by a crew of two in laterally staggered tandem seating, with the pilot sitting forward and a navigator/photographer sitting behind and to the right; the navigator/photographer could crawl into the nose to service the cameras in flight. A dedicated photographic systems technician could also sit in the lower nose compartment to service the cameras. The nose compartment housed a Fairchild K-17 camera in the transparent nose cone together with two additional cameras aimed outwards through windows. Two additional downward-facing Fairchild K-22 cameras were fitted in the left tail boom behind small retractable doors. Unlike the competing Republic XF-12, the XF-11 had no provisions for developing films in flight, for mounting trimetrogon cameras (used for studying topography), nor for dropping flash bombs for nighttime missions. Fitting trimetrogon cameras to the production F-11 was considered; however, due to the lack of provisions for flash bombs, the USAAF intended to restrict the F-11 to daytime missions only.

The USAAF wanted the aircraft to be fitted with an ice protection system, but Hughes engineers were unable to design a satisfactory system before the test program; as a compromise, the USAAF allowed ice protection to be omitted from the prototypes, and accordingly agreed that test flights would take place only under visual flight rules, thus avoiding instrument meteorological conditions where atmospheric icing is more likely.

The XF-11 was powered by a pair of Pratt & Whitney R-4360-31 28-cylinder radial engines rated at 3,000 horsepower (2,200 kW) of takeoff power at sea level and 2,500 horsepower (1,900 kW) at 33,000 feet (10,000 m). Contra-rotating propellers were originally a contract design requirement for both the XF-11 and XF-12, and Hughes Aircraft and Republic Aircraft were given a choice between competing designs from Hamilton Standard and Aeroproducts. (Note: Republic obtained a waiver from the contra-rotating propeller requirement on the grounds that both types were undergoing serious developmental problems likely to delay deliveries, and preliminary testing had demonstrated disappointing performance. Historian Mike Machat notes that some sources erroneously attribute the XF-12 propeller waiver to the XF-11 crash, but the USAAF granted the waiver in July 1945, about a year before the crash.) The first XF-11 prototype was equipped with a pair of dual four-bladed, variable-pitch, contra-rotating Hamilton Standard propellers; these proved troublesome in testing, having a tendency to suddenly and inexplicably reverse pitch. The second prototype was equipped with conventional four-bladed, variable-pitch Curtiss Electric propellers identical to those fitted to the P-61 Black Widow.

== Operational history ==
=== First prototype and Beverly Hills crash ===
1946 newsreel

The first prototype, tail number 44-70155, was conditionally accepted by the USAAF on 5 April 1946 although its electrical and hydraulic systems were incomplete. On 24 April, the aircraft was briefly flown at an altitude of 20 ft (6.1 m) over the runway, but the company decided to wait for replacement propellers before initiating formal test flights. During its official maiden flight on 7 July 1946 from the Hughes Aircraft factory airfield at Culver City, piloted by Howard Hughes personally, the aircraft crashed and was destroyed, and Hughes was severely injured.

Hughes did not follow the agreed testing protocol, which called for a 45-minute flight with the landing gear extended. He ordered the loading of 1,200 US gal (4,500 L) of fuel rather than 600 US gal (2,300 L) as prescribed by the USAAF, hinting at a surreptitious plan to prolong the flight. Hydraulic fluid for the right-hand propeller had to be refilled repeatedly after preflight engine tests, but since all systems seemed to be working properly and no leak was observed, Hughes decided to proceed. On takeoff, Hughes retracted the landing gear, violating USAAF protocol. Cockpit lights indicated that the gear did not retract properly, apparently distracting Hughes, who repeatedly lowered and raised the gear and requested that another aircraft be flown alongside to observe its operation. Glenn Odekirk—who had replaced Charles Perrell as Hughes Aircraft general manager—and company test pilot Gene Blandford flew an A-20 Havoc next to the XF-11 as Hughes again lowered and raised the gear. The pair were unable to communicate directly with Hughes due to confusion about radio frequencies, but they had observed nothing amiss, so they returned to the airfield. Hughes continued flying the XF-11 in broad circles above Culver City.

An hour and fifteen minutes into the flight, after onboard recording cameras had run out of film, a leak caused the right-hand propeller controls to lose their effectiveness and the rear propeller subsequently reversed its pitch, disrupting that engine's thrust and causing the aircraft to yaw hard to the right and begin descending steeply. Hughes was about 2 miles (3.2 km) from the factory airfield at an altitude of about 5,000 ft (1,500 m) at the time, but he decided to fly away and troubleshoot the problem rather than returning to land, later saying he believed that some unseen part of the right-hand wing or landing gear had broken open and was causing severe aerodynamic drag. Hughes lowered and raised the landing gear again, made various adjustments to the flight control surfaces, and made several power adjustments to both engines, ultimately leaving the right-hand engine at full power and reducing power to the left-hand engine. The aircraft continued to descend and Hughes considered bailing out, but realized he was too low to do so safely. He initiated a forced landing on the golf course of the Los Angeles Country Club, but about 300 yards (270 m) short of the course, the aircraft suddenly lost altitude and clipped three houses in Beverly Hills. The third house and the aircraft were both destroyed by impact and fire; Hughes was nearly killed.

USAAF investigators concluded that, "It appeared that loss of hydraulic fluid caused failure of the pitch change mechanism of right rear propeller. Mr. Hughes maintained full power of right engine and reduced that of left engine instead of trying to fly with right propeller windmilling without power. It was Wright Field's understanding that the crash was attributed to pilot error," yet Hughes successfully brought suit against Hamilton Standard for the malfunctioning contra-rotating blades in the right propeller. The crash was dramatized in the 2004 biographical film The Aviator.

=== Second prototype ===
The second prototype, 44-70156, was fitted with conventional single four-bladed propellers, and was flown by Hughes on 5 April 1947. Initially, the USAAF had insisted that Hughes not be allowed to fly the aircraft, but after a personal appeal to Generals Ira Eaker and Carl Spaatz, he was allowed to do so against posting of $5 million in security. (Note: Quoting Eaker's Nov. 1947 testimony to the Senate.) The USAAF demanded that the aircraft be trucked from Culver City to Muroc Dry Lake for the flight, fearing the repercussions of another crash in a populated area.

This test flight was uneventful, and the aircraft proved stable and controllable at high speed. It lacked low-speed stability, however, as the ailerons were ineffective at low altitudes. When the USAAF evaluated it against the Republic XF-12, testing revealed the XF-11 was harder to fly and maintain, and it was projected to be twice as expensive to build. Numerous XF-11 onboard systems were unreliable, and several test flights were canceled due to engine, turbocharger, or electrical problems. The XF-11 nose compartment was cramped, hindering access to equipment; a USAAF report noted that servicing the nose cameras in flight was "virtually impossible" due to the lack of working space. In contrast, the XF-12 camera equipment was readily accessible in its spacious rear fuselage, which also housed an onboard darkroom for developing film during missions.

The United States Air Force (USAF) was created as a separate service in September 1947, and the XF-11 was redesignated as the XR-11 in July 1948 (the XF-12 was similarly redesignated as the XR-12). The surviving XR-11 prototype arrived at Eglin Field, Florida, in December 1948 from Wright Field, Ohio, to undergo operational suitability testing. The airframe was transferred to Sheppard Air Force Base, Texas, and was authorized to be scrapped on 26 July 1949, but was used as a ground maintenance trainer by the 3750th Technical Training Wing until November 1949 when it was dropped from the USAF inventory and scrapped on site. The XF-11 program cost the federal government $14,155,235 (equivalent to $204,101,190 in 2025), and Hughes absorbed at least a quarter of this amount in sunk costs from the D-2.

An R-12 production order was issued, but the Republic program was also ultimately canceled in favor of the RB-50 Superfortress.

== Senate investigation ==
From 1946 to 1947, the U.S. Senate Special Senate Committee Investigating the National Defense Program—popularly known as the Truman Committee—investigated the F-11 and H-4 programs, leading to the highly publicized Hughes-Roosevelt hearings in August 1947. Maine senator and committee chairman Ralph Owen Brewster sought to discredit the rival Roosevelt family and Hughes; in addition to securing the controversial XF-11 and H-4 contracts, Hughes had also backed recent legislation that favored Trans World Airlines, which Hughes then controlled, over Pan American World Airways, which Brewster backed. The committee revealed that John Meyer had spent $169,661 (equivalent to $3,156,673 in 2025) entertaining Elliott Roosevelt and other USAAF officers overseeing reconnaissance aircraft procurement. On 4 August 1947, Meyer and Roosevelt testified before the committee and denied any wrongdoing or improper influence. Howard Hughes subsequently testified before the committee and is generally thought to have successfully deflected criticism of his company's alleged mismanagement of the F-11 and H-4 contracts.

== Specifications (XF-11) ==
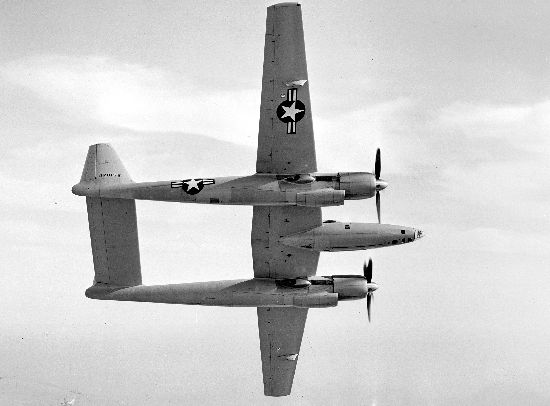
The second XF-11 displaying hardpoints for drop tanks under the wings, and camera windows in the nose cone and right tail boom; additional cameras were housed in the left tail boom behind retractable doors.

Data from Jane's all the World's Aircraft 1947

General characteristics

- Crew: 2, pilot and navigator/photographer
- Length: 65 ft 3 in (19.9 m)
- Wingspan: 101 ft 5 in (30.9 m)
- Wing area: 983 sq ft (91.3 m^{2})
- Aspect ratio: 10.46
- Airfoil: NACA 66(215)-216
- Empty weight: 37,100 lb (16,828 kg)
- Gross weight: 47,500 lb (21,546 kg) (4,000 mi (3,500 nmi; 6,400 km) range)
- Max takeoff weight: 58,315 lb (26,451 kg) (5,000 mi (4,300 nmi; 8,000 km) range)
- Powerplant: 2 × Pratt & Whitney R-4360-31 Wasp Major 28-cyl. air-cooled radial piston engines, 3,000 hp (2,200 kW) each
- Propellers: 8-bladed Hamilton Standard Hydromatic contra-rotating propellers

Performance

- Maximum speed: 450 mph (720 km/h, 390 kn) at 33,000 ft (10,000 m); 295 mph (256 kn; 475 km/h) at sea level
- Service ceiling: 42,000 ft (13,000 m)
- Rate of climb: 1,000 ft/min (5.1 m/s)
- Time to altitude: 33,000 ft (10,000 m) in 17.4 minutes
- Wing loading: 59.3 lb/sq ft (290 kg/m^{2}) (5,000 mi (4,300 nmi; 8,000 km) range)

== See also ==
Related development

- Hughes D-2

Aircraft of comparable role, configuration, and era

- Boeing RB-50 Superfortress
- Northrop F-15 Reporter
- Lockheed P-38 Lightning (F-5)
- Republic XF-12 Rainbow

Related lists

- List of military aircraft of the United States

== Bibliography ==
- Bartlett, Donald L.; Steele, James B. (2004) [1979]. Howard Hughes: His Life and Madness. New York City: W.W. Norton. ISBN 0-393-32602-0. First published in 1979 as Empire: The Life, Legend, and Madness of Howard Hughes
- Bridgman, Leonard, ed. (1947). Jane's all the World's Aircraft 1947. London: Sampson Low, Marston & Co. OCLC 878735425.
- Buttler, Tony (2024). American Experimental Fighters of WWII: The Pursuit of Excellence. Crécy Publishing. ISBN 978-1-80035-310-7.
- Dietrich, Noah; Thomas, Bob (1972). Howard, The Amazing Mr. Hughes. Greenwich: Fawcett Publications, Inc. ISBN 978-0-340-16493-8.
- Francillon, René J. (1990). McDonnell Douglas Aircraft since 1920. Vol. II. Annapolis, Maryland: Naval Institute Press. ISBN 1-55750-550-0.
- Hansen, Chris (2012). Enfant Terrible: The Times and Schemes of General Elliott Roosevelt. Tucson, Arizona: Able Baker Press. ISBN 978-0-61566-892-5.
- Machat, Mike (2011). World's Fastest Four-Engine Piston-Powered Aircraft: Republic XR-12 Rainbow. North Branch, Minnesota: Specialty Press. ISBN 978-158007-163-5.
- Parker, Dana T. (2013). Building Victory: Aircraft Manufacturing in the Los Angeles Area in World War II. Cypress, California: D. T. Parker. ISBN 978-0-9897906-0-4.
- Winchester, Jim (2005). Hughes XF-11. Concept Aircraft: Prototypes, X-Planes and Experimental Aircraft. Kent: Grange Books. ISBN 978-1-84013-809-2..
