= Hughes D-2 =

Prototype fighter aircraft

D-2

General information
- Type: Fighter aircraft, bomber
- Manufacturer: Hughes Aircraft
- Designer: Howard Hughes
- Primary user: United States Army Air Forces (intended)
- Number built: 1 prototype

History
- Introduction date: Canceled
- First flight: 20 June 1943
- Retired: 1944
- Variants: Hughes XF-11

The Hughes D-2 was an American fighter and bomber project begun by Howard Hughes as a private venture. It never proceeded past the flight testing phase but was the predecessor of the Hughes XF-11. The sole D-2 was completed in 1942–1943.

== Design and development ==
In 1937, Howard Hughes began the design of an advanced twin-engine, twin-boom aircraft. The D-2's early gestation is historically obscure because Hughes Aircraft and its corporate successors have never released archives regarding the D-2; however, Howard Hughes had recently set a global circumnavigation speed record in a Lockheed 14. Aircraft historian René Francillon speculates that Hughes probably initiated the project for another circumnavigation record attempt, but the outbreak of World War II closed much of the world's airspace and made it difficult to buy aircraft parts without government approval, so he decided to sell the aircraft to the U.S. military instead. The first documentary evidence of the project is a December 1939 letter from Hughes to the United States Army Air Corps (USAAC) proposing procurement of the D-2 and describing it as a "pursuit type airplane". The design was somewhat similar to the Lockheed P-38 Lightning that won the 1939 USAAC interceptor aircraft design competition. Hughes later testified to the U.S. Senate that Lockheed had stolen his design, although this has been refuted by many. (Note: Francillon notes that the D-2 and P-38 both resemble the influential Fokker G.I, which was first exhibited in 1936, before either aircraft was designed.) Rather than abandon the project, as he later recounted in the 1947 Senate investigation, he "decided to design and build from the ground up, and with my own money, an entirely new airplane which would be so sensational in its performance that the Army would have to accept it."

Most of the airframe of the "DX-2" was made of Duramold plywood, a plastic-bonded plywood molded under heat and high pressure. This material was advantageous from an aerodynamic and a metals-shortage standpoint, but was difficult to work, and rejected as insufficiently robust by the USAAC. Initially, the aircraft was to have been equipped with a tail wheel but the landing gear was later changed to a tricycle configuration with the main undercarriage units retracting rearwards into the twin booms and the nosewheel retracting rearwards and rotating 90 degrees to lie flat in the small central fuselage. The powerplants were to have been a pair of experimental Wright R-2160 Tornado 42-cylinder, liquid-cooled radial engines. The D-2 was built in secret at the Hughes Culver City, California factory with longtime associate, Glenn Odekirk, providing engineering inputs. The secrecy further alienated USAAC officers, especially when Hughes denied Materiel Command access to the plant. The USAAC had requested information about the project's progress, but did not enter into a formal contract until 1944. Final assembly and flight testing occurred at the Hughes Harper Dry Lake facility in the Mojave Desert. The finished D-2 looked like a scaled-up P-38 Lightning but, on paper, promised better performance; the USAAC repeatedly compared it to the Lockheed XP-58 Chain Lightning.

Difficulties encountered in obtaining the Wright Tornado engines led to the substitution of proven Pratt & Whitney R-2800s.

Numerous designations were given to the project, including D-2, DX-2, DX-2A, D-3, D-5, XA-37, and XP-73. The names reflected difficulties in development, shifting mission emphasis, and the USAAC's uncertainty over how to use the aircraft, which lacked both the maneuverability of a fighter and the payload capacity of a bomber or attack aircraft. In June 1942, a USAAF memorandum stated:

"Hughes Model DX-2A. Has been submitted as a convoy protector, convoy destroyer, pursuit airplane, fighter, and light bombardment type. Its longest life has been as a convoy protector, but the latest specification which will be used in the negotiations calls it a fighter. If the present airplane is completed as a military weapon, it will have armament substantially as on the XP-58. Its sole claim to being a bomber is the fact that it is equipped with bomb bay doors. Since it is to be purchased in its commercial form ... it is considered advisable to call it the XP-73 for the sake of administering the contract."

The XP-73 was thus a temporary designation applied to the D-2 after the Material Command at Wright Field obtained approval to purchase "one Hughes DX-2 airplane in present commercial form as a prototype ..." Within three days, the D-2 had been redesignated as the XA-37 for purposes of administering a contract. However, Materiel Command engineers vehemently opposed the aircraft, partly because it was built of wood instead of aluminum, and in part because they believed Hughes had not the managerial and industrial capability to actually produce the aircraft. Neither of the above USAAF designations thus applied to any actual airplane; in the end, only two XF-11 prototypes and a mock-up were delivered.

Because of Hughes's high political and public profile, the program was highly controversial. In July 1942, President Franklin D. Roosevelt's requested information and progress from USAAF chief General Henry "Hap" Arnold about the aircraft. Again in August–September 1943, the president and White House staff discussed Hughes's progress with Arnold, who then gave the order to purchase 100 F-11 derivatives.

== Operational history ==
=== Testing ===
After the D-2 was readied for flight in 1942, Hughes himself took over the flight test program. However, after only a few brief hops, it was clear that high control forces were a problem. When full flight tests were finally conducted in spring 1943, modifications still had not been made to correct this problem. Hughes reluctantly concluded that the D-2 needed major modifications, including a complete redesign of the wings and a change in airfoil section. The wing center section, which was continuous through the fuselage nacelle, was to be revised to increase the size of the proposed bomb bay. Following these changes, the aircraft was to be assigned the company designation D-5. After only a few test flights, the sole aircraft was abandoned and further development of the subsequent F-11 proceeded at Culver City.

=== Aftermath ===
In August 1943, Colonel Elliott Roosevelt, the President's son and then commander of the Northwest African Photographic Reconnaissance Wing, led a distinguished team tasked with evaluation of several American reconnaissance aircraft projects. He was lavishly entertained by Howard Hughes and his staff, and on 20 August he submitted to Arnold a glowing recommendation of the D-2 with photographic reconnaissance modifications. Roosevelt stated that delivery of a small number of these planes would win the war within six months. It was this recommendation, shared by Elliott with his father the president, that caused General Arnold to verbally order the aircraft, overriding repeated objections from Materiel Command. On 11 October 1943, a letter of intent for 100 F-11s, costing $48,500,000 was signed.

The D-2 prototype, which never flew well, was destroyed in an unexplained fire at Harper Dry Lake on 11 November 1944. The aircraft had become the center of a dispute between the USAAC and Hughes, who demanded that the military pay for its original development costs. The USAAF refused, and then insisted on inspecting the plane. However, after the fire, a 50-50 split of costs was agreed.

In mid-1944, Hughes entered into the contract to develop the high-altitude, high-speed XF-11 derivative. The entire project was examined in great detail by the Senate War Investigating Committee in 1947. This led to the dramatic, highly publicized Hughes-Roosevelt hearings in August and November of that year.

== Variants ==
D-2
Prototype. One completed. Other designations include DX-2, DX-2A, and D-3
D-5
Designation of the sole D-2 after extensive modifications. Aircraft destroyed before modifications were completed.
XP-73
Temporary designation used in contracts.
XA-37
Temporary designation used in contracts.

=== Proposed variants without designations ===
The following production variants of the D-5 were proposed by Hughes:

- Two-seat reconnaissance aircraft.
- Three-seat light bomber.
- Two-seat escort fighter.

== Specifications ==
Data from McDonnell Douglas Aircraft since 1920: Volume II

General characteristics

- Crew: one pilot, crew of two (in bomber version)
- Length: 57 ft 10 in (17.6 m)
- Wingspan: 60 ft 0 in (18.29 m)
- Height: 27 ft 4 in (8.3 m)
- Wing area: 616 sq ft (57.23 m^{2})
- Gross weight: 31,672 lb (14,366 kg)
- Powerplant: 2 × Pratt & Whitney R-2800-49 , 2,000 hp (1,500 kW) each

Performance

- Maximum speed: 433 mph (697 km/h, 376 kn) at 25,000 ft (7,620 m)
- Cruise speed: 274 mph (441 km/h, 238 kn)
- Range: 1,000 mi (1,610 km, 870 nmi)
- Service ceiling: 36,000 ft (10,975 m)
- Rate of climb: 2,620 ft/min (13 m/s)
