= Hughes Aircraft Company =

American aerospace and defense company (1934–1997)

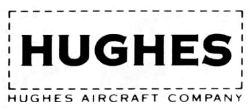
- Hughes Aircraft Company logo, during most of the company's first 50 years
- Industry: Aerospace and defense (Defense and Communications Electronics)
- Founded: February 14, 1934; 92 years ago in Glendale, California, U.S.
- Founder: Howard Hughes
- Defunct: 1997; 29 years ago
- Fate: Sold to Raytheon
- Headquarters: Culver City, El Segundo and Westchester, U.S.
- Key people: Lawrence A. Hyland; Glenn Odekirk
- Revenue: $11B peak, 1986
- Owner: Hughes Tool Company (1934); Howard Hughes Medical Institute (1953); General Motors (1985)
- Number of employees: 84,000 peak, 1985

Hughes Aircraft Company was a major American aerospace and defense contractor founded on February 14, 1934 by Howard Hughes in Glendale, California, as a division of Hughes Tool Company. The company produced the Hughes H-4 Hercules aircraft, the atmospheric entry probe carried by the Galileo spacecraft, and the AIM-4 Falcon guided missile.

Hughes Aircraft was founded to build Hughes' H-1 Racer world speed record aircraft, and later modified other aircraft for his transcontinental and global circumnavigation speed record flights. The company relocated to Culver City, California, in 1940 and began manufacturing aircraft parts as a subcontractor. Hughes attempted to mold it into a major military aircraft manufacturer during World War II. However, its early military projects ended in failure, with millions of dollars in U.S. government funds expended for only a handful of prototypes, resulting in a highly publicized U.S. Senate investigation into alleged mismanagement. The U.S. military consequently hesitated to award new aircraft contracts to Hughes Aircraft, prompting new management in the late 1940s to instead pursue contracts for fire-control systems and guided missiles, which were new technologies. The company soon became a highly profitable industry leader in these fields.

In a 1953 accounting maneuver designed to reduce his income tax liabilities, Howard Hughes donated most of Hughes Aircraft's stock and assets to the Howard Hughes Medical Institute (HHMI), a charity he created himself, and subsequently ceased managing the company directly. Hughes retained a small cadre of engineers under his personal control as the Hughes Tool Company Aircraft Division, which initially operated from the same Culver City complex as Hughes Aircraft, despite being separately owned and managed. This entity subsequently became fully independent from Hughes Aircraft and changed its name to Hughes Helicopters. After Hughes' 1976 death, Hughes Aircraft was acquired by General Motors from HHMI in 1985 and was put under the umbrella of Hughes Electronics (which became DirecTV in 1994), until GM sold its assets to Raytheon in 1997.

== History ==
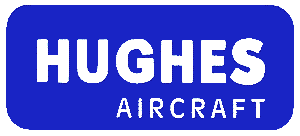
Hughes logo, adopted after the death of its founder

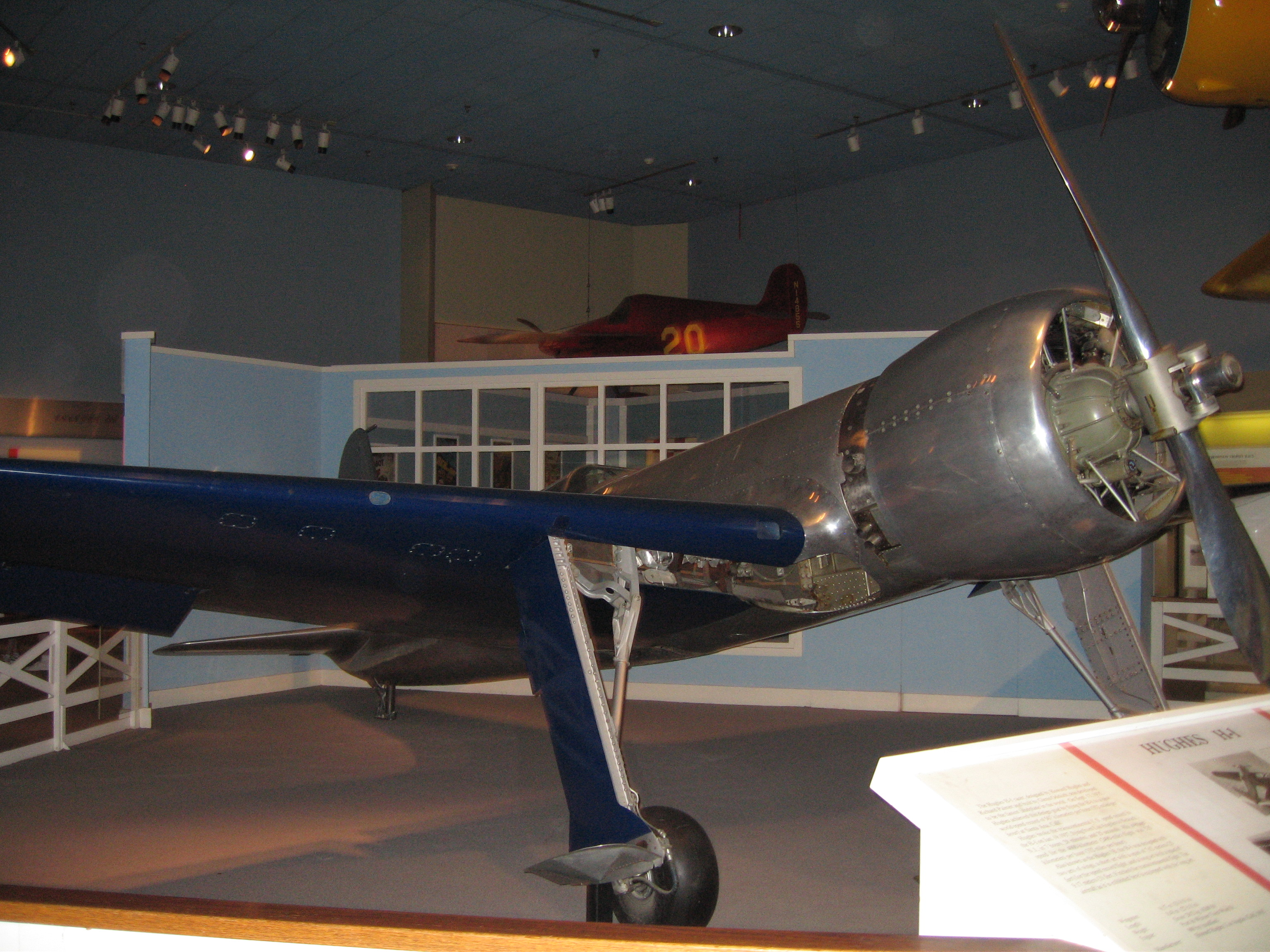
Hughes H-1 Racer

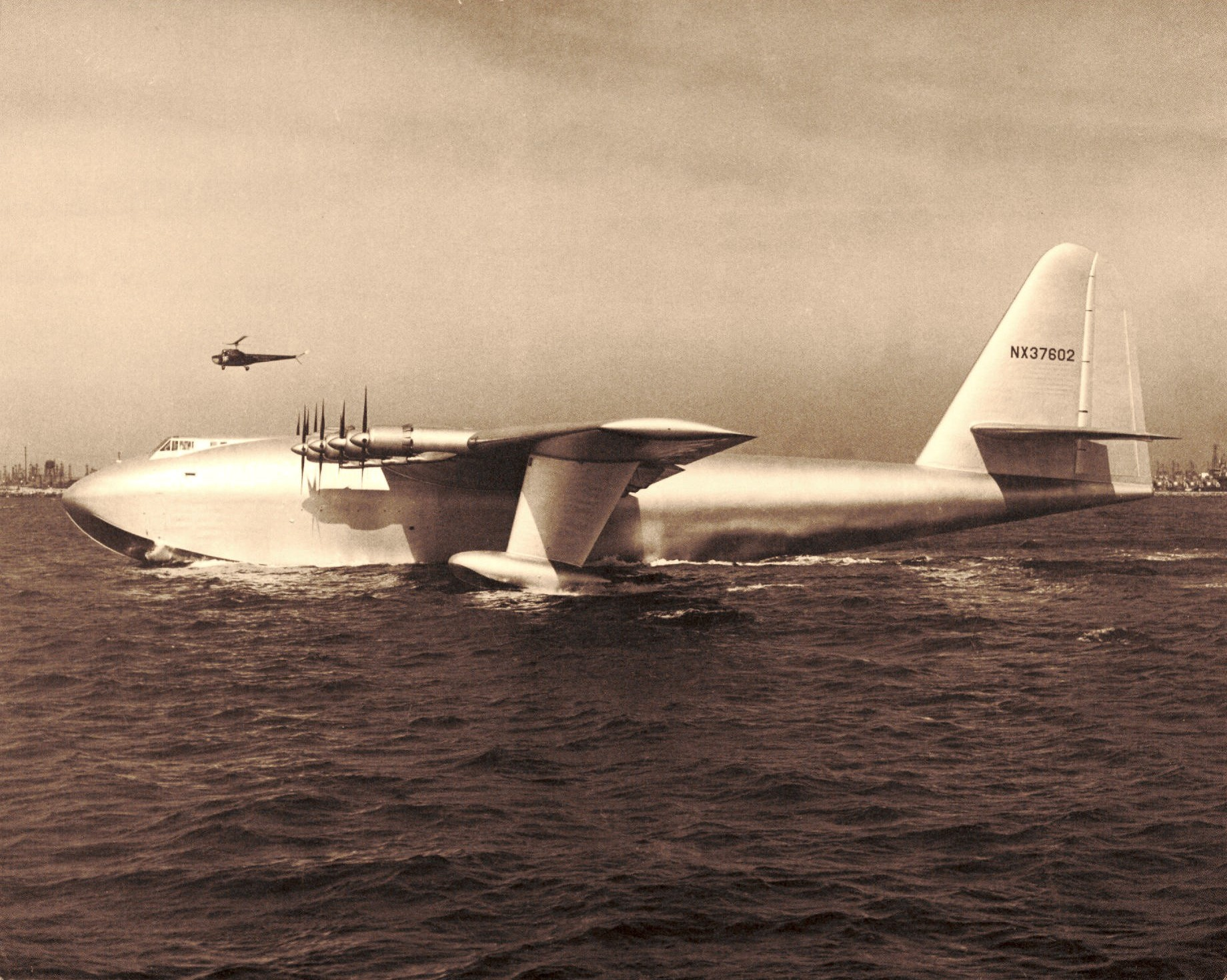
Hughes H-4 Hercules.

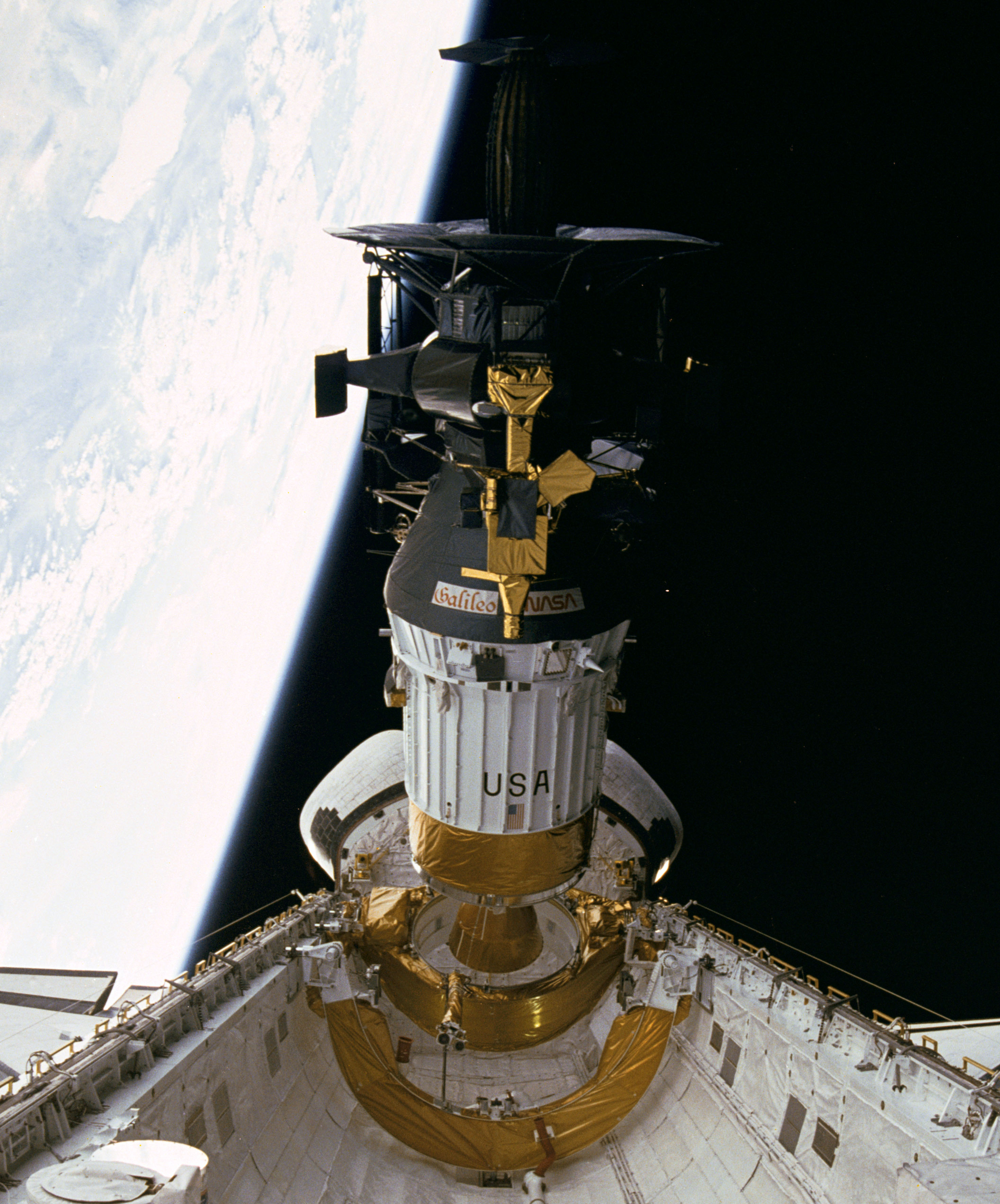
Hughes Galileo probe being deployed.

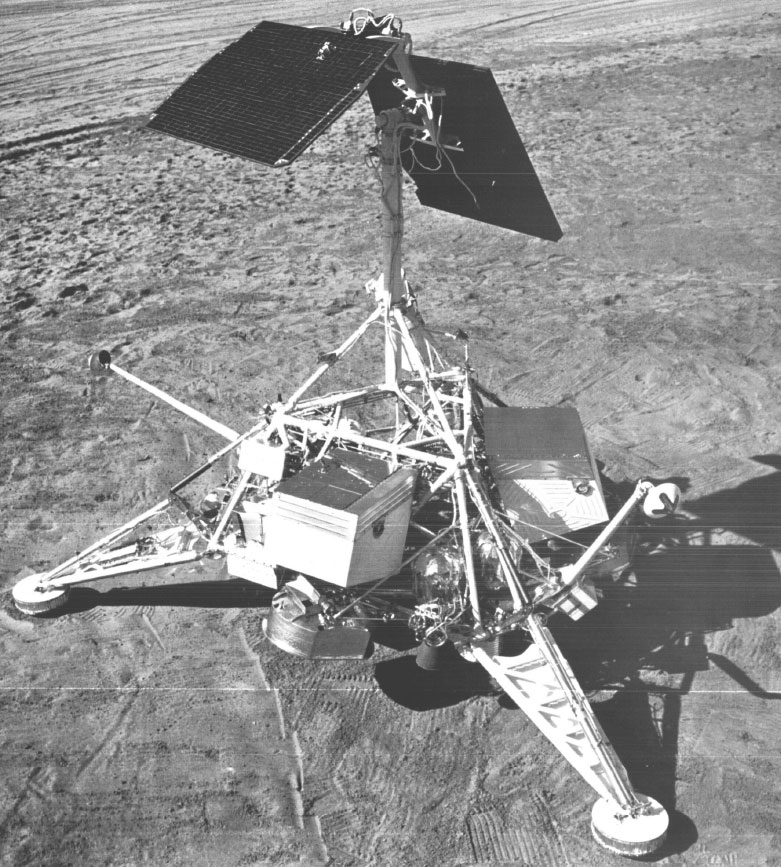
Hughes-built NASA Surveyor lunar lander.

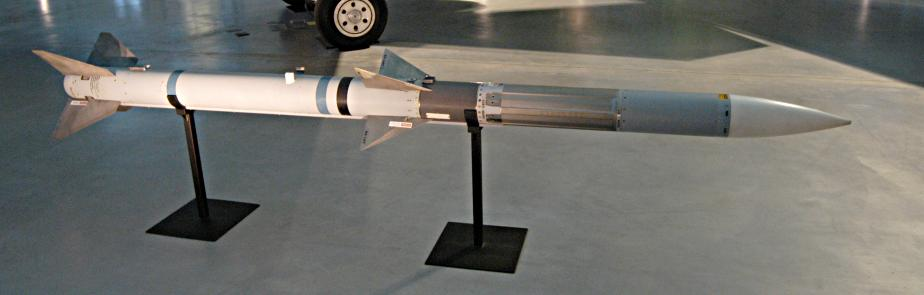
Hughes developed the AIM-120 AMRAAM, one of the world's most advanced air-to-air missiles.

During World War II, the company designed and built several prototype aircraft at Hughes Airport. These included the famous Hughes H-4 Hercules (better known by the public's nickname for it, the Spruce Goose), the H-1 racer, D-2, and the XF-11. However, the plant's hangars at Hughes Airport, the location of present-day Playa Vista in the Westside of Los Angeles, California, were primarily used as a branch plant for the construction of other companies' designs. At the start of the war, Hughes Aircraft had only four full-time employees; by the end of the war, the number was 80,000. During the war, the company was awarded contracts to build B-25 struts, centrifugal cannons, and machine gun feed chutes.

=== Post–World War II ===
Hughes Aircraft was one of many aerospace and defense companies which flourished in Southern California during and after World War II, and was at one time the largest employer in the area. However, employment had dropped to 800 by 1947. By the summer of 1947, certain politicians had become concerned about Hughes' alleged mismanagement of the Spruce Goose and the XF-11 photo reconnaissance plane project. They formed a special committee to investigate Hughes which culminated in a much-followed Senate investigation, one of the first to be televised to the public. Despite a highly critical committee report, Hughes was cleared.

The company then expanded into the booming electronics field, eventually employing 3,300 Ph.D.s. Hughes hired Ira Eaker, Harold L. George, and Tex Thornton to run the company. By 1953, the company employed 17,000 and had $600 million in government contracts.

In 1948, Hughes created a new division of the company, the Aerospace Group. Two Hughes engineers, Simon Ramo and Dean Wooldridge, had new ideas on the packaging of electronics to make complete fire control systems. Their MA-1 system combined signals from the aircraft's radar with a digital computer to automatically guide the interceptor aircraft into the proper position for firing missiles. At the same time other teams were working with the newly formed US Air Force on air-to-air missiles, delivering the AIM-4 Falcon, then known as the F-98. The MA-1/Falcon package, with several upgrades, was the primary interceptor weapon system of the USAF for many years, lasting into the 1980s. Having failed to reach an agreement with Howard Hughes regarding management problems, Ramo and Wooldridge resigned in September 1953 and founded the Ramo-Wooldridge Corporation, later to join Thompson Products to form the Thompson-Ramo-Wooldridge based in Canoga Park, with Hughes leasing space for nuclear research programs (present-day West Hills). The company became TRW in 1965, another aerospace company and a major competitor to Hughes Aircraft.

In 1951, Hughes Aircraft built a missile plant in Tucson, Arizona due to Howard Hughes' fear that his Culver City plant could be attacked. By the end of that year, the U.S. Air Force had purchased the property and contracted Hughes (and subsequently Raytheon) to operate the site as Air Force Plant 44.

In 1953, Howard Hughes donated Hughes Aircraft to the newly formed Howard Hughes Medical Institute (HHMI), allegedly as a way of avoiding taxes on its huge income. The next year, Lawrence A. "Pat" Hyland was hired as vice president and general manager of Hughes Aircraft; he would ultimately become company president and CEO after Howard Hughes' death in 1976.

Under Hyland's guidance, the Aerospace Group continued to diversify and become massively profitable, and became a primary focus of the company. It developed radar systems, electro-optical systems, the first working laser, aircraft computer systems, missile systems, ion-propulsion engines (for space travel), and many other advanced technologies. The Electronic Properties Information Center (EPIC) of the United States was hosted at the Hughes Culver City library in the 1970s. EPIC published the multi-volume Handbook of Electronic Materials as public documents.

Nobel Laureates Richard Feynman and Murray Gell-Mann had Hughes connections: Feynman would hold weekly seminars at Hughes Research Laboratories, and Gell-Mann shared an office with Malcolm R. Currie, later a chairman of the board and chief executive officer at Hughes Aircraft. Greg Jarvis and Ronald McNair, two of the astronauts on the last flight of the Space Shuttle Challenger, were Hughes alumni.

=== Ground Systems Group ===
Hughes Aircraft Ground Systems Group was located in Fullerton, California. The facility was 3 million square feet and included manufacturing, laboratories, offices, and a Munson road test course. It designed, developed, and produced the Air Defense Systems that replaced the Semi Automatic Defense Ground Environment (SAGE) in the United States with the Joint Surveillance System (JSS) AN/FYQ-93 including NORAD with Joint Tactical Information Distribution System (JTIDS) and provided defense systems and air traffic control systems around the world. These systems are massive and at its peak Ground Systems Group employed 15,000 people and generated revenue in excess of $1 billion per year.

These systems included the following Ground Systems Group subsystems: Computer H5118, Consoles HMD-22 and HMD-44, Liquid Crystal Large Screen Displays, and Software that set the standard for software development based on science and engineering, starting with the Combat Grande System. Ground Systems Group was known to push technology envelopes in the computers, displays, local area networks, human interfaces, and software in their systems. They also blazed the path to very highly distributed human intensive systems.

=== Hughes Space and Communications Group ===
In 1963, Hughes Space and Communications Group and the Hughes Space Systems Division built the world's first geosynchronous communications satellite, Syncom, followed by the first geosynchronous weather satellite, ATS-1, in 1966. Later that year, their Surveyor 1 made the first soft landing on the Moon as part of the lead-up to the Moon landings in Project Apollo. Hughes also built Pioneer Venus in 1978, which performed the first extensive radar mapping of Venus, and the Galileo probe that flew to Jupiter in the 1990s. The company built nearly 40 percent of commercial satellites in service worldwide in 2000.

=== Hughes helicopter business ===
In 1947, Howard Hughes redirected Hughes Aircraft's efforts from airplanes to helicopters. The effort began in earnest in 1948, when helicopter manufacturer Kellett Aircraft Co. sold its latest design to Hughes for production. The XH-17 "Flying Crane" first flew in October 1952, but was commercially unsuccessful. In 1955, Howard Hughes split the helicopter production unit from Hughes Aircraft Company, and reconstituted it with Hughes Tool Company, calling it Hughes Tool Company's Aircraft Division. The Aircraft Division had a focus on the production of light helicopters, mainly the Hughes 269/300 and the OH-6 Cayuse/Hughes 500.

=== Howard Hughes Medical Institute sells Hughes Aircraft Company ===
Hughes left no will, and following his death in 1976, there were numerous claims to his estate. A Hughes executive and a Hughes lawyer claimed they had the right to set up an "executive committee" to take over the running of the HHMI and its Hughes Aircraft subsidiary. The attorney general of Delaware Richard R. Wier Jr. challenged this and filed suit in 1978. Charles M. Oberly continued the action when he became attorney general in 1983. Oberly stated he wished to see an independent board of trustees to ensure both that the institute fulfilled its charitable mission and that it did not continue to operate as a tax shelter.

In January 1984, Judge Grover C. Brown ruled that the Chancery Court should appoint the trustees because Hughes had not left a succession plan. Brown asked for both the executive committee and the attorney general's office to submit a list of recommendations that he could approve. Brown approved a list in April 1984. In January 1985, the new board of trustees of the HHMI announced they would sell Hughes Aircraft either by private sale or public stock offering.

=== Hughes Electronics Corporation ===
Logo of Hughes Electronics

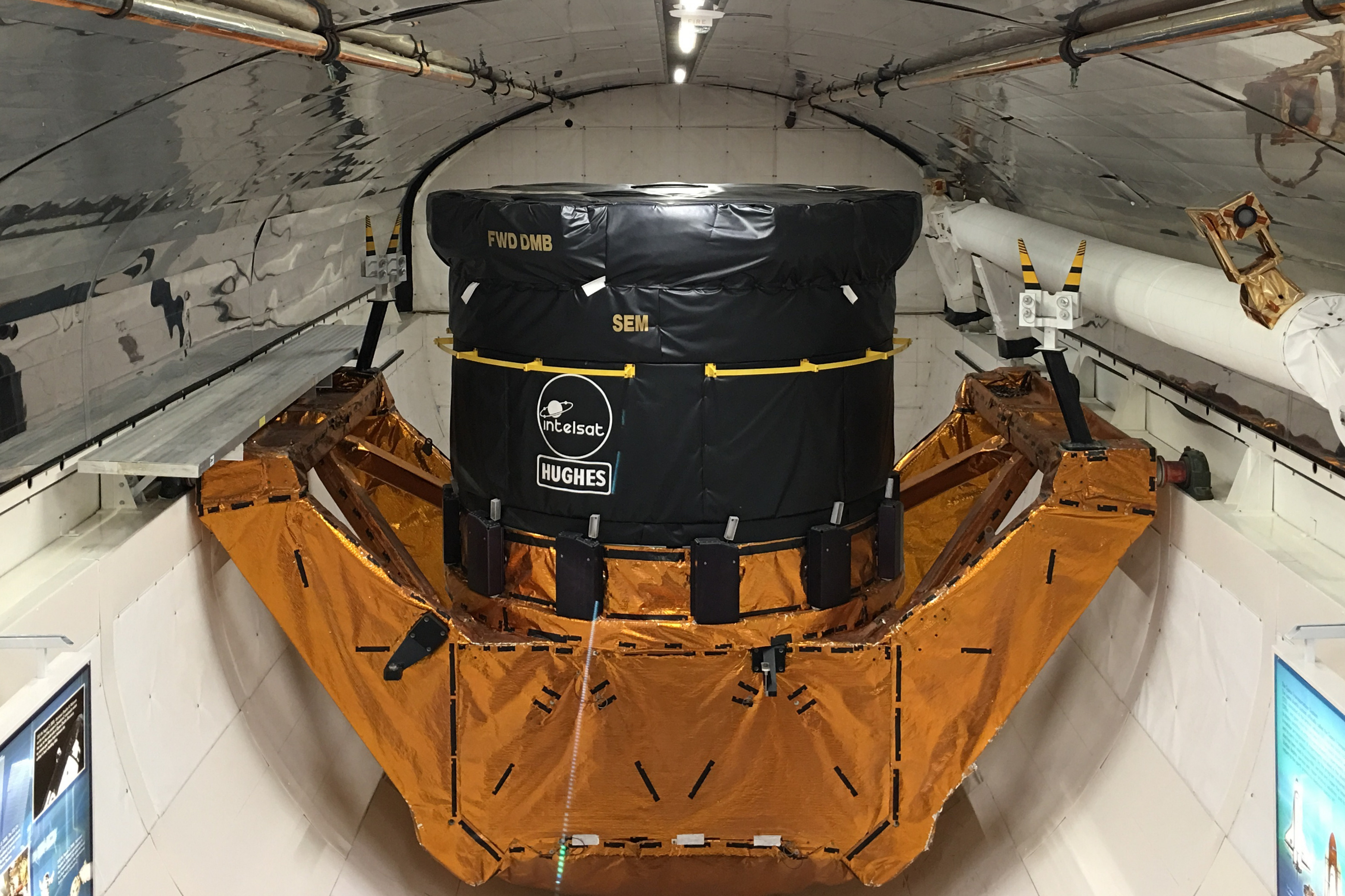
Mock-up of a Hughes satellite kickmotor inside the Space Shuttle Independence (similar to the one carried on STS-49)

On June 5, 1985, General Motors was announced as the winner of a secretive five-month sealed-bid auction. Other bidders included the Ford Motor Company and Boeing. The purchase was completed on December 20, 1985, for an estimated $5.2 billion, $2.7 billion in cash and the rest in 50 million shares of GM Class H stock.

On December 31, 1985, General Motors merged Hughes Aircraft with its Delco Electronics unit to form Hughes Electronics Corporation, an independent subsidiary.

In August 1992, Hughes Aircraft completed its purchase of General Dynamics' missile businesses for $450 million. This brought the Tomahawk Cruise Missile, Advanced Cruise Missile, Standard missile, Stinger missile, Phalanx Close-in weapon system, and Rolling Airframe Missile into Hughes' portfolio.

In 1994, Hughes Electronics introduced DirecTV, the world's first high-powered DBS service. In 1995, its Hughes Space and Communications division became the largest supplier of commercial satellites. That same year, the group purchased Magnavox Electronic Systems from the Carlyle Group. In 1996, Hughes Electronics and PanAmSat agreed to merge their fixed satellite services into a new publicly held company, also called PanAmSat, with Hughes Electronics as majority shareholder.

In 1995, Hughes Aircraft sold its Technology Products Division (automated wire and die bonder) to an investor group led by Citicorp and incorporated the division as Palomar Technologies. In 2008, Citicorp sold the bonder division to the current management team at Palomar Technologies.

In 1997, GM transferred Delco Electronics to its Delphi Automotive Systems business. Later that year, the assets of Hughes Aircraft were sold to Raytheon for $9.5 billion. The remaining companies remained under the Hughes Electronics name and within GM.

In 2000, Boeing purchased three units within Hughes Electronics Corp.: Hughes Space and Communications Co., Hughes Electron Dynamics, and Spectrolab Inc., in addition to Hughes Electronics' interest in HRL, the company's primary research laboratory. The four joined Boeing Satellite Systems, a company subsidiary, later becoming the Satellite Development Center, part of Boeing Integrated Defense Systems.

In 2003, the remaining parts of Hughes Electronics (DirecTV, DirecTV Latin America, PanAmSat, Hughes Network Systems) were purchased by News Corporation from GM and renamed the DirecTV Group.

== Corporate legacy ==
The wide range of science and technology developed by Hughes Aircraft never included medical applications because the company was owned by the Howard Hughes Medical Institute (HHMI). This restriction was imposed to avoid even the appearance of a conflict of interest.

The money provided to HHMI by Hughes Aircraft led to major improvements in genetics and cancer research.

The city of Fullerton, California, named Hughes Drive after the site that the company formerly occupied before 1997. After Hughes closed, the city developed Amerige Heights, a residential community.

== Timeline ==
Hughes logo, adopted during the period (1997-2000) between the sales of portions of the company to Raytheon and Boeing. Each subsidiary of Hughes Space and Communications Company placed their name at the bottom of the logo.

- 1932: Howard Hughes formed Hughes Aircraft Company as a division of Hughes Tool Company.
- 1948: Hughes formed the Aerospace Group within the company, divided into:
  - Hughes Space and Communications Group
  - Hughes Space Systems Division
- 1951: Hughes Aircraft opened missile plant in Tucson, Arizona.
- 1953: The Howard Hughes Medical Institute (HHMI) was formed, and Hughes Aircraft reformed as a subsidiary of the foundation. The Internal Revenue Service unsuccessfully challenged its "charitable" status which made it tax-exempt.
- 1955: Hughes formed its helicopter division, Aircraft Division.
- 1960: The first laser was produced at Hughes Research Laboratories, by Theodore Maiman.
- 1961: Hughes Research Laboratories completed their move to Malibu, California.
- 1972: Hughes sold the tool division of Hughes Tool Company. His remaining interests were transferred to the newly formed holding company, the Summa Corporation. This included Toolco Aircraft and Hughes' property and other businesses. Summa renamed itself The Howard Hughes Corporation in 1994, was sold to the Rouse Company in 1996, and was acquired by General Growth Properties (GGP) in 2004. GGP filed for bankruptcy in 2009, resulting in The Howard Hughes Corporation reforming as a spin-off company.
- 1976: Toolco Aircraft became Hughes Helicopters.
- 1976: Howard Hughes died at the age of 70, leaving no will.
- 1984: The Summa Corporation sold Hughes Helicopters to McDonnell Douglas for $500 million; it was soon renamed McDonnell Douglas Helicopters.
- 1984: The Delaware Court of Chancery appointed eight trustees to the Howard Hughes Medical Institute; they decided to sell Hughes Aircraft.
- 1985: The HHMI sold Hughes Aircraft to General Motors for $5.2 billion. This was merged with GM's Delco Electronics to form Hughes Electronics Corporation. This group then consisted of:
  - Delco Electronics Corporation
  - Hughes Aircraft Company
- 1987: Hughes Aircraft Company acquired M/A-COM Telecommunications, to form Hughes Network Systems.
- 1994: Hughes Electronics introduced DirecTV.
- 1995: Hughes Space and Communications Company became the world's biggest supplier of commercial satellites.
- 1995: Hughes Electronics acquired Magnavox Electronic Systems from the Carlyle Group.
- 1995: Hughes Aircraft acquired CAE-Link; CAE-Link was part of the original company founded by Edwin Link, inventor of the flight simulator.
- 1996: Hughes Electronics and PanAmSat agreed to merge their fixed satellite services into a new publicly held company, also called PanAmSat with Hughes Electronics as majority shareholder.
- 1997: GM transferred Delco Electronics from Hughes Electronics to its Delphi Automotive Systems. Delphi became independent in 1999.
- 1997: The aerospace and defense operations of Hughes Electronics (Hughes Aircraft) merged with Raytheon; Raytheon also acquired one half of the Hughes Research Laboratories.
- 2000: Hughes Space and Communications Company remained independent until 2000, when it was purchased by Boeing and became Boeing Satellite Development Center. Boeing purchased one third of the HRL Laboratories, LLC which was then co-owned by Boeing, GM and Raytheon.
- 2003: The remaining parts of Hughes Electronics (DirecTV, DirecTV Latin America, PanAmSat and Hughes Network Systems) were purchased by News Corporation and renamed The DirecTV Group.
- 2003: Newscorp sold PanAmSat to Kohlberg Kravis Roberts & Co. (KKR) in August 2004.
- 2004: Director Martin Scorsese used the Hughes Aircraft stage in Playa Vista to film the motion-capture sequences in the film The Aviator.
- 2004: SkyTerra Communications, Inc. completed its purchase of 100% controlling interest in Hughes Network Systems from the DirecTV Group in January 2006.

== Technologies, systems, and products ==
=== Air Defense and Air Traffic Control systems ===
- Japanese Tactical Air Weapons Control System - JTAWCS
- Swiss Air Defense System - FLORIDA
- Spain Air Defense System - Combat Grande
- Tactical Air Weapons Control System
- Joint Surveillance System
- German Air Defense Ground Environment (GEADGE)
  - Integrated NATO Air Defense System
  - NATO Air Defence Ground Environment (NADGE) - NSPA
- Airborne Early Warning / Ground Environment Integration Segment (AEGIS)
- Canadian Air Traffic Control System
- Korean Air Traffic Control System
- Joint Tactical Information Distribution System (JTIDS)
- AN/MPQ-64 Sentinel
- AN/TPQ-36 Firefinder radar
- AN/TPQ-37 Firefinder radar

=== Hughes Research Laboratories ===
- HRL Laboratories

=== Howard Hughes Medical Institute ===
- Howard Hughes Medical Institute

=== Aircraft ===
- Hughes D-2
- Hughes H-1 Racer
- Hughes H-4 Hercules
- Hughes XF-11

=== Missiles ===
- AIM-4 Falcon
  - AIM-26 Falcon
  - AIM-47 Falcon
- AIM-54 Phoenix
- AIM-120 AMRAAM
- AGM-65 Maverick
- BGM-71 TOW
- Brazo

=== Spacecraft ===
- HS-333
  - Anik (satellite)
- Jarvis (rocket)
- Magellan (spacecraft)
- Morelos Satellite System
- Paksat-1 satellite
- Pioneer program
  - Pioneer Venus Multiprobe
  - Pioneer Venus Orbiter
- Surveyor program
  - Surveyor 1
  - Surveyor 2
  - Surveyor 3
  - Surveyor 4
  - Surveyor 5
  - Surveyor 6
  - Surveyor 7

=== Torpedo ===
- Mk-48 ADCAP

== Bibliography ==
- Bartlett, Donald L.; Steele, James B. (1979). Howard Hughes: his life and madness. New York City: W.W. Norton & Company, Inc. ISBN 0-393-32602-0.
- Francillon, René J. (1990). McDonnell Douglas Aircraft since 1920. Vol. II. Annapolis, Maryland: Naval Institute Press. ISBN 1-55750-550-0.
- Gart, Jason H. "Electronics and Aerospace Industry in Cold War Arizona, 1945–1968: Motorola, Hughes Aircraft, Goodyear Aircraft". Ph.D. diss., Arizona State University, 2006.
- Marrett, George J. Howard Hughes: Aviator, Naval Institute Press, 2004.
- Marrett, George J. Testing Death: Hughes Aircraft Test Pilots and Cold War Weaponry, Praeger Publishing, 2006.
- Parker, Dana T. Building Victory: Aircraft Manufacturing in the Los Angeles Area in World War II, Cypress, CA. ISBN 978-0-9897906-0-4.
- D. Kenneth Richardson (2011). Hughes After Howard: The Story of Hughes Aircraft Company. Sea Hill Press. ISBN 978-0-9708050-8-9.
- Walter Sobkiw (2011). Systems Practices as Common Sense. CassBeth. ISBN 978-0-9832530-8-2.
