= Hughes H-1 Racer =

Racing aircraft in the US

H-1 Racer
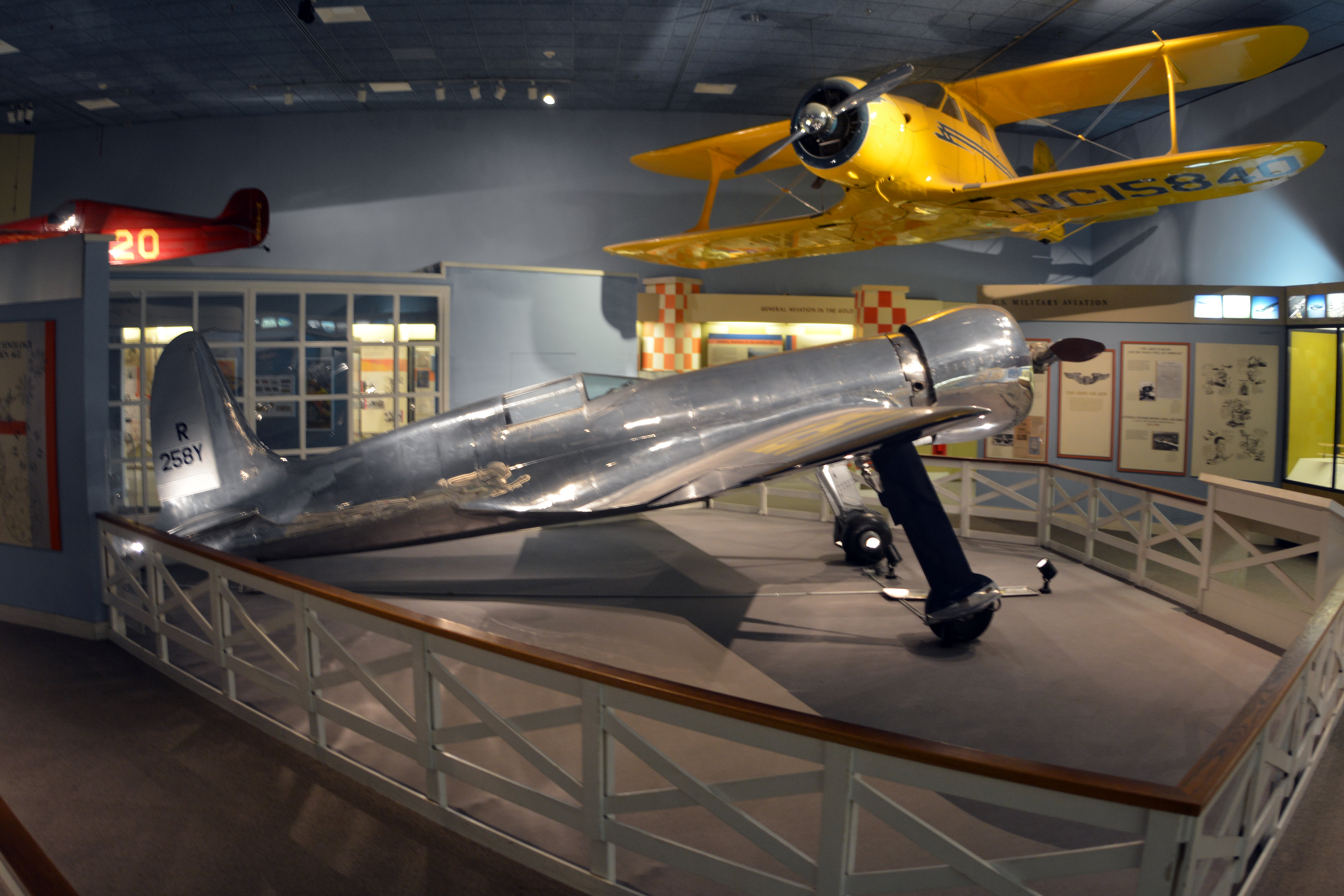
- The H-1 Racer at the National Air and Space Museum (below)

General information
- Type: Racing aircraft Long-range aircraft [for record attempt]
- Manufacturer: Hughes Aircraft
- Designer: Richard Palmer
- Primary user: Howard Hughes
- Number built: 2 (1 original, 1 replica)
- Registration: NR258Y

History
- Manufactured: 1935
- First flight: August 17, 1935
- Preserved at: National Air and Space Museum

The Hughes H-1 Racer is a racing aircraft built by Hughes Aircraft in 1935. Using different wings, it set both a world airspeed record and a transcontinental speed record across the United States. The H-1 Racer was the last aircraft built by a private individual to set the world speed record; most aircraft to hold the record since have been military designs.

== Development ==
During his work on his 1930 movie Hell's Angels, Howard Hughes employed Glenn Odekirk to maintain the fleet of over 100 aircraft used in the production. The two men shared a common interest in aviation and hatched a plan to build a record-beating aircraft. The aircraft was given many names, but is commonly known as the H-1. It was the first aircraft type produced by the Hughes Aircraft company. Design studies began in 1934 with an exacting scale model (over two feet in length) that was tested in the California Institute of Technology wind tunnel, revealing a speed potential of 365 mph (587 km/h).

== Design ==
Streamlining was a paramount design criterion, resulting in what has been retroactively described as "one of the cleanest and most elegant aircraft designs ever built." Many groundbreaking technologies were developed during construction, including individually machined flush rivets that left the aluminium skin of the aircraft extremely smooth. The H-1 had retractable main landing gear and a fully retractable hydraulically actuated tail skid to reduce the drag of a conventional wheel and maximize speed. It was fitted with a Pratt & Whitney R-1535 twin-row 14-cylinder radial engine of 1,535 cubic inches (25.15 L), originally rated at 700 horsepower (522 kW) but tuned to produce over 1,000 horsepower (750 kW). To contest both maximum speed and long-distance racing records the original short-span high-speed wings were replaced with a set of longer ones for long-distance flights.

== Operational history ==
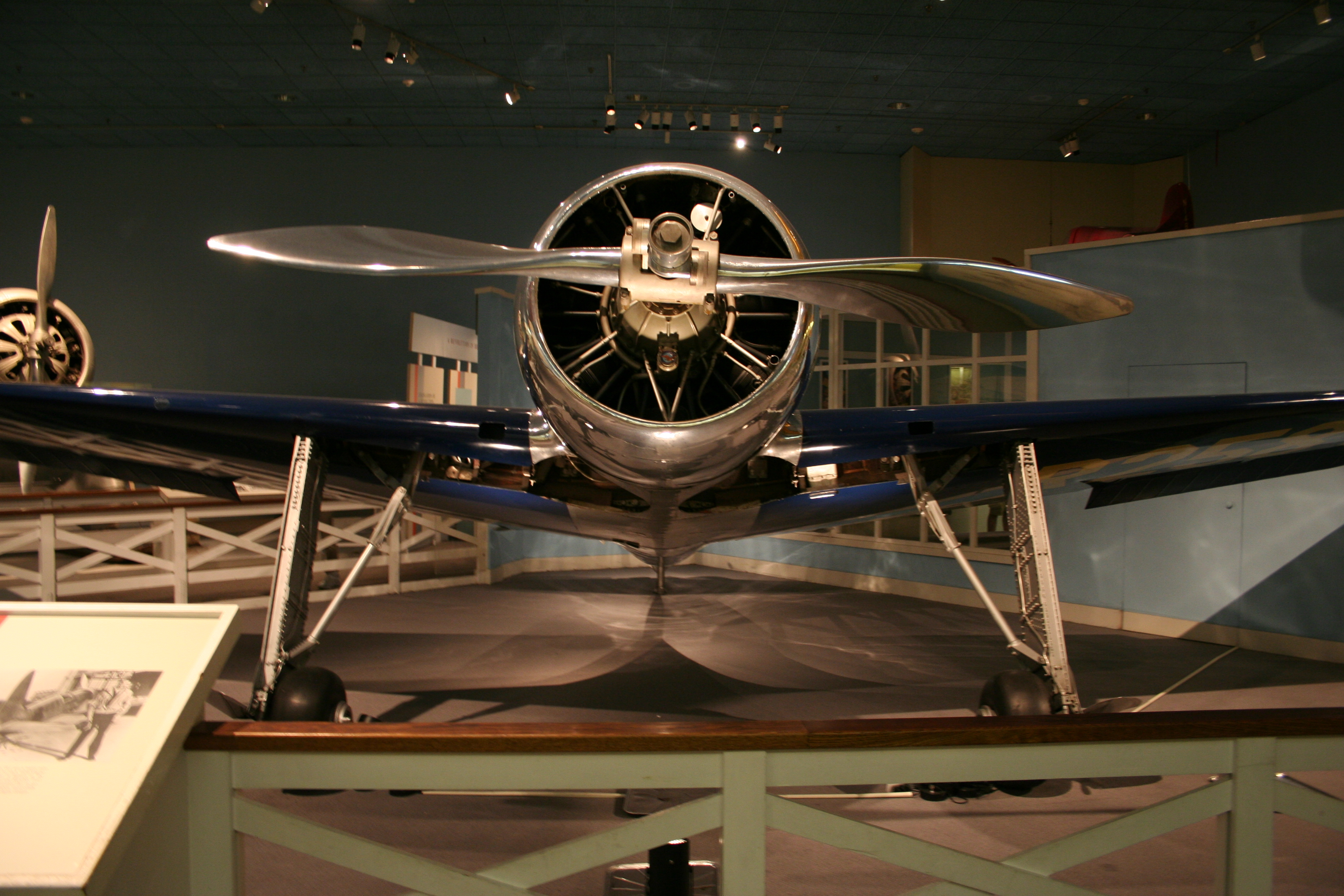
The H-1's two-bladed constant speed propeller was still the performance standard

Before the H-1 took to the air, the world absolute speed record was 440.7 mph (709.2 km/h), held by a Macchi M.C.72 seaplane and set in October 1934. The landplane record was 314.32 mph (505.85 km/h), averaged by Raymond Delmotte in a Caudron C.460.

Hughes piloted the H-1's maiden flight on August 17, 1935, at Grand Central Airport in Glendale, California. A month later, on 13 September at Martin Field near Santa Ana, California, Hughes broke the landplane speed record clocking 352.39 mph (567.12 km/h) averaged over four timed passes. The aircraft was loaded with a minimal amount of fuel to keep the weight down and Hughes was not supposed to make the 3rd and 4th passes. Exhausting the fuel supply, he crash-landed in a beet field south of Santa Ana without serious damage to either himself or the aircraft. When his compatriots arrived at the crash site Hughes said "We can fix her; she'll go faster."

Hughes later made minor changes to the H-1 Racer to make it more suitable for a transcontinental speed record attempt. The most significant change was the fitting of a new set of wings of increased span, giving it a lower wing loading. On January 19, 1937, a year and a half after setting the landplane speed record in the H-1, Hughes broke his own transcontinental speed record by flying non-stop from Los Angeles to New York City in 7 hours, 28 minutes and 25 seconds, smashing the previous time of 9 hours, 27 minutes by two hours. His average speed over the flight was 322 mph (518 km/h).

Considering that contemporary service aircraft were still biplanes, Hughes fully expected the United States Army Air Corps (USAAC) to embrace his aircraft's new design and make the H-1 the basis for a new generation of U.S. fighter aircraft. His efforts to persuade the Air Corps failed. In postwar testimony before the Senate, Hughes indicated that resistance to the innovative design was the basis for the USAAC rejection of the H-1, "I tried to sell that airplane to the Army but they turned it down because at that time the Army did not think a cantilever monoplane was proper for a pursuit ship...".

Aviation writer William Wraga asserts that the H-1 Racer inspired later radial engine fighters such as the Republic P-47 Thunderbolt, the Mitsubishi A6M Zero and the Focke-Wulf Fw 190, without offering any arguments for that being the case other than "Hughes showed them how it should be done." After the war, Hughes claimed that "it was quite apparent to everyone that the Mitsubishi A6M Zero had been copied from the Hughes H-1 Racer." He claimed the wing shape, tail design and general similarity of the Zero were derived from his racer. (Note: What Hughes actually asserted was that it seemed to him plain from examination of the two that the Zero was substantially a copy. An aside from Bill Utley, the Hughes company publicist, noted that one Al Ludwick had given details of pre-war inspection of the H-1 by Japanese generals at a New Jersey hangar. No evidence of copying beyond similarity of design is offered otherwise.) Jiro Horikoshi, designer of the Mitsubishi Zero strongly denied the allegation of the Hughes H-1 influencing the design of the Japanese fighter aircraft. The Hughes H-1 Racer is featured in the 1940 RKO Radio Pictures movie Men Against the Sky, playing the role of a prototype "McLean Aircraft" high-speed pursuit craft.

== Disposition ==
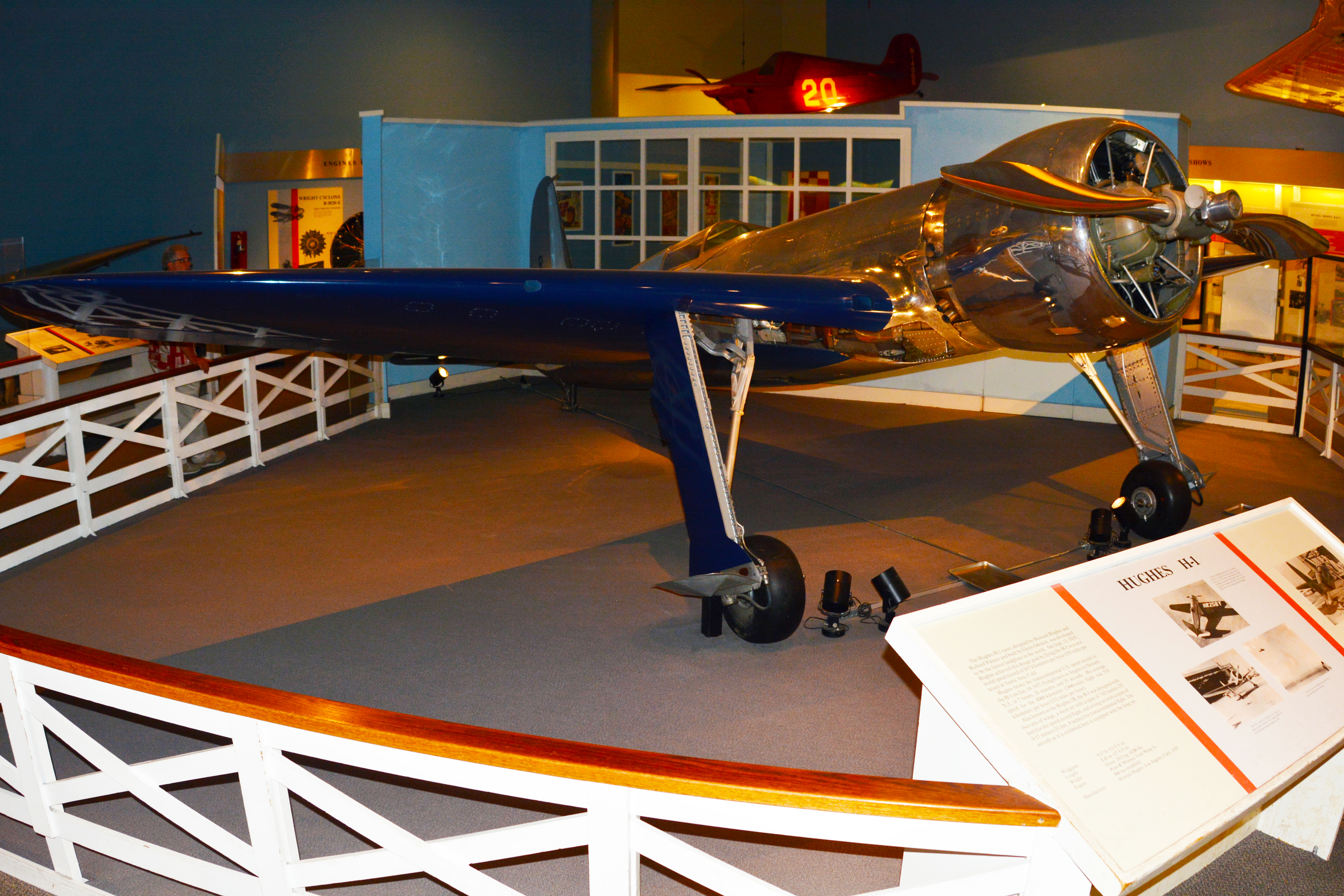
The original H-1 Racer on display at the National Air & Space Museum, November 2014

The original H-1 Racer was donated to the Smithsonian in 1975 and is on display at the National Air and Space Museum. Due to the ongoing construction project at the NASM, the Hughes Racer is being kept on display at the Steven F. Udvar-Hazy Center in Chantilly, VA. The wings and fuselage have been separated for space reasons.

== Replicas ==
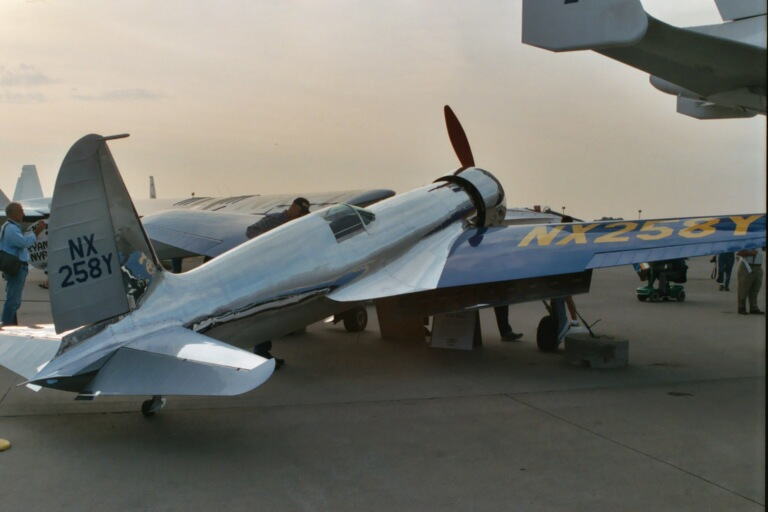
Jim Wright's H-1 replica, later destroyed in a crash

A static replica H-1 was displayed on a pole alongside Hughes' "Spruce Goose" at Long Beach when the latter aircraft was displayed in a dome adjacent to the Queen Mary until 1992. It was later displayed in the National Air Race Museum from 1993 to 1994, after which it was placed in storage.

Jim Wright of Cottage Grove, Oregon, built a full-scale replica of the H-1 that he first flew in 2002. His replica was so close to the original that the FAA granted it serial number 2 of the model. His achievement in recreating the aircraft was heralded in many aviation magazines. On August 4, 2003, Wright unveiled his H-1 replica at the 2003 AirVenture at Oshkosh, Wisconsin. On his way home to Oregon, he refueled the aircraft in Gillette, Wyoming. Wright met briefly with local reporters and said that the aircraft had been having propeller "gear problems". An hour after taking off, the aircraft crashed just north of the Old Faithful Geyser in Yellowstone National Park, killing Wright. The replica, slated to be used in the film The Aviator, was destroyed. (Note: Witnesses on the ground testify that Mr. Wright turned the aircraft away from park visitors and into a small bluff in an apparent attempt to spare those on the ground.) The official accident report detailed the failure of a counterweight on the constant speed propeller. On December 17, 2003, Cottage Grove State Airport was dedicated as Jim Wright Field.

Other non-flying replicas are displayed at the Thomas T. Beam Engineering Complex at the University of Nevada, Las Vegas (donated by the Howard Hughes Corporation in 1988) and the Santa Maria Museum of Flight. As of 2016, another H-1 replica is being built at the San Diego Air & Space Museum.

== Specifications (H-1 Racer, original wings) ==
Data from "Howard Hughes' H-1: The Search for the Fastest Plane in the World".

General characteristics

- Crew: 1
- Length: 27 ft 0 in (8.23 m)
- Wingspan: 31 ft 9 in (9.67 m)
- Height: 8 ft 0 in (2.4 m)
- Wing area: 138 sq ft (12.8 m^{2})
- Empty weight: 3,565 lb (1,620 kg)
- Gross weight: 5,492 lb (2,496 kg)
- Powerplant: 1 × Pratt & Whitney R-1535 Twin Wasp Junior radial engine, 1000 hp (750 kW)

Performance

- Maximum speed: 352 mph (566 km/h, 306 kn)
- Wing loading: 40 lb/sq ft (195 kg/m^{2})
- Power/mass: 0.13 hp/lb (210 W/kg)

== Gallery ==
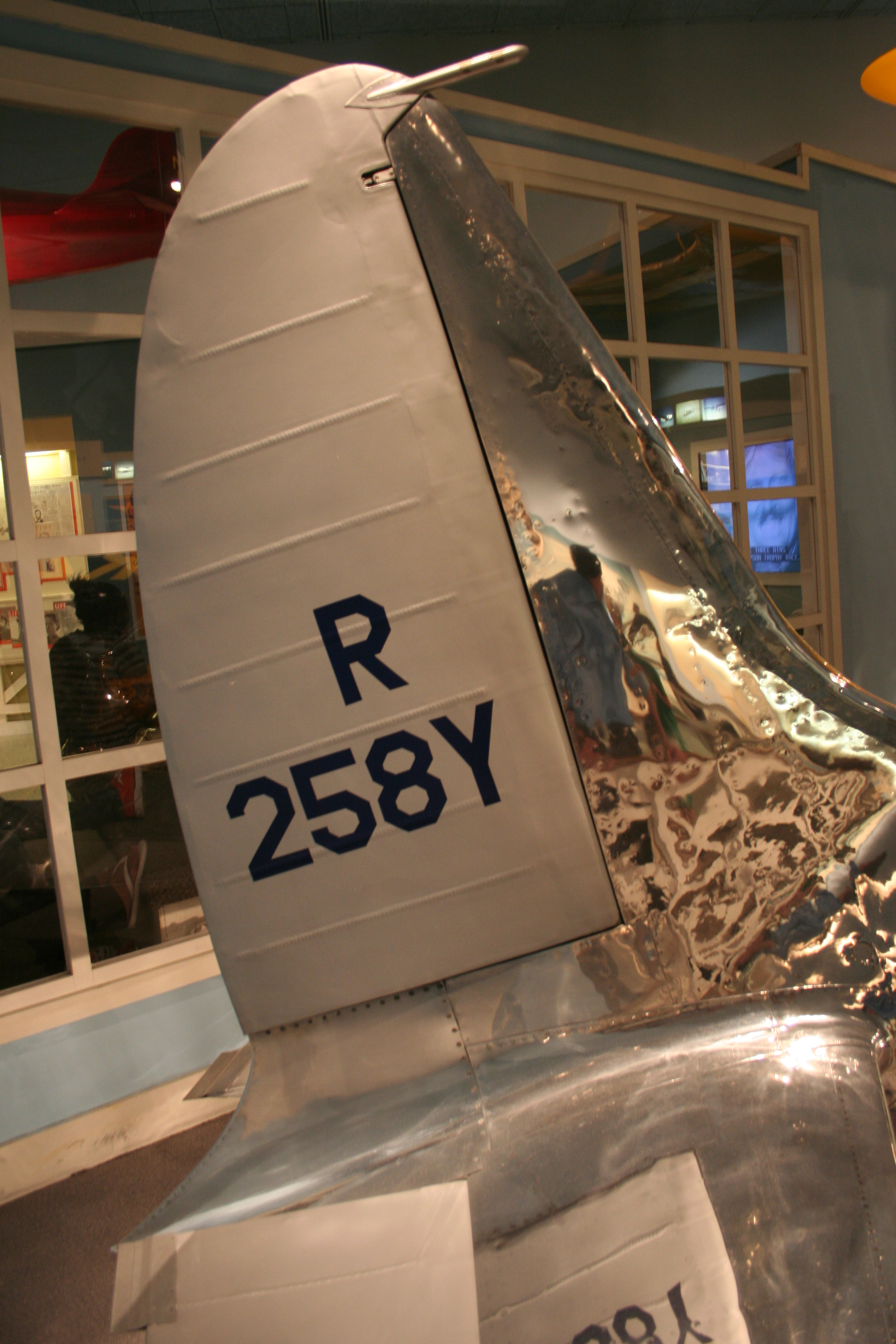
Tail structure

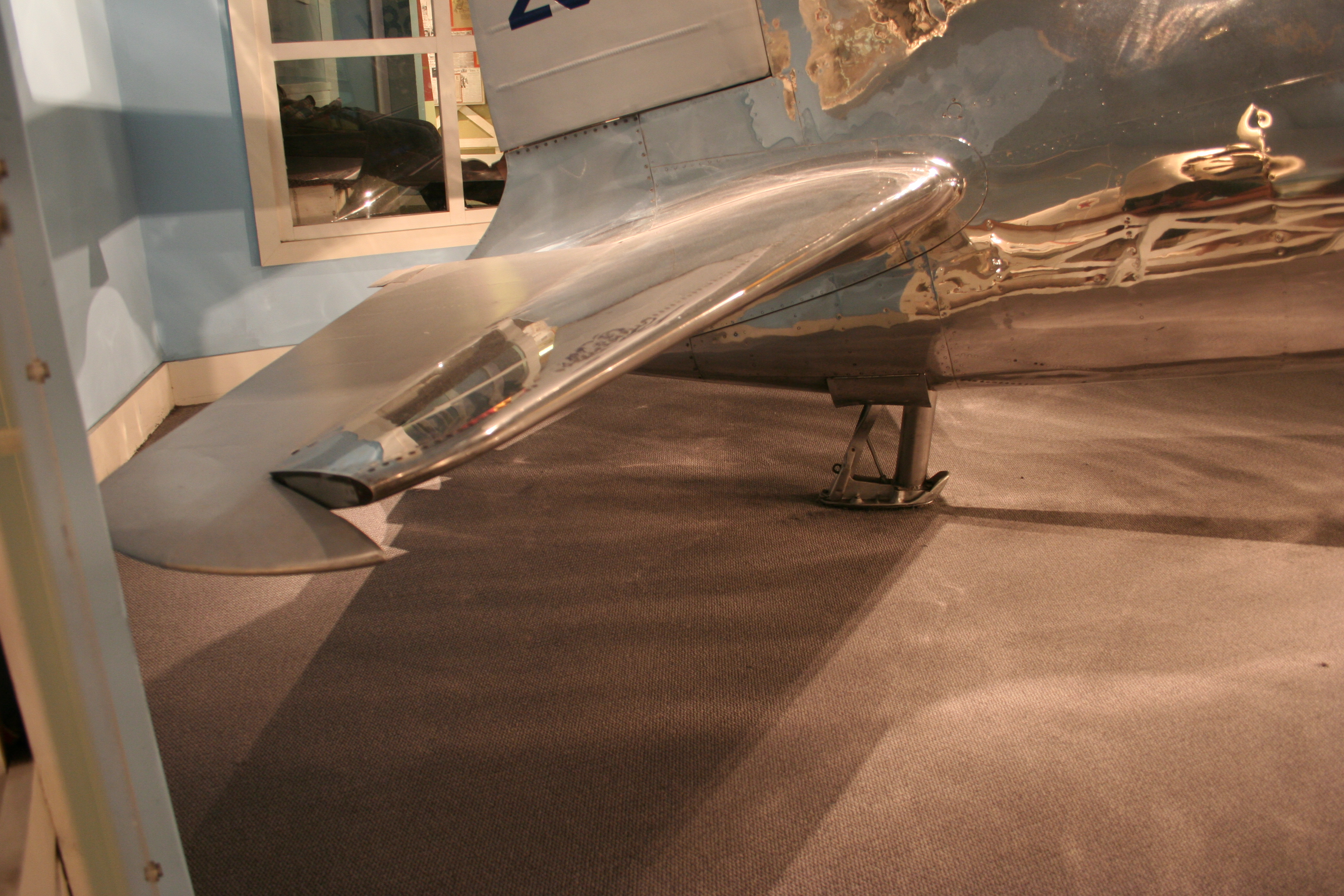
Rear landing skid

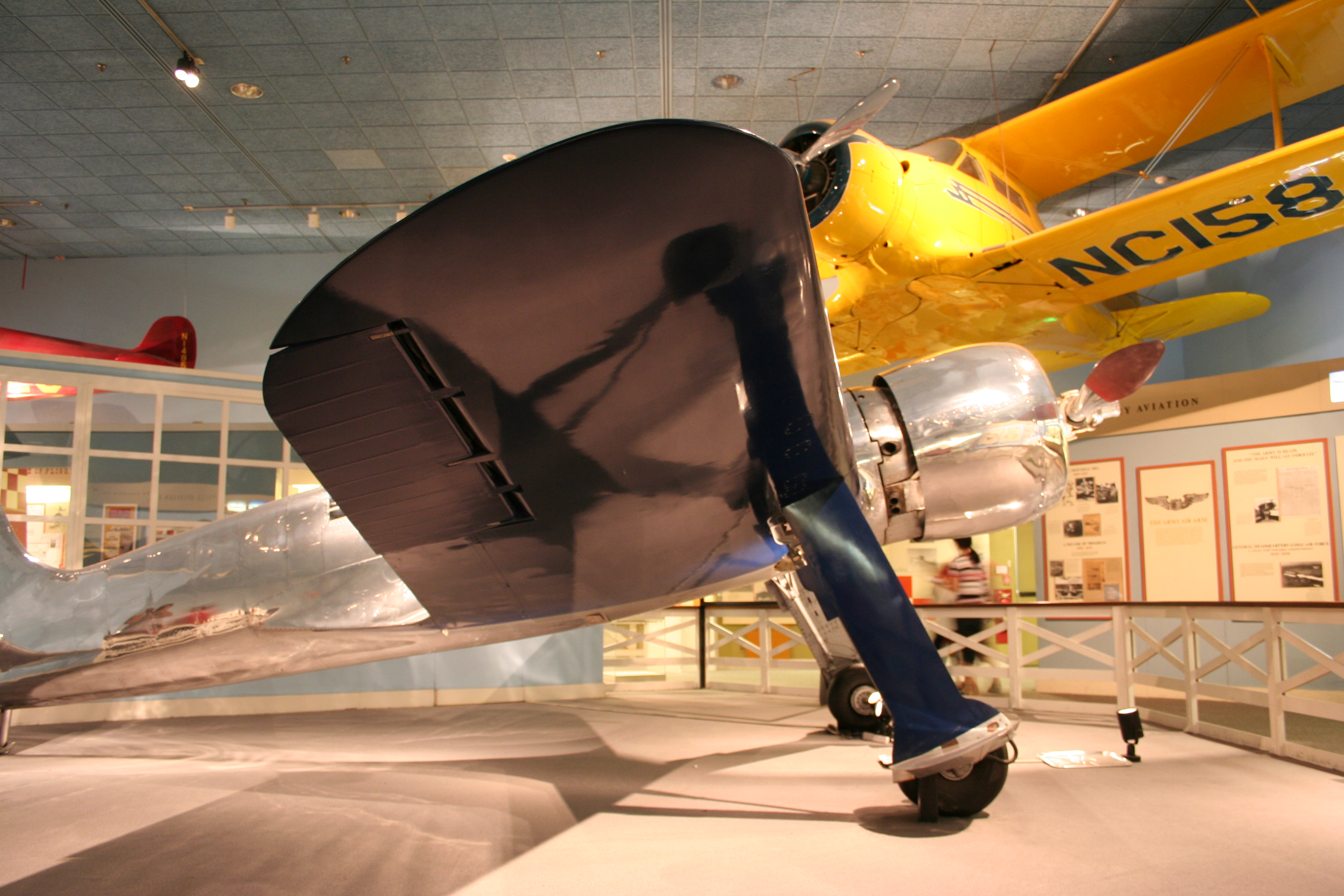
Right side

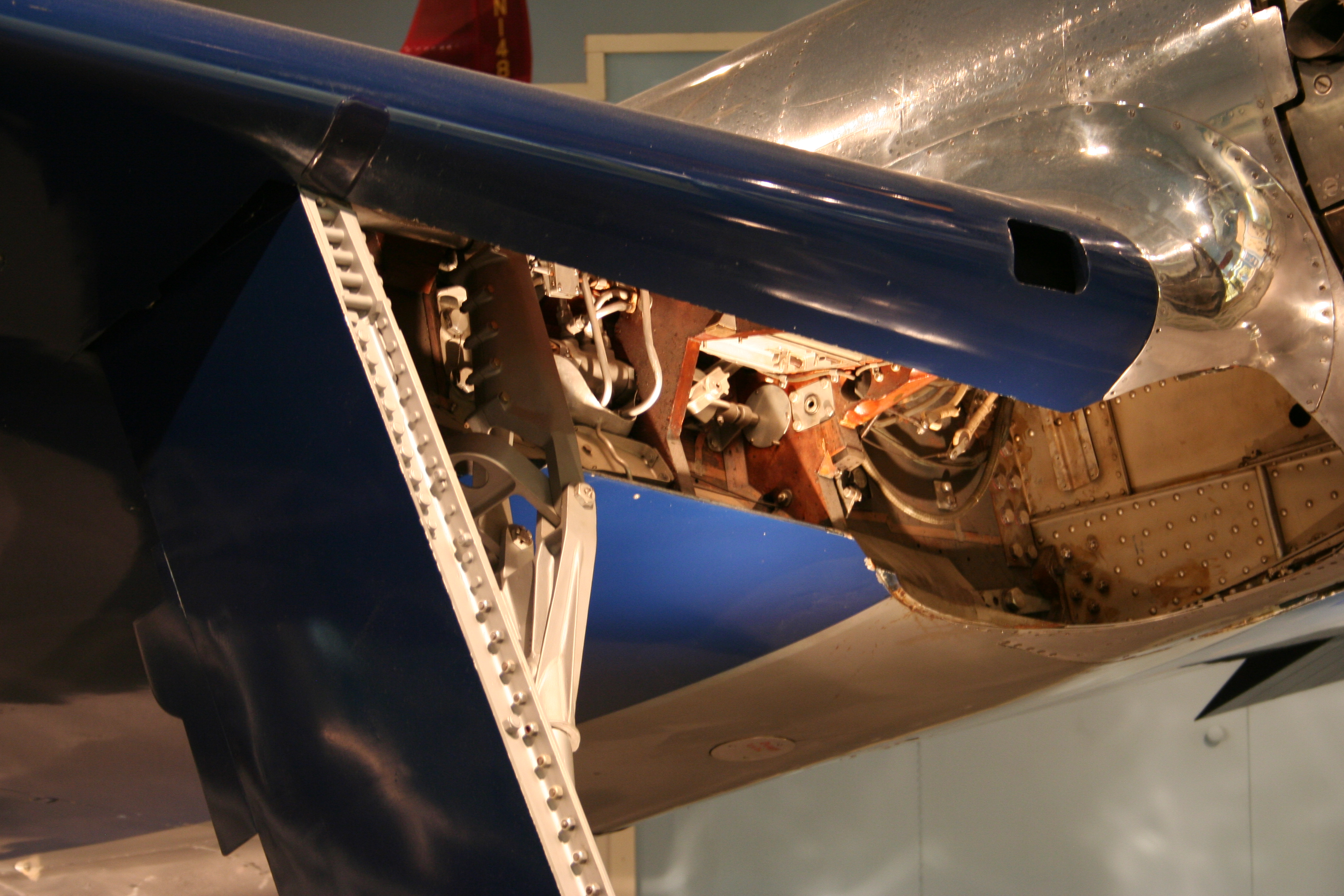
Detailed wood and metal work inside

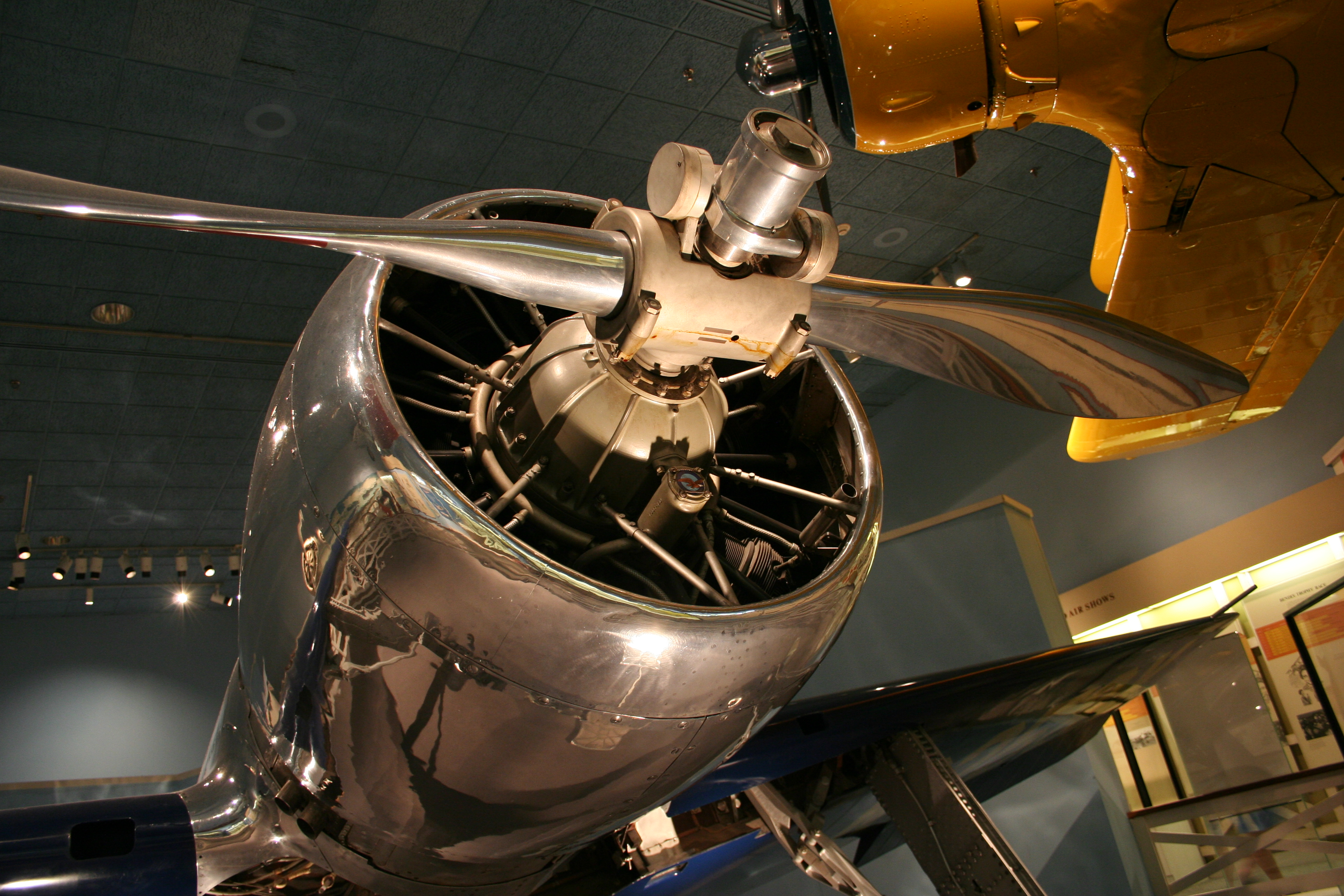
Propeller

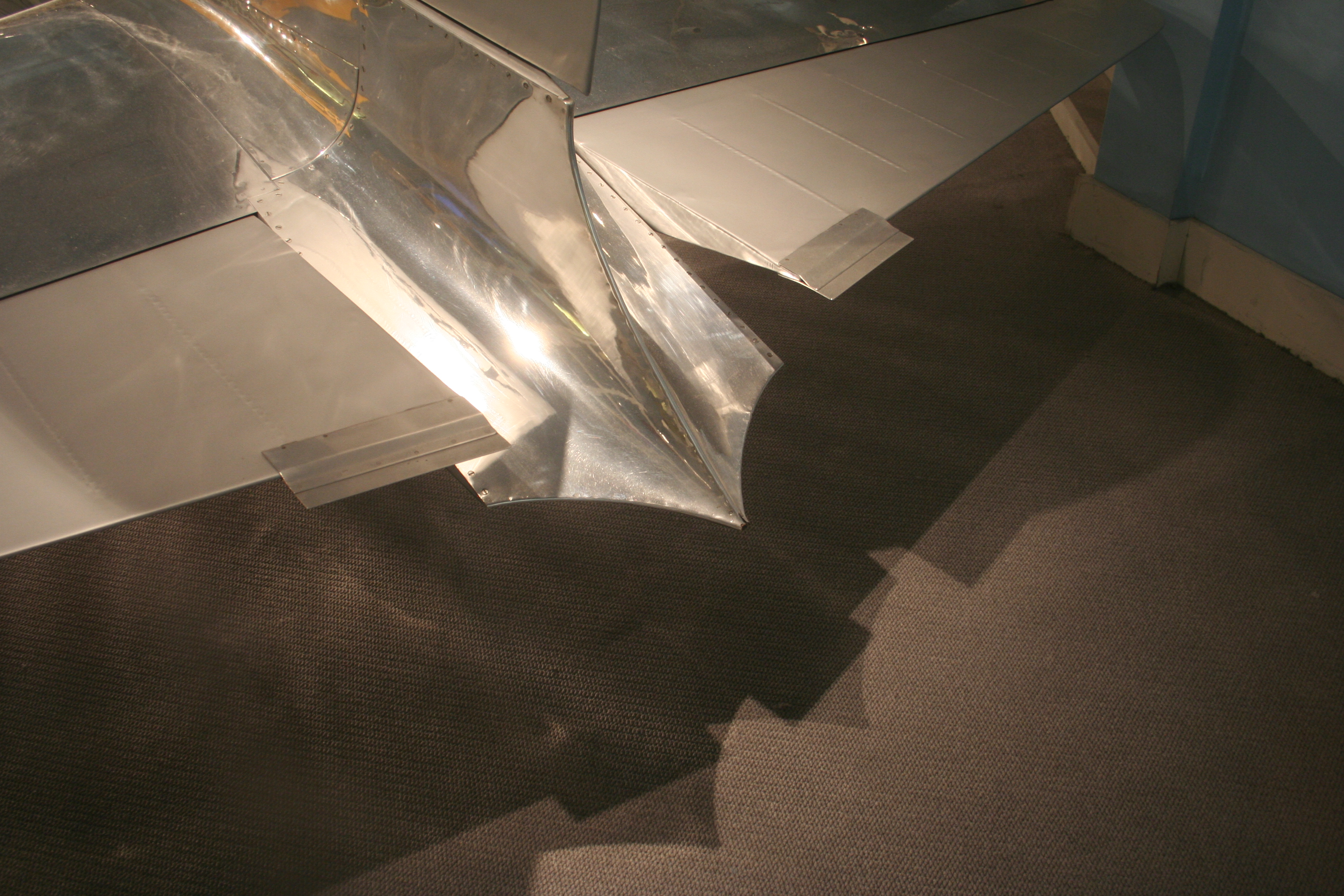
Streamlined tail

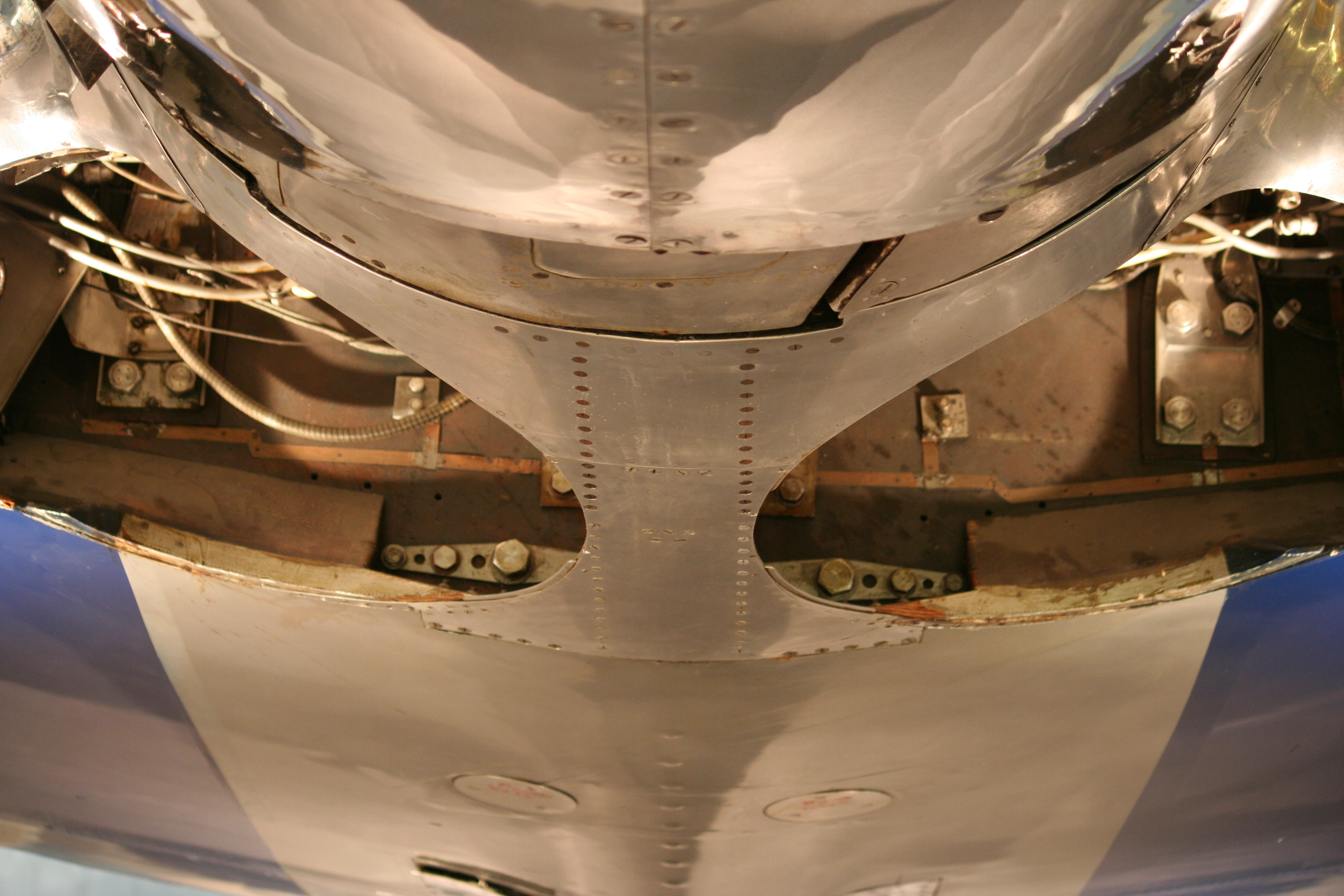
Flush metalwork for aerodynamics

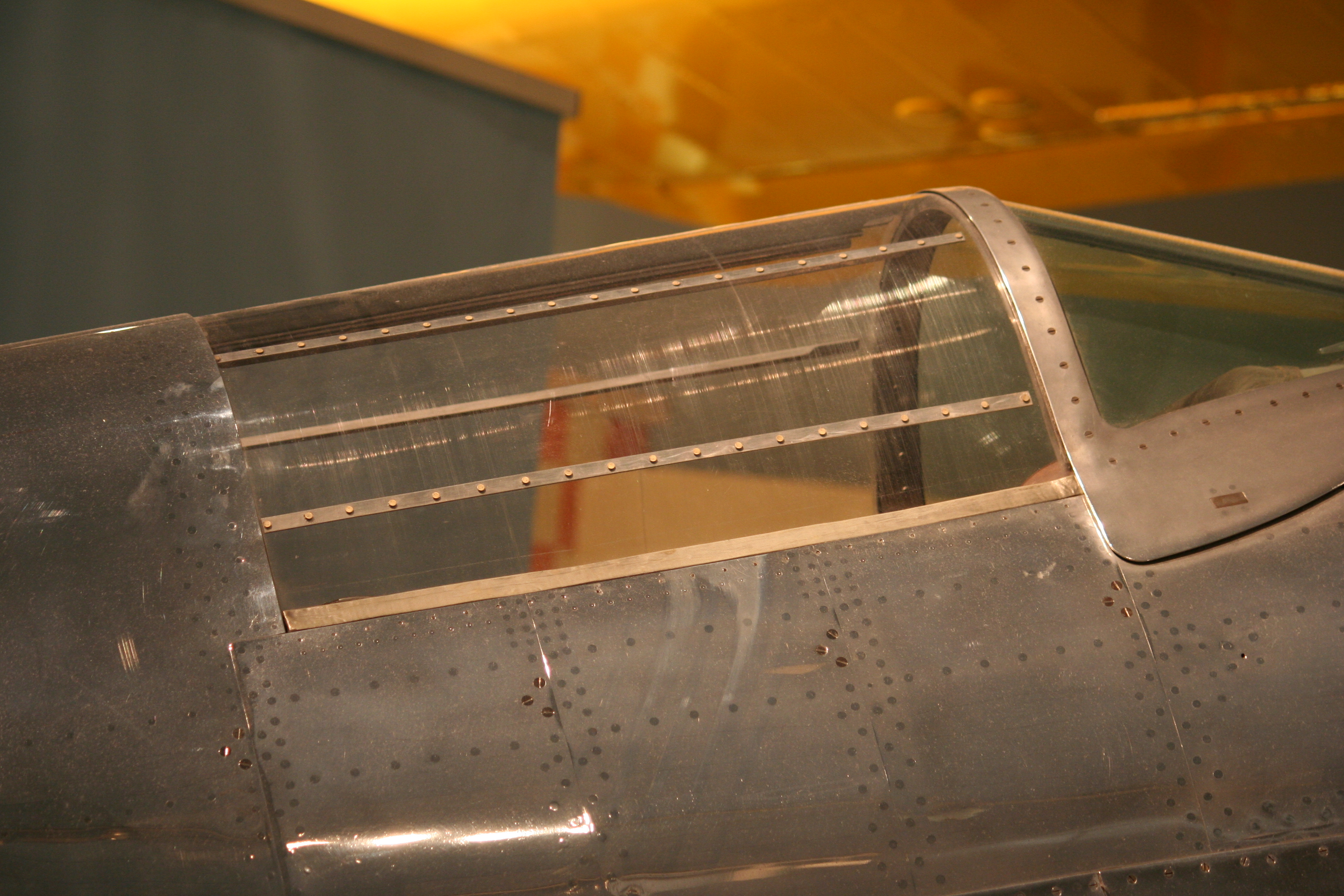
Canopy with flush metalwork

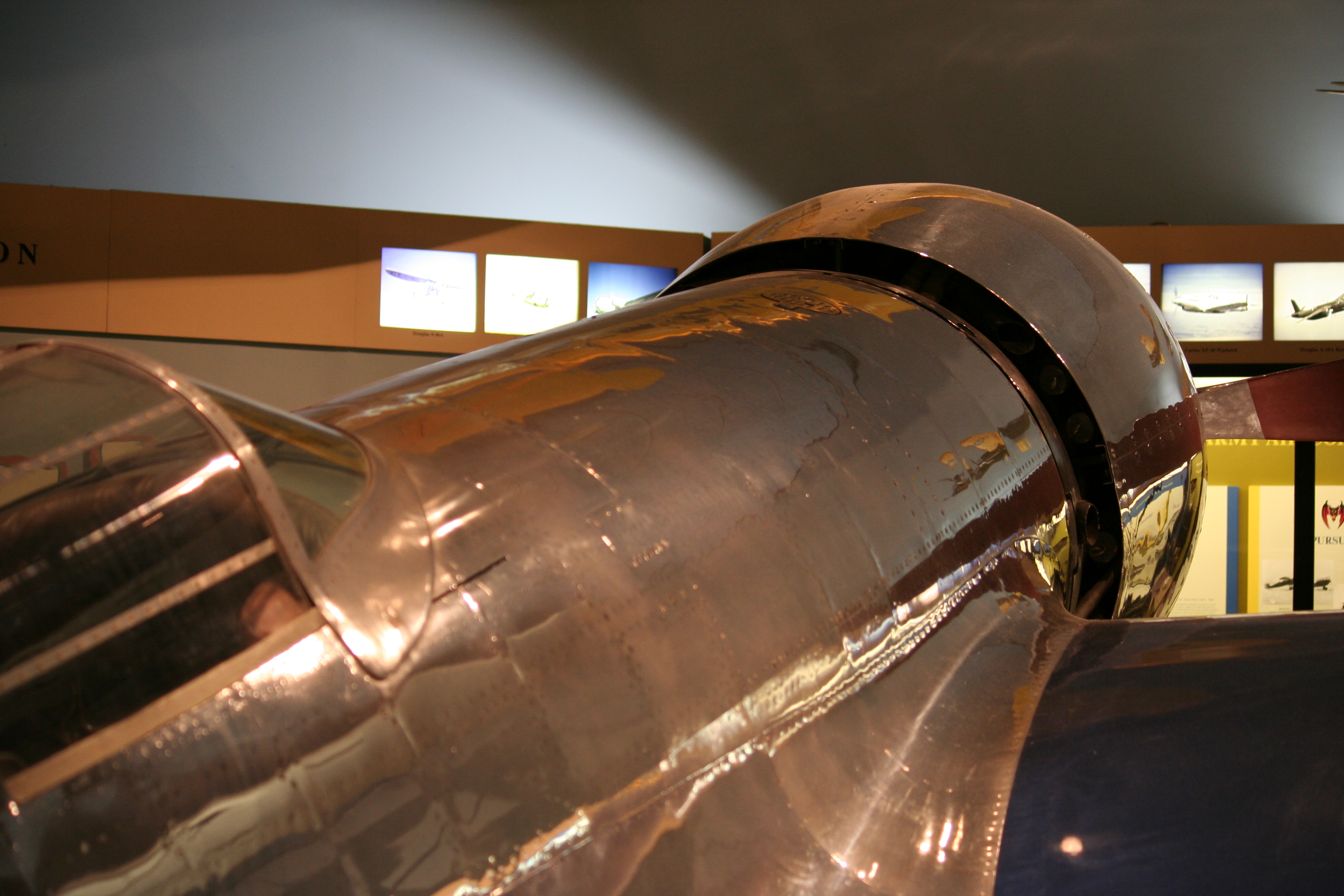
The radial engine nacelle is oversized to allow exhaust to escape

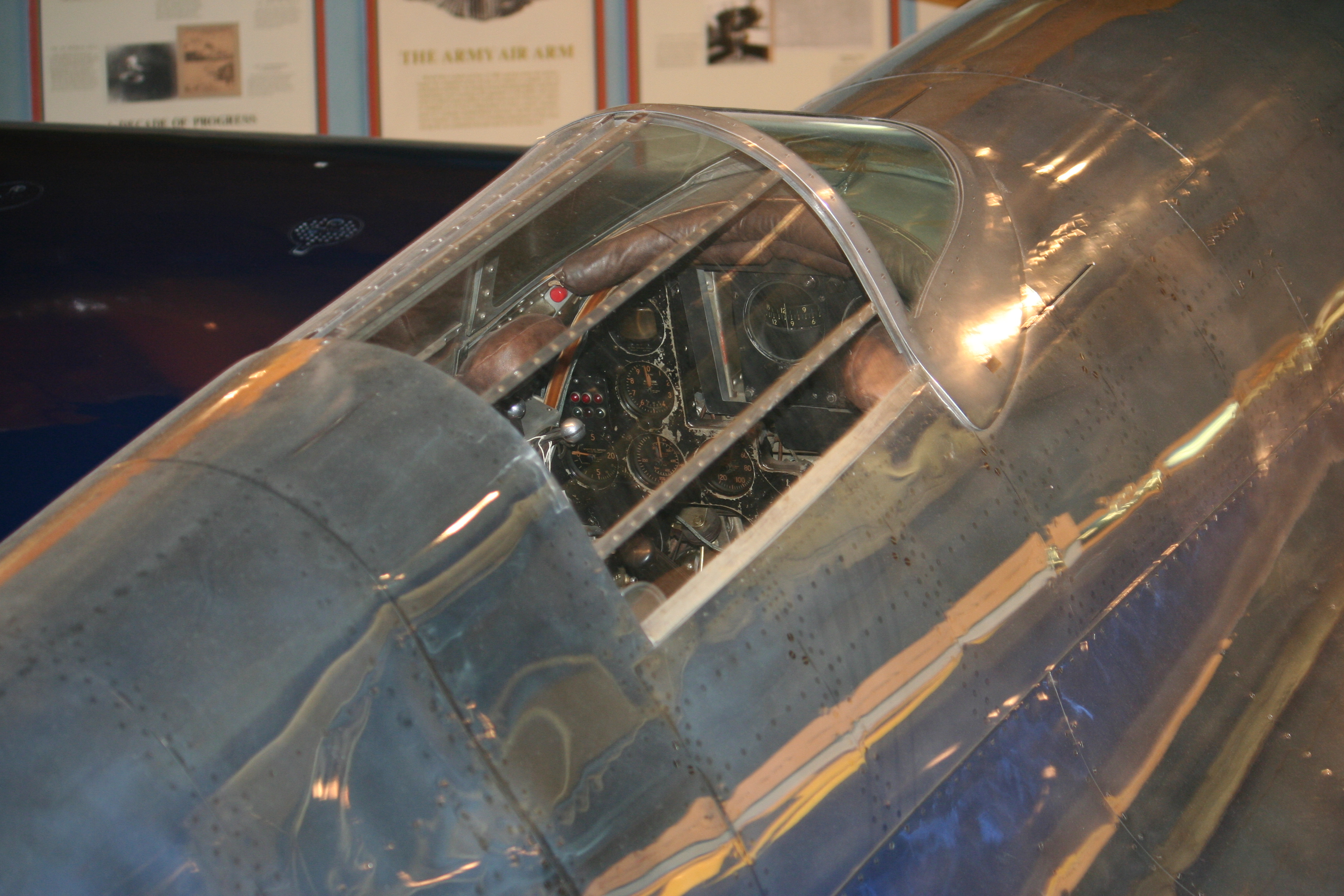
View through the canopy of the instrument panel

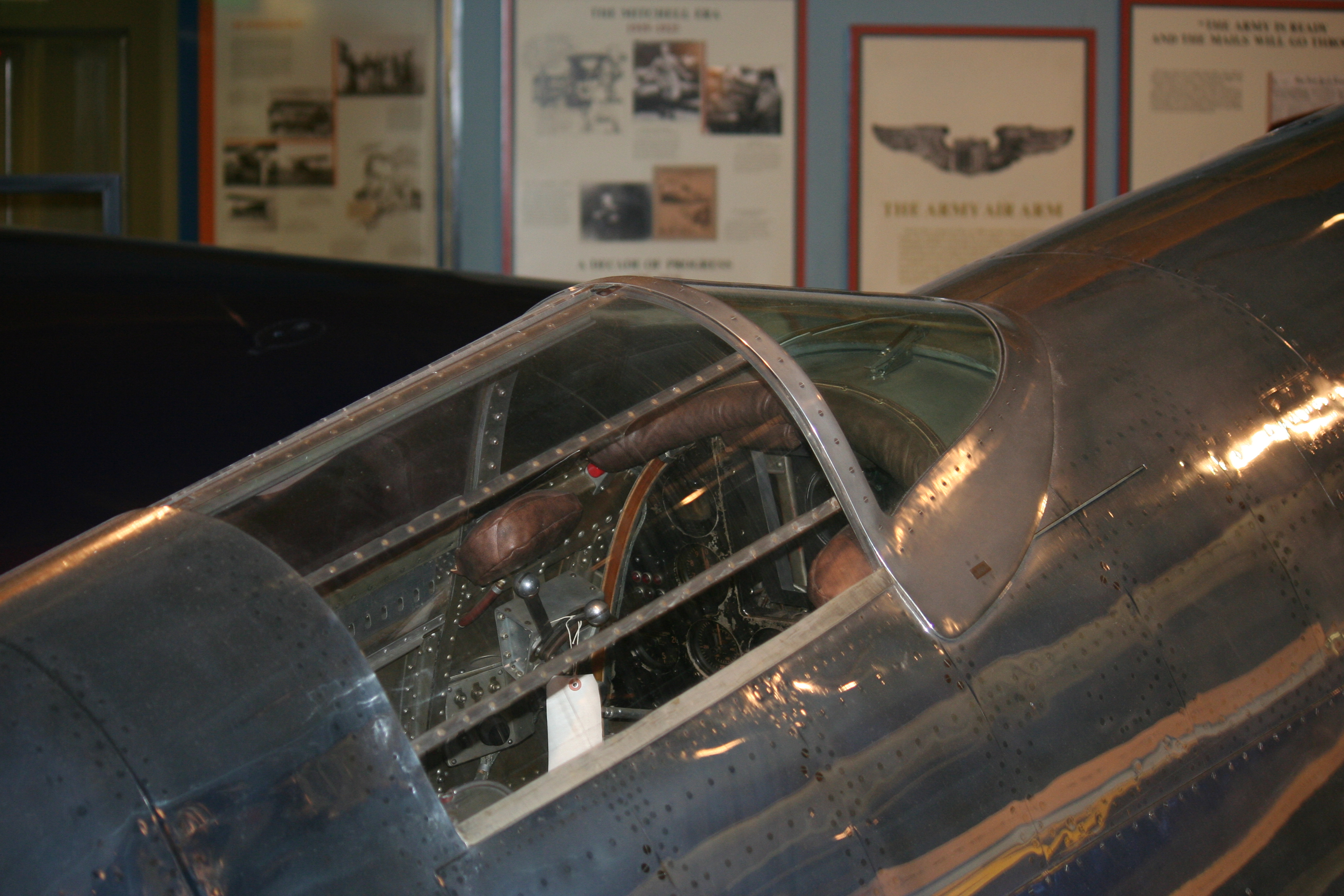
Side controls of cockpit

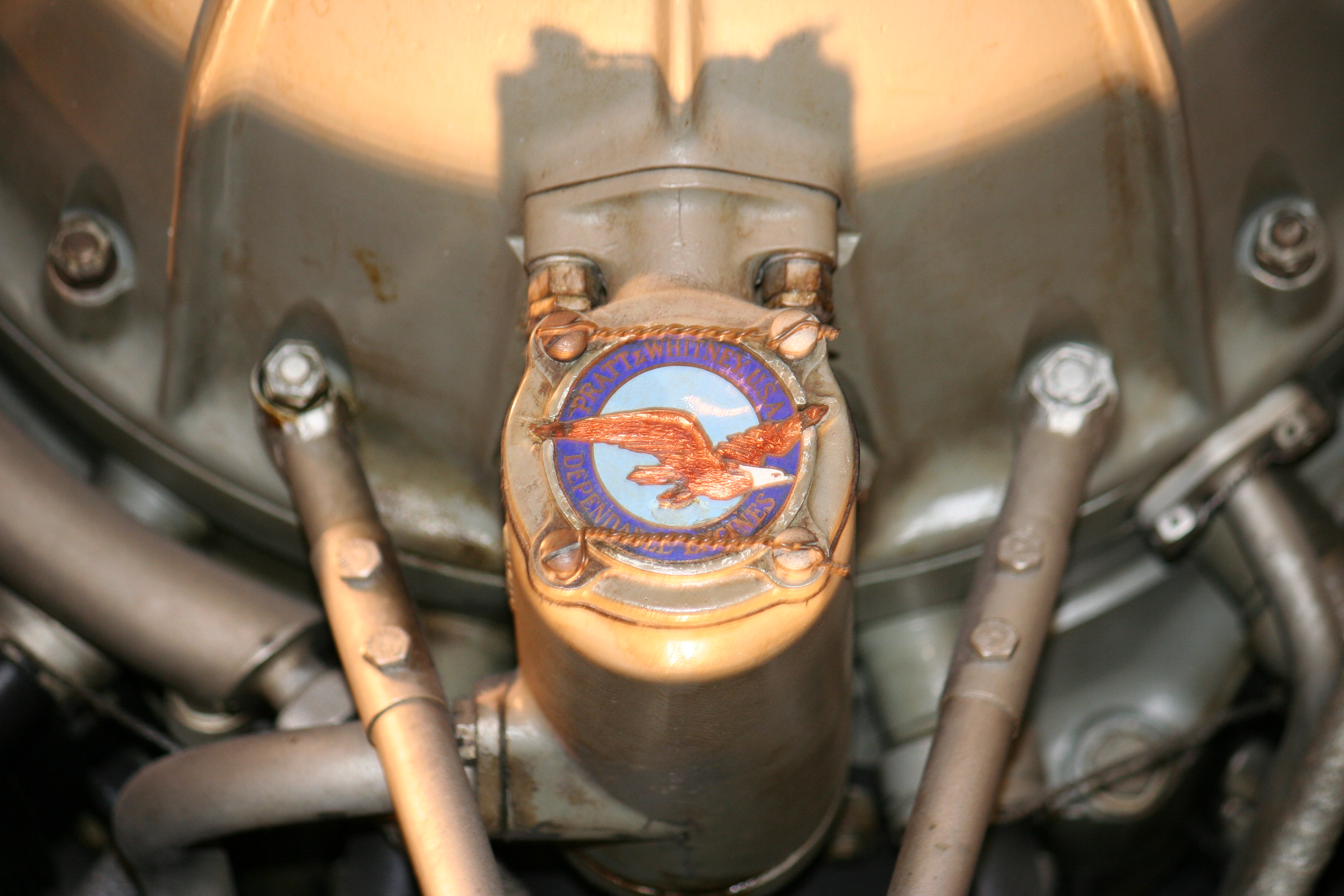
Pratt & Whitney "Dependable Engines" emblem
