= Glenn Odekirk =

American aerospace engineer

- Born: May 9, 1905; Waseca, Minnesota
- Died: January 12, 1987 (aged 81); Las Vegas, Nevada
- Spouse: Esther Tatman
- Children: 1
- Engineering career
- Discipline: Aerospace engineer
- Institutions: Oregon State University
- Employer: Hughes Aircraft
- Projects: Hughes H-1 Racer, H-4 Hercules Hughes D-2

Glenn Odekirk (Waseca, Minnesota May 9, 1905 – Las Vegas, Nevada January 12, 1987) was an American aerospace engineer who made significant contributions to the work of Hughes Aircraft.

== Biography ==
The son of Edward John and Louise (Lewis) Odekirk, Glenn, also known by his nickname 'Ode' (pronounced "OH-dee"), was an engineer who graduated from Oregon State University in 1927. During the 1930s and through World War II, Odekirk was the assistant to the businessman Howard Hughes, the president of Hughes Aircraft, with whom he had a very close professional relationship.

Odekirk met Hughes on the set of his movie Hell's Angels, and Hughes was very impressed with him. For several years, the two flew around the country together, testing the young engineer's ideas and arguing constantly over the most trivial matters of airplane construction.

In 1935, Odekirk co-designed the Hughes H-1 Racer. It set a world speed record of 352.39 miles per hour in September of that year, beating Raymond Delmotte's (of France) record of 314.32 miles per hour. The plane was revolutionary for its time and was one of the first planes in history to sport retractable landing gear, countersunk screws and flush rivets to reduce wind resistance.

Odekirk co-designed the H-4 Hercules (commonly known as the Spruce Goose) and many sources state that Odekirk was aboard when Hughes piloted the plane on its only flight on November 2, 1947.

However, according to The Ouderkerk Family Saga: 350 Years in America, Glenn Odekirk was not on the Hercules. Odekirk recalled that day: "I dropped Hughes down on the dock and he said to me, 'Odie, you don't mind not being aboard while I taxi' "...and I said, "Oh, come on." "The fellows back there (the Brewster committee) were giving him a bad time and told him the thing would never fly. So that is when I knew real well that he would take off if possible. I know darn well if it feels right, you are going to fly it. Mr. Hughes didn't want another pilot on board because someday someone would come out and say that Howard Hughes didn't fly it, so-and-so did."

== Legacy ==
In the Howard Hughes biopic The Aviator, Odekirk was portrayed by Matt Ross. The Hughes H-4 Hercules or "Spruce Goose" is now on display at the Evergreen Aviation & Space Museum in McMinnville, Oregon.
