= List of solo piano compositions by Leo Ornstein =

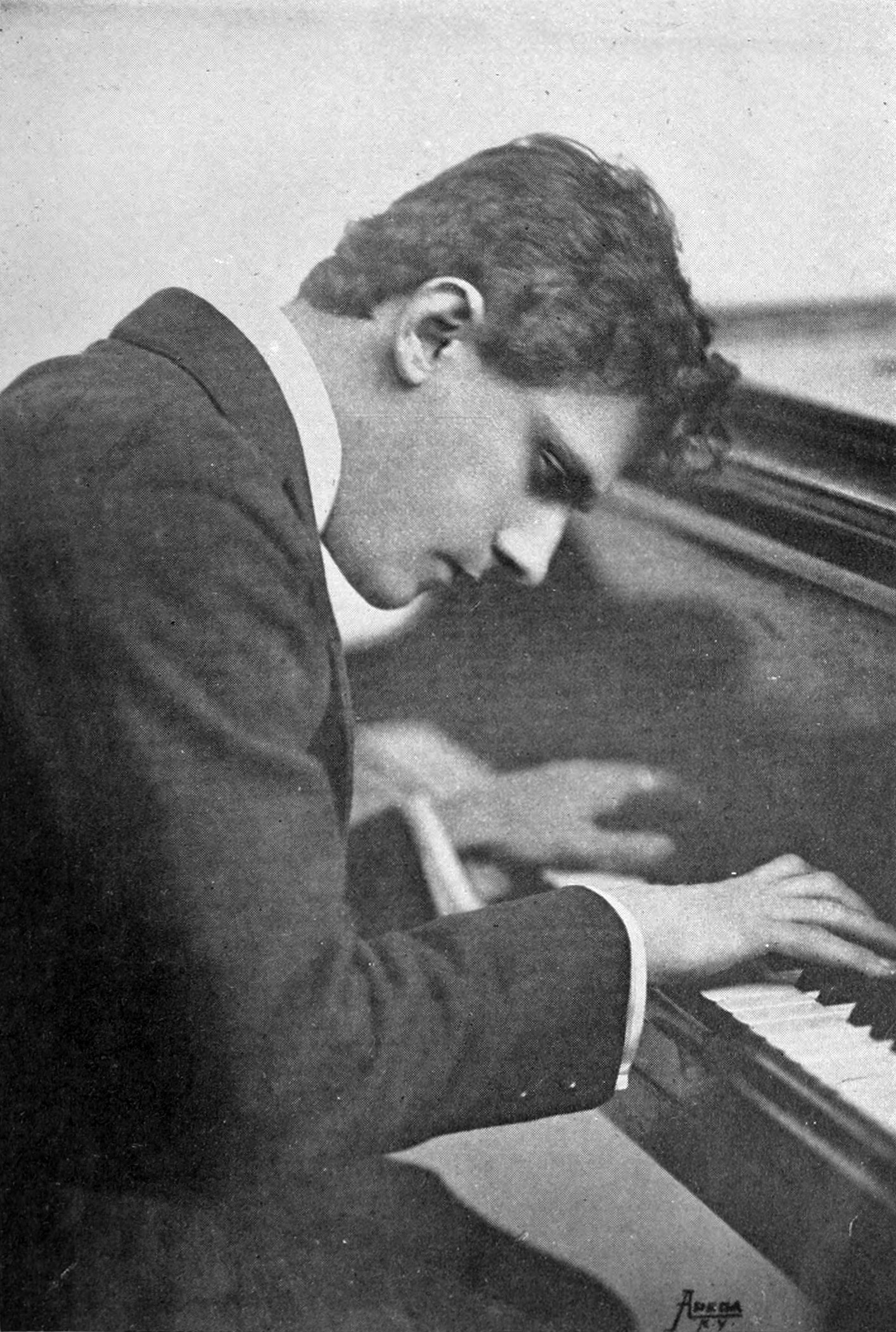
Leo Ornstein c. 1918

This is a list of solo piano pieces by Leo Ornstein.

== Major works ==
- Wild Men's Dance (a.k.a. Danse Sauvage; ca. 1913–14)
- Three Moods (ca. 1914)
- Poems of 1917 (10) (1917)
- A la Chinoise (pre-1918)
- Suicide in an Airplane (ca. 1918–19; frequently misdated 1913)
- Impressions of the Thames (a.k.a. Impressions de la Tamise; 1920)
- Arabesques (9) (1921)
- Piano Sonata No. 4 (1924)
- Piano Sonata No. 5, "Biography" (1974)
- Piano Sonata No. 6 (1981)
- Piano Sonata No. 7 (1988)
- Piano Sonata No. 8 (1990)

== Organized list ==
- S001 – Nocturne
- S002 – At Twilight
- S003 – Piano Pieces
- S004 – Nocturne No. 2
- S005 – Three Moods
- S006 – Suicide in an Airplane
- S007a – An Allegory
- S008 – Barcarolle
- S009 – 6 Lyric Fancies

== Early published (050-099) ==
- S050 – Serenade
- S051 – Scherzino
- S052 – Dwarf Suite
- S053 – Impressions of the Thames
- S054 – Wild Men's Dance
- S055 – Cossack Impressions
- S056 – Impressions of Notre Dame
- S057 – Three Preludes
- S058 – Suite Russe
- S059 – A la Mexicana
- S060 – A la Chinoise
- S061a – Poems of 1917
- S062 – Arabesques
- S063 – In the Country
- S064 – Two Lyric Pieces
- S065 – Musings of a Piano
- S066 – Memories from Childhood
- S067 – Six Water Colors
- S068 – Piano Sketch Books
- S069 – Prelude Tragique
- S070 – Pygmy Suite
- S071a – Moment Musical (after Schubert)
- S072 – Nine Miniatures
- S073 – Piano Piece
- S074 – Piano Piece
- S075 – Piano Piece

== Named and dated (100–149) ==
- S100 – Bagatelle
- S101 – Tarantelle Diabolique
- S102a – A Long Remembered Sorrow
- S103 – Mindy's Piece
- S104b – Evening's Sorrow
- S105 – Some New York Scenes
- S106 – A Morning in the Woods
- S107 – Burlesca (A Satire)
- S108 – Ballade
- S109 – Valse Diabolique
- S110 – A Dream Almost Forgotten
- S111a – Three Tales
- S114 – Just a Fun Piece
- S115 – A Small Carnival
- S116 – Solitude
- S117 – The Recruit and the Bugler
- S118 – An Autumnal Fantasy
- S119 – An Autumn Improvisation
- S120 – Barbaro: A Pantomime

== Named and undated (150–199) ==
- S150 – A Reverie
- S151 – A Chromatic Dance
- S152 – The Deserted Garden
- S153 – Nocturne No. I
- S154 – To A Grecian Urn
- S155 – Tarantelle
- S156 – A Moment of Retrospect

== Metaphors (200–299) ==
- S200a – Sixteen Metaphors

== Impromptus (300–319) ==
- S300a – Four Impromptus

== Intermezzos (320–329) ==
- S320a – Four Intermezzos

== Journal pieces (330–349) ==
- S330 – Six Journal Pieces

== Legends (350–359) ==
S350 – Four Legends

== Sonatas (360–379) ==
- S360 – Sonata No. 4
- S361 – Sonata No. 5 (Biography)
- S362 – Sonata No. 6
- S363 – Sonata No. 7
- S364a – Sonata No. 8

== Vignettes (380–399) ==
- S380 – Nine Vignettes

== Waltzes (400–439) ==
- S400 – Seventeen Waltzes

== Fantasy Pieces (440–459) ==
- S440a – Three Fantasy Pieces

== Four Hand (including the 2-piano version of the piano concerto) (550–559) ==
- S550 – Piece Pour Piano
- S551 – Valse Buffon
- S552 – Seeing Russia with Teacher
- S553 – Piano Concerto – 2-Piano version
