= Tone cluster =

Dense musical chord

Example of piano tone clusters. The clusters in the upper staff—C♯ D♯ F♯ G♯—are four successive black keys. The last two bars, played with overlapping hands, are a denser cluster.

A tone cluster is a musical chord comprising at least three adjacent tones in a scale. Prototypical tone clusters are based on the chromatic scale and are separated by semitones. For instance, three adjacent piano keys (such as C, C♯, and D) struck simultaneously produce a tone cluster. Variants of the tone cluster include chords comprising adjacent tones separated diatonically, pentatonically, or microtonally. On the piano, such clusters often involve the simultaneous striking of neighboring white or black keys.

The early years of the twentieth century saw tone clusters elevated to central roles in pioneering works by ragtime artists Jelly Roll Morton and Scott Joplin. In the 1910s, two classical avant-gardists, composer-pianists Leo Ornstein and Henry Cowell, were recognized as making the first extensive explorations of the tone cluster. During the same period, Charles Ives employed them in several compositions that were not publicly performed until the late 1920s or 1930s, as did Béla Bartók in the latter decade. Since the mid-20th century, they have prominently featured in the work of composers such as Lou Harrison, Giacinto Scelsi, Alfred Schnittke and Karlheinz Stockhausen, and later Eric Whitacre. Tone clusters also play a significant role in the work of free jazz musicians such as Cecil Taylor, Matthew Shipp, and Kevin Kastning.

In most Western music, tone clusters tend to be heard as dissonant. Clusters may be performed with almost any individual instrument on which three or more notes can be played simultaneously, as well as by most groups of instruments or voices. Keyboard instruments are particularly suited to the performance of tone clusters because it is relatively easy to play multiple notes in unison on them.

== Music theory and classification ==
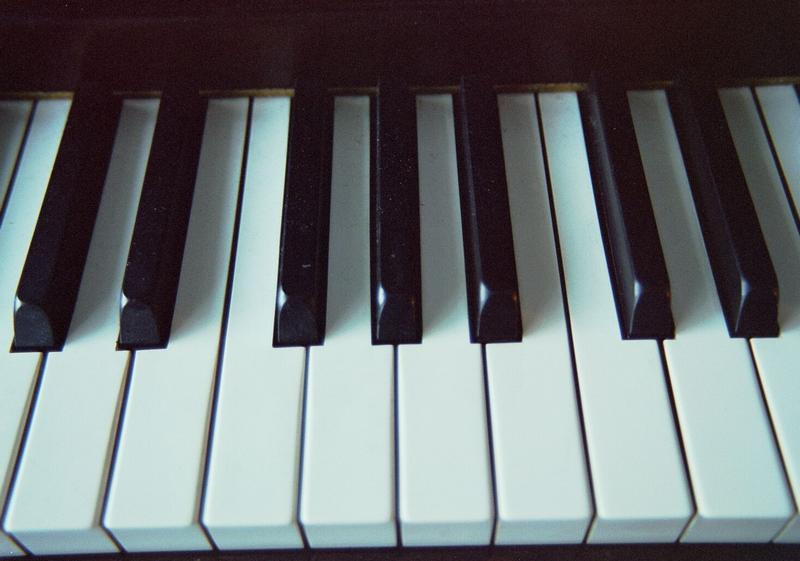
The modern keyboard is designed for playing a diatonic scale on the white keys and a pentatonic scale on the black keys. Chromatic scales involve both. Three immediately adjacent keys produce a basic chromatic tone cluster.

Prototypical tone clusters are chords of three or more adjacent notes on a chromatic scale, that is, three or more adjacent pitches each separated by only a semitone. Three-note stacks based on diatonic and pentatonic scales are also, strictly speaking, tone clusters. However, these stacks involve intervals between notes greater than the half-tone gaps of the chromatic kind. This can readily be seen on a keyboard, where the pitch of each key is separated from the next by one semitone (visualizing the black keys as extending to the edge of the keyboard): Diatonic scales—conventionally played on the white keys—contain only two semitone intervals; the rest are full tones. In Western musical traditions, pentatonic scales—conventionally played on the black keys—are built entirely from intervals larger than a semitone. Commentators thus tend to identify diatonic and pentatonic stacks as "tone clusters" only when they consist of four or more successive notes in the scale. In standard Western classical music practice, all tone clusters are classifiable as secundal chords—that is, they are constructed from minor seconds (intervals of one semitone), major seconds (intervals of two semitones), or, in the case of certain pentatonic clusters, augmented seconds (intervals of three semitones). Stacks of adjacent microtonal pitches also constitute tone clusters.

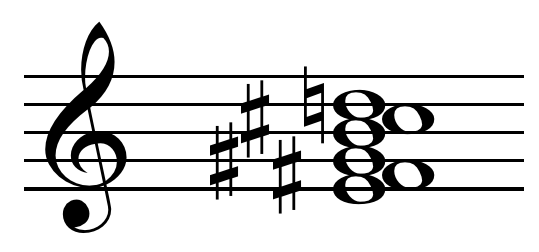
A thirteenth chord collapsed into one octave results in a dissonant tone cluster

In tone clusters, the notes are sounded fully and in unison, distinguishing them from ornamented figures involving acciaccaturas and the like. Their effect also tends to be different: where ornamentation is used to draw attention to the harmony or the relationship between harmony and melody, tone clusters are for the most part employed as independent sounds. While, by definition, the notes that form a cluster must sound at the same time, there is no requirement that they must all begin sounding at the same moment. For example, in R. Murray Schafer's choral Epitaph for Moonlight (1968), a tone cluster is constructed by dividing each choir section (soprano/alto/tenor/bass) into four parts. Each of the sixteen parts enters separately, humming a note one semitone lower than the note hummed by the previous part, until all sixteen are contributing to the cluster.

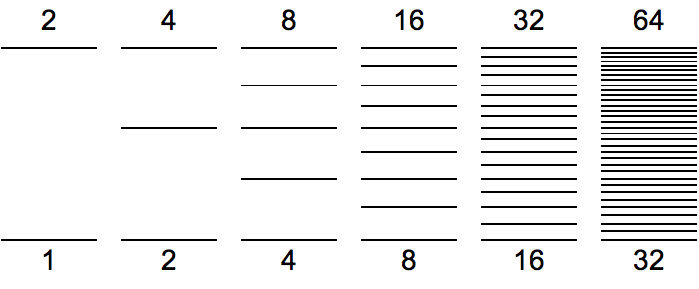
By the fourth octave of the harmonic series, successive harmonics form increasingly small seconds the fifth octave of harmonics (16–32)

Tone clusters have generally been thought of as dissonant musical textures, and even defined as such. As noted by Alan Belkin, however, instrumental timbre can have a significant impact on their effect: "Clusters are quite aggressive on the organ, but soften enormously when played by strings (possibly because slight, continuous fluctuations of pitch in the latter provide some inner mobility)." In his first published work on the topic, Henry Cowell observed that a tone cluster is "more pleasing" and "acceptable to the ear if its outer limits form a consonant interval." Cowell explains, "the natural spacing of so-called dissonances is as seconds, as in the overtone series, rather than sevenths and ninths....Groups spaced in seconds may be made to sound euphonious, particularly if played in conjunction with fundamental chord notes taken from lower in the same overtone series. Blends them together and explains them to the ear." Tone clusters have also been considered noise. As Mauricio Kagel says, "clusters have generally been used as a kind of anti-harmony, as a transition between sound and noise." Tone clusters thus also lend themselves to use in a percussive manner. Historically, they were sometimes discussed with a hint of disdain. One 1969 textbook defines the tone cluster as "an extra-harmonic clump of notes".

== Notation and execution ==
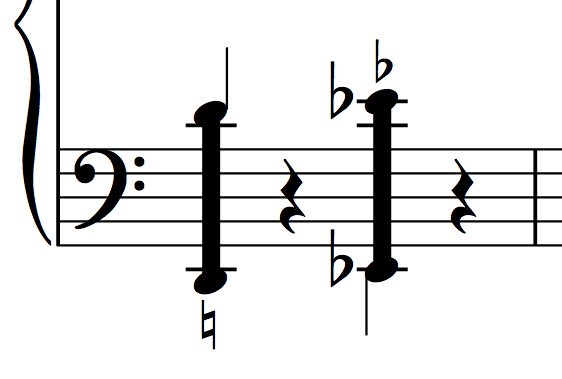
Example of Henry Cowell's notation of tone clusters for piano

In his 1917 piece The Tides of Manaunaun, Cowell introduced a new notation for tone clusters on the piano and other keyboard instruments. In this notation, only the top and bottom notes of a cluster, connected by a single line or a pair of lines, are represented. This developed into the solid-bar style seen in the image on the right. Here, the first chord—stretching two octaves from D_{2} to D_{4}—is a diatonic (so-called white-note) cluster, indicated by the natural sign below the staff. The second is a pentatonic (so-called black-note) cluster, indicated by the flat sign; a sharp sign would be required if the notes showing the limit of the cluster were spelled as sharps. A chromatic cluster—black and white keys together—is shown in this method by a solid bar with no sign at all.

In scoring the large, dense clusters of the solo organ work Volumina in the early 1960s, György Ligeti, using graphical notation, blocked in whole sections of the keyboard.

The performance of keyboard tone clusters is widely considered an "extended technique"—large clusters require unusual playing methods often involving the fist, the flat of the hand, or the forearm. Thelonious Monk and Karlheinz Stockhausen each performed clusters with their elbows; Stockhausen developed a method for playing cluster glissandi with special gloves. Don Pullen would play moving clusters by rolling the backs of his hands over the keyboard. Boards of various dimension are sometimes employed, as in the Concord Sonata (c. 1904–19) of Charles Ives; they can be weighted down to execute clusters of long duration.

Several of Lou Harrison's scores call for the use of an "octave bar", crafted to facilitate high-speed keyboard cluster performance. Designed by Harrison with his partner William Colvig, the octave bar is

a flat wooden device approximately two inches high with a grip on top and sponge rubber on the bottom, with which the player strikes the keys. Its length spans an octave on a grand piano. The sponge rubber bottom is sculpted so that its ends are slightly lower than its center, making the outer tones of the octave sound with greater force than the intermediary pitches. The pianist can thus rush headlong through fearfully rapid passages, precisely spanning an octave at each blow.

== Use in Western music ==
=== Before the 1900s ===
The earliest example of tone clusters in a Western music composition thus far identified is in the Allegro movement of Heinrich Biber's Battalia à 10 (1673) for string ensemble, which calls for several diatonic clusters. An orchestral diatonic cluster, containing all the notes of the harmonic minor scale, occurs also in the representation of chaos in the opening of Jean-Féry Rebel's 1737–38 ballet Les Élémens.

Rebel, Les Élemens, opening

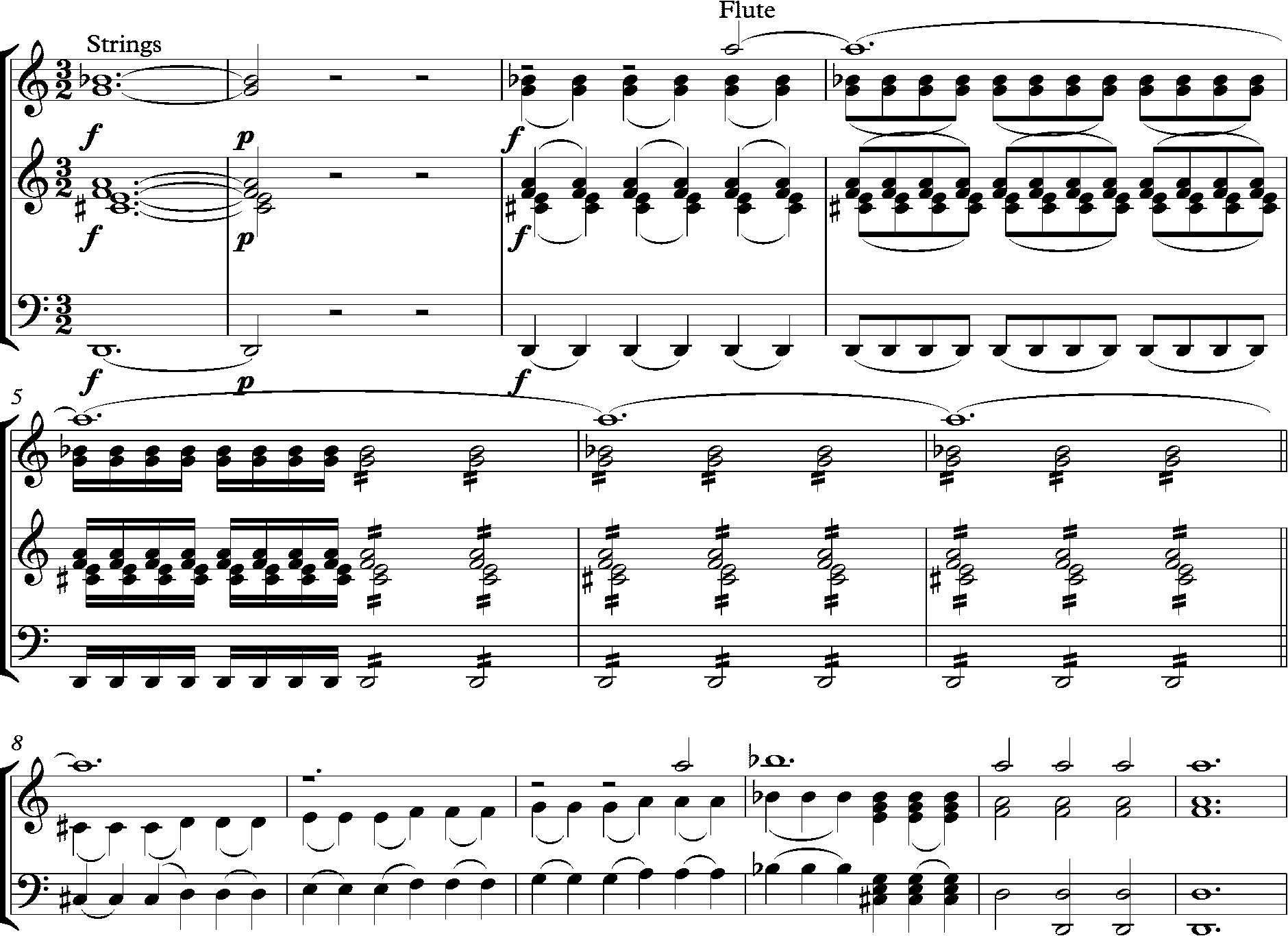
Rebel, Les Élemens, opening

From the next century-and-a-half, a few more examples have been identified, mostly no more than a fleeting instance of the form, for example in the opening of J.S. Bach's Cantata O Ewigkeit, du Donnerwort, BWV 60

Bach, ̊O ewigkeit du donnerwort' BWV60 opening

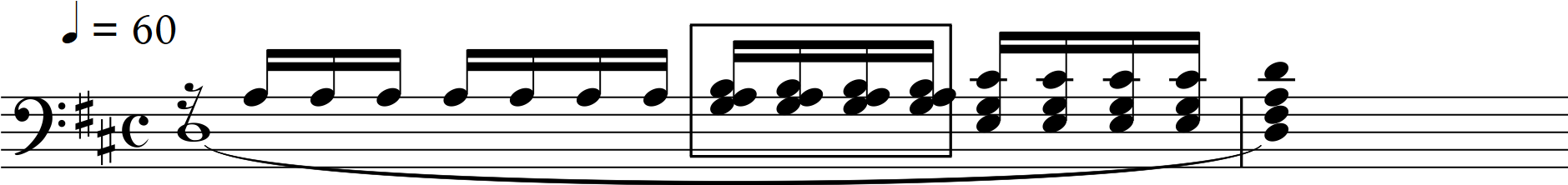
Bach, ̊O ewigkeit du donnerwort' BWV 60

or in the concluding two bars of the "Loure" from the same composer's French Suite No. 5, BWV 816:

Loure from Bach's French Suite No. 5, concluding bars

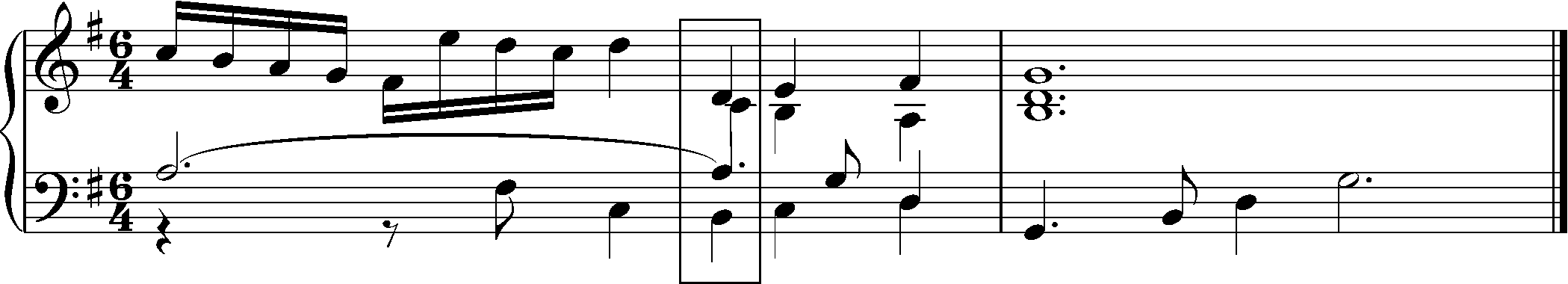
Loure from Bach, French Suite No. 5, concluding bars

or the collisions that result from the interaction of multiple lines "locked together in suspensions" in Bach's The Musical Offering:

Ricercar a 6 from The Musical Offering bars 29–31

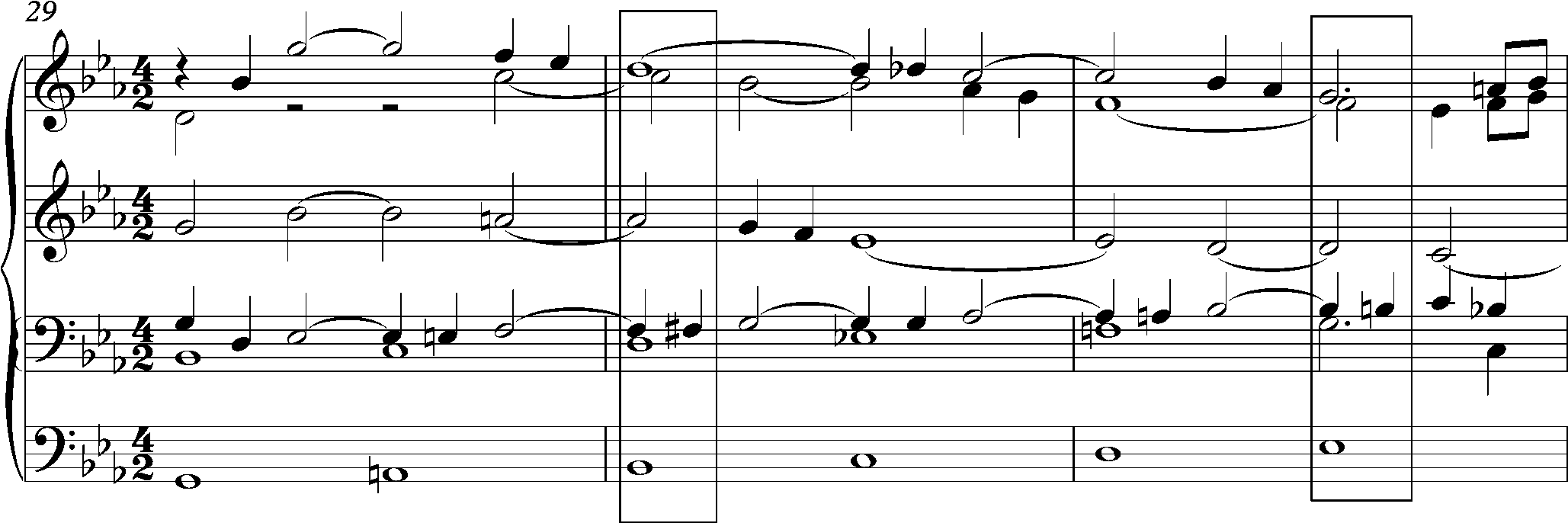
J. S. Bach, Ricercar a 6 from The Musical Offering bars 29–31

In the keyboard sonatas of Domenico Scarlatti (1685–1757), we find a more daring and idiosyncratic use of tone clusters. In the following passage from the late 1740s, Scarlatti builds the dissonances over several bars:

Scarlatti Keyboard Sonata K119 bars 143–168

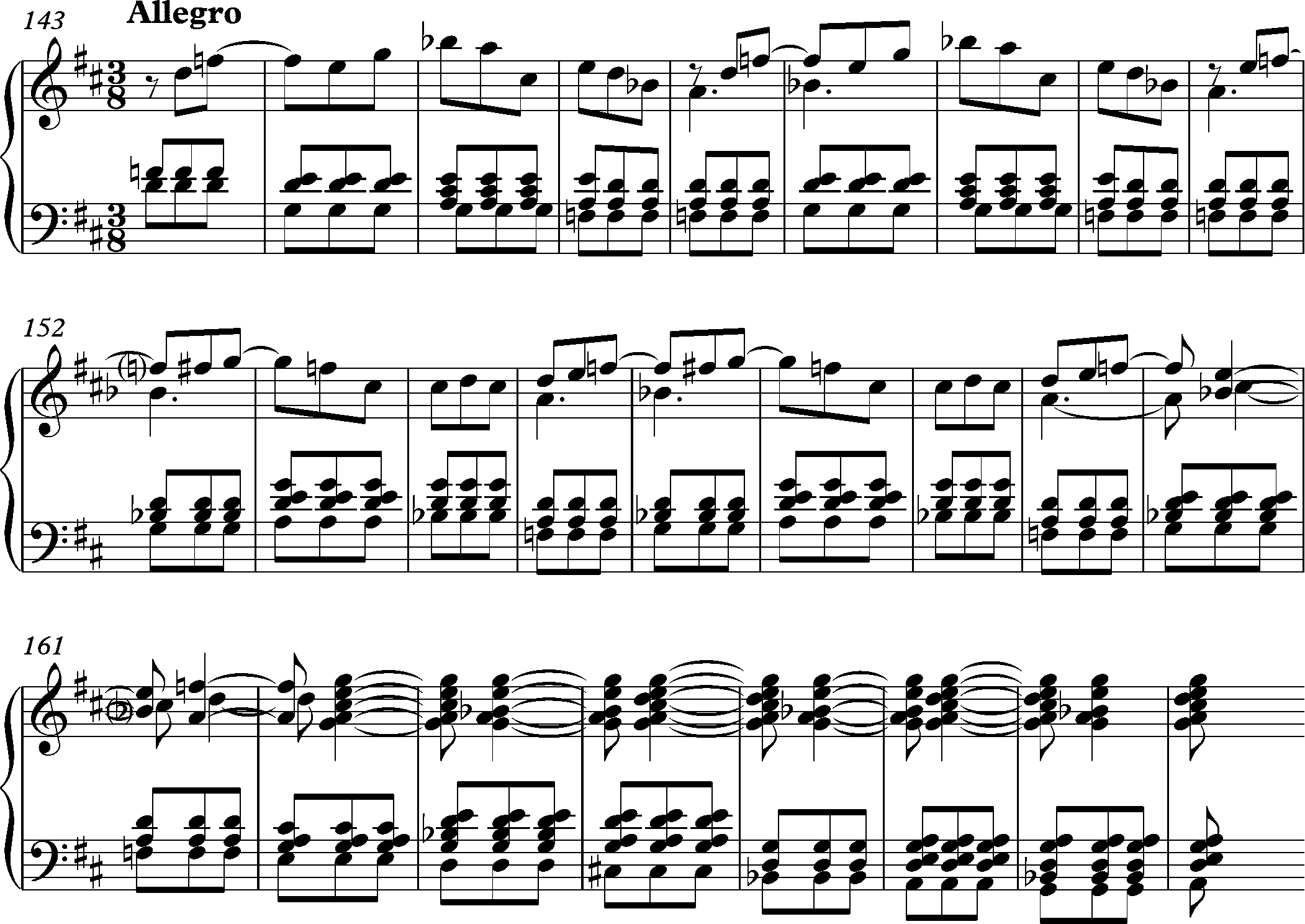
Scarlatti Keyboard Sonata K119 bars 143–168

Ralph Kirkpatrick says that these chords "are not clusters in the sense that they are arbitrary blobs of dissonance, nor are they necessarily haphazard fillings up of diatonic intervals or simultaneous soundings of neighboring tones; they are logical expressions of Scarlatti's harmonic language and organic manifestations of his tonal structure." Frederick Neumann describes Sonata K175 (1750s) as "full of Scarlatti's famous tone clusters". During this era, as well, several French programmatic compositions for the harpsichord or piano represent cannon fire with clusters: works by François Dandrieu (Les Caractères de la guerre, 1724), Michel Corrette (La Victoire d'un combat naval, remportée par une frégate contre plusieurs corsaires réunis, 1780), Claude-Bénigne Balbastre (March des Marseillois, 1793), Pierre Antoine César (La Battaille de Gemmap, ou la prise de Mons, c. 1794), Bernard Viguerie (La Bataille de Maringo, pièce militaire et hitorique, for piano trio, 1800), and Jacques-Marie Beauvarlet-Charpentier (Battaille d'Austerlitz, 1805).

A dramatic use of a "virtual" tone cluster can be found in Franz Schubert's song "Erlkönig" (1815–21). Here, a terrified child calls out to his father when he sees an apparition of the sinister Erl King. The dissonant voicing of the dominant minor ninth chord used here (C^{7♭9}) is particularly effective in heightening the drama and sense of threat.

From Schubert's "Erlkönig"

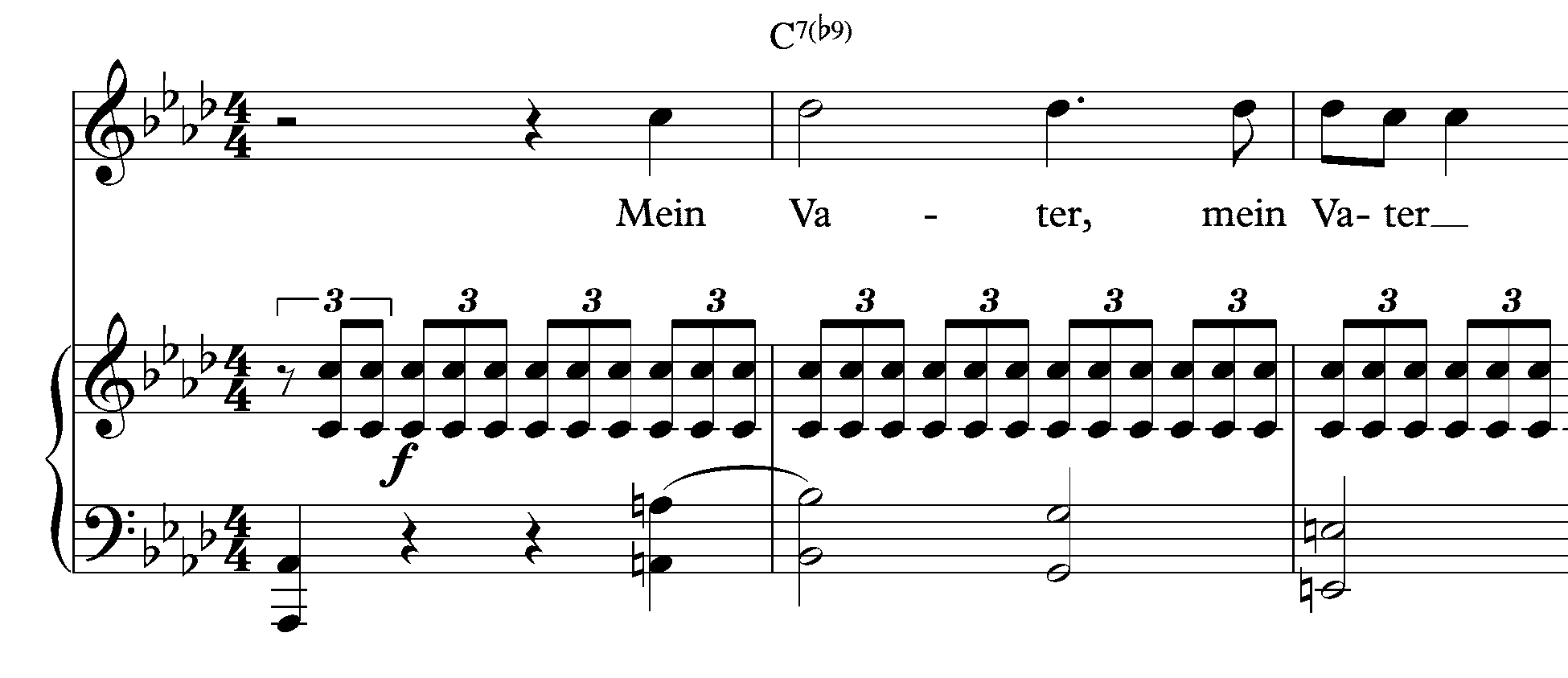
Extract from Schubert's "Erlkönig"

Writing about this passage, Richard Taruskin remarked on the "unprecedented ... level of dissonance at the boy's outcries. ... The voice has the ninth, pitched above, and the left hand has the seventh, pitched below. The result is a virtual 'tone cluster' ... the harmonic logic of these progressions, within the rules of composition Schubert was taught, can certainly be demonstrated. That logic, however, is not what appeals so strongly to the listener's imagination; rather it is the calculated impression (or illusion) of wild abandon."

The concluding Arietta from Beethoven’s last Piano Sonata No. 32, Op. 111 features a passage which, according to Martin Cooper “gives a momentary touch of blurredness by the repeated cluster of fourths.”

Beethoven arietta from Piano Sonata 32, bars 96–97

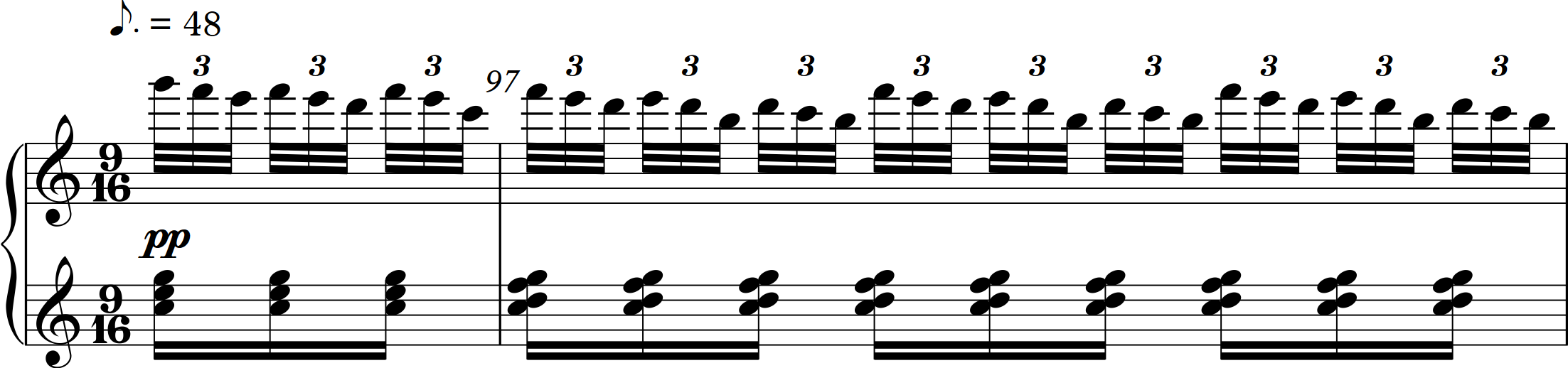
Beethoven arietta from Piano Sonata 32, bars 96–97

The next known compositions after Charpentier's to feature tone clusters are by Charles-Valentin Alkan. One is Une fusée (A Rocket) Op. 55, published in 1859, where the last page calls for a chord in the low register, pounded five times in a row, reading G–A–B♭–C♯–D–E–F–G, in which each of the three seconds on white keys are to be taken by a single finger. The other is "Les Diablotins" (The Imps), a miniature from the set of 49 Esquisses (sketches) for solo piano, published in 1861.

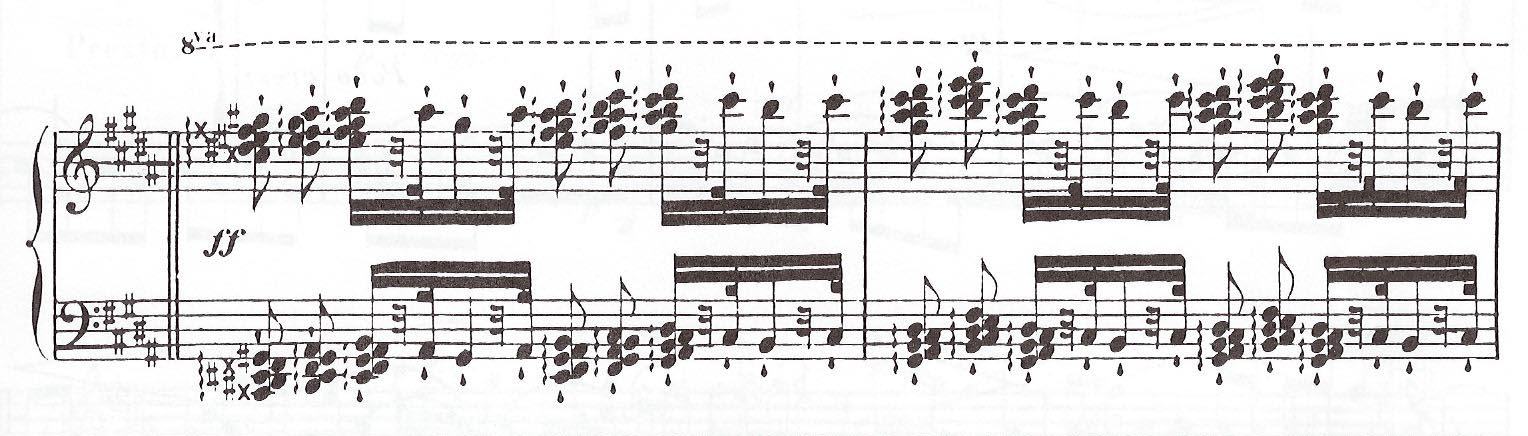
Extract from Alkan's Les diablotins, Op. 63, no. 45, featuring tone clusters

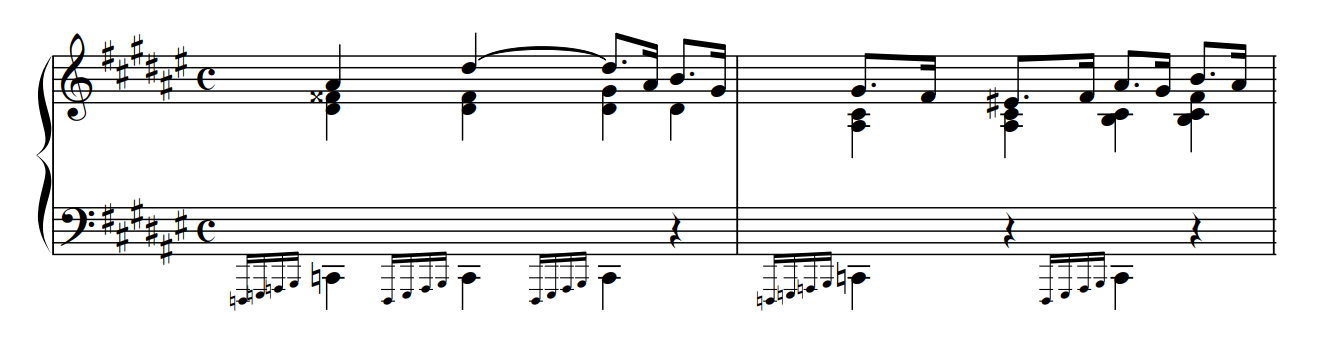
Measures 14 and 15 of the F♯ major section of L.M. Gottschalk's Grande Fantaisie Triomphale sur L'hymne National Brésilien. The third beat of measure 15 has a chord containing A♯, B, C, and C♯.

There is also the solo piano piece Battle of Manassas, written in 1861 by "Blind Tom" Bethune and published in 1866. The score instructs the pianist to represent cannon fire at various points by striking "with the flat of the hand, as many notes as possible, and with as much force as possible, at the bass of the piano." This rolled G–A–B–C cluster later appears in Louis Moreau Gottschalk's Grande Fantaisie Triomphale sur L'hymne National Brésilien, published in 1869. The section features a stark contrast between the C major cluster against the key of F♯ Major. In 1887, Giuseppe Verdi became the first notable composer in the Western tradition to write an unmistakable chromatic cluster: the storm music with which Otello opens includes an organ cluster (C, C♯, D) that also has the longest notated duration of any scored musical texture known. The choral finale of Gustav Mahler's Symphony No. 2 features a tone cluster of great poignancy arising naturally out of voice leading to the words "wird, der dich rief, dir geben":

Mahler Symphony 2 finale Fig 32, bars 4–10

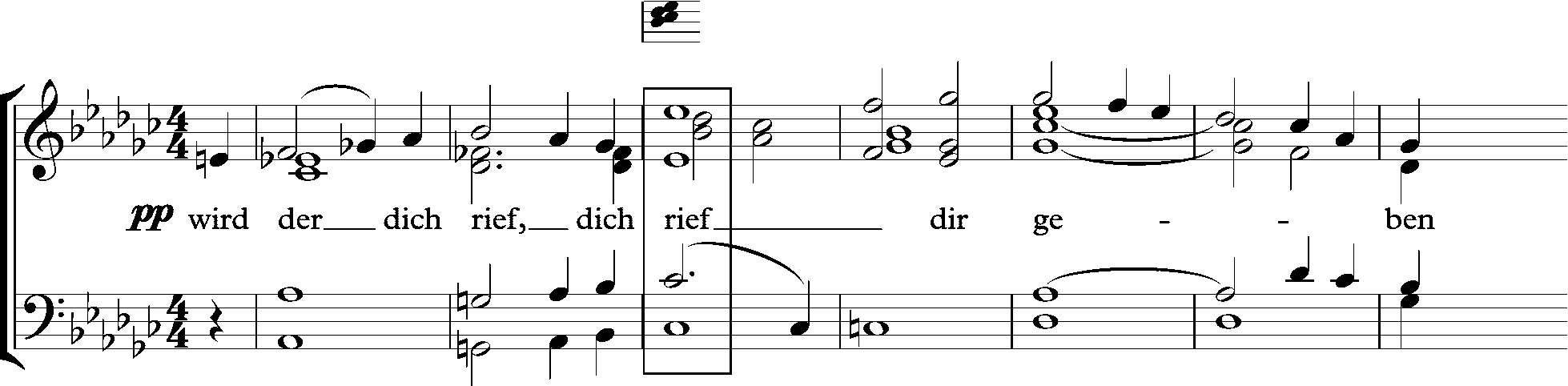
Mahler Symphony 2 finale Fig 32, bars 4–10

Still, it was not before the second decade of the twentieth century that tone clusters assumed a recognized place in Western classical music practice.

=== In classical music of the early 1900s ===
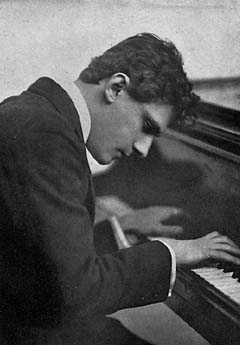
Leo Ornstein was the first composer to be widely known for using tone clusters—though the term itself was not yet used to describe the radical aspect of his work.

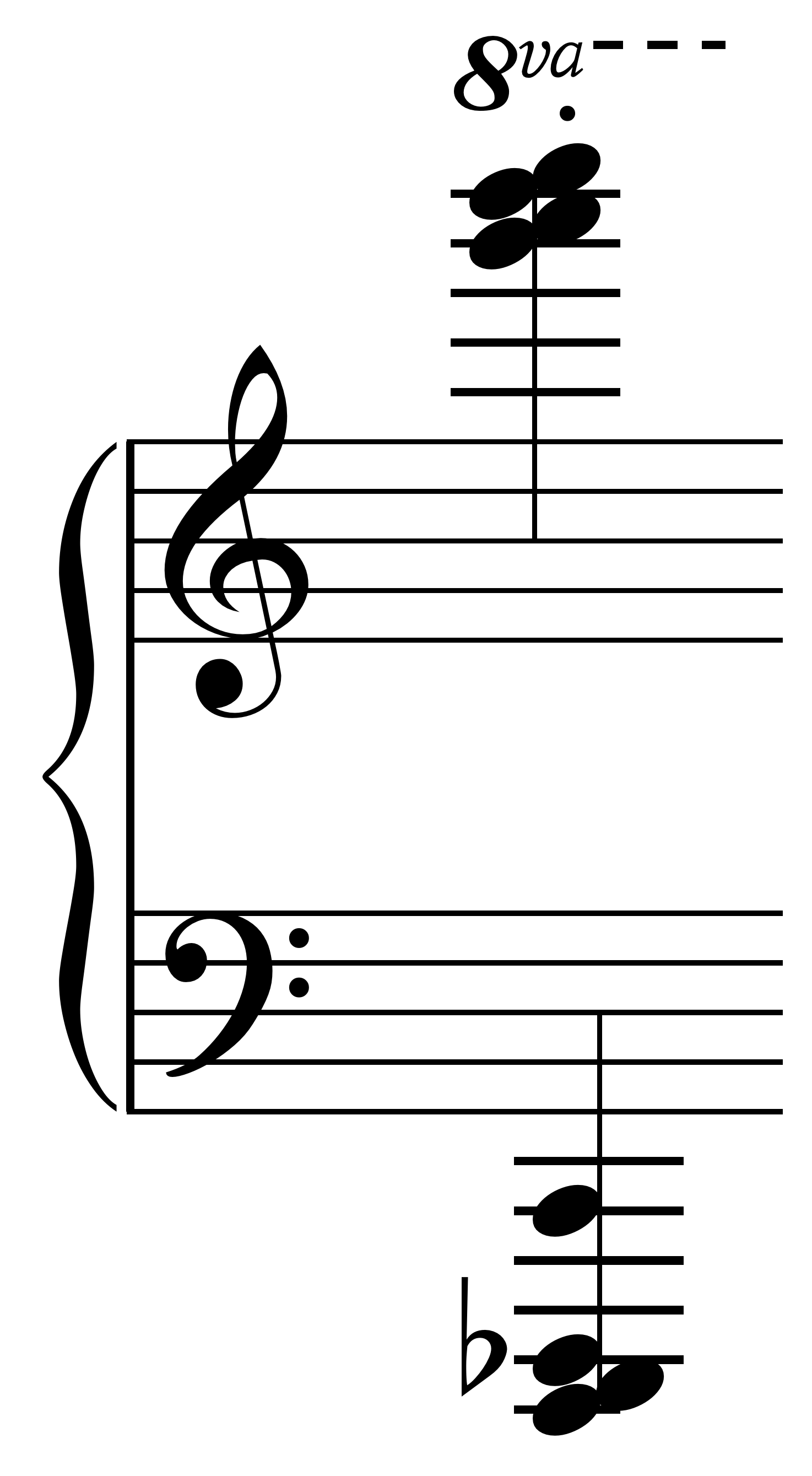
Final chord of Tintamarre

"Around 1910," Harold C. Schonberg writes, "Percy Grainger was causing a stir by the near–tone clusters in such works as his Gumsuckers March." In 1911, what appears to be the first published classical composition to thoroughly integrate true tone clusters was issued: Tintamarre (The Clangor of Bells), by Canadian composer J. Humfrey Anger (1862–1913). (Note: For a discussion of the piece, see Keillor, Elaine (2004-05-10). "Writing for a Market—Canadian Musical Composition Before the First World War". Library and Archives Canada/Bibliothèque et Archives Canada. The score of Tintamarre and its publication record are also available online via Library and Archives Canada/Bibliothèque et Archives Canada. See also Keillor (2000) and "Anger, Humfrey". Encyclopedia of Music in Canada. The Canadian Encyclopedia. The early performance history of Tintamarre has not been established.)

Within a few years, the radical composer-pianist Leo Ornstein became one of the most famous figures in classical music on both sides of the Atlantic for his performances of cutting-edge work. In 1914, Ornstein debuted several of his own solo piano compositions: Wild Men's Dance (aka Danse Sauvage; c. 1913–14), Impressions of the Thames (c. 1913–14), and Impressions of Notre Dame (c. 1913–14) were the first works to explore the tone cluster in depth ever heard by a substantial audience. Wild Men's Dance, in particular, was constructed almost entirely out of clusters. (Note: See Broyles (2004), p. 78, for premiere of these works. The piano music for Ornstein's Sonata for Violin and Piano, Op. 31 (1915; not 1913 as is often erroneously given), also employs tone clusters, though not to the extent of Wild Men's Dance. Three Moods (c. 1914) for solo piano has been said to contain clusters (Pollack [2000], p. 44); perusal online of the published score, however, does not reveal any. Ornstein's solo piano piece Suicide in an Airplane (n.d.), which makes incontrovertible use of tone clusters in one extended passage, is often erroneously dated "1913" or "c. 1913"; in fact, it is undated and there is no record of its existence before 1919 (Anderson [2002]).) In 1918, critic Charles L. Buchanan described Ornstein's innovation: "[He] gives us masses of shrill, hard dissonances, chords consisting of anywhere from eight to a dozen notes made up of half tones heaped one upon another."

Clusters were also beginning to appear in more pieces by European composers. Isaac Albéniz's use of them in Iberia (1905–1908) may have influenced Gabriel Fauré's subsequent piano writing. Joseph Horowitz has suggested that the "dissonant star clusters" in its third and fourth books were particularly compelling to Olivier Messiaen, who called Iberia "the wonder of the piano". The Thomas de Hartmann score for Wassily Kandinsky's stage show The Yellow Sound (1909) employs a chromatic cluster at two climactic points. Alban Berg's Four Pieces for clarinet and piano (1913) calls for clusters along with other avant-garde keyboard techniques. Claude Debussy's piano prelude "La Cathédrale Engloutie" makes powerful use of clusters to evoke the sound of "pealing bells – with so many added major seconds one would call this pan-diatonic harmony".

Debussy "La cathédrale engloutie", bars 22–28

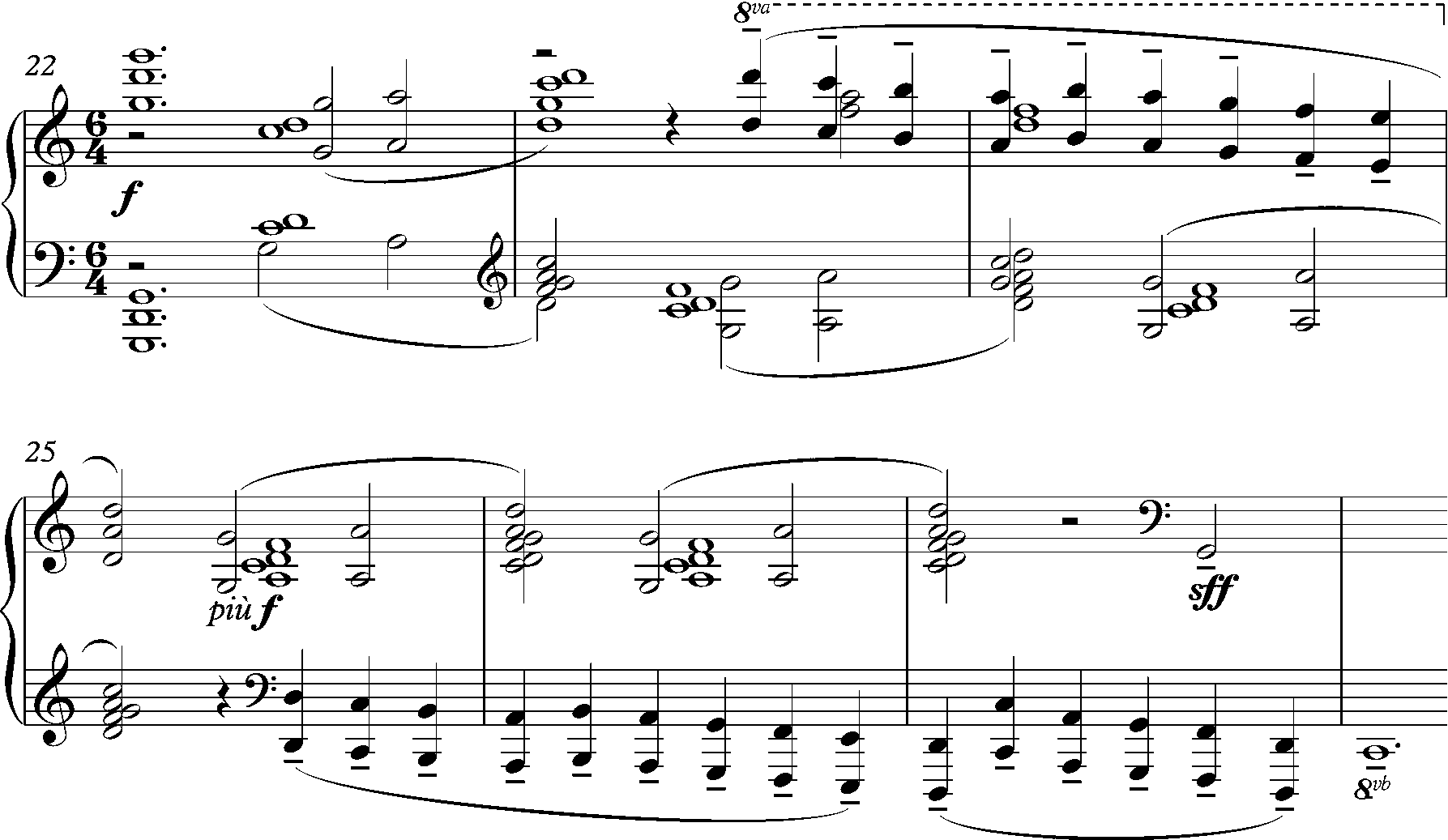
Debussy "La cathédrale engloutie", bars 22–28

In his 1913 piano prelude "General Lavine – Excentric", one of the first pieces to be influenced by black American popular styles (the Cakewalk) Debussy features abrasive tone clusters at the conclusion of the following passage:

Debussy, "General Lavine" – excentric, bars 11–19

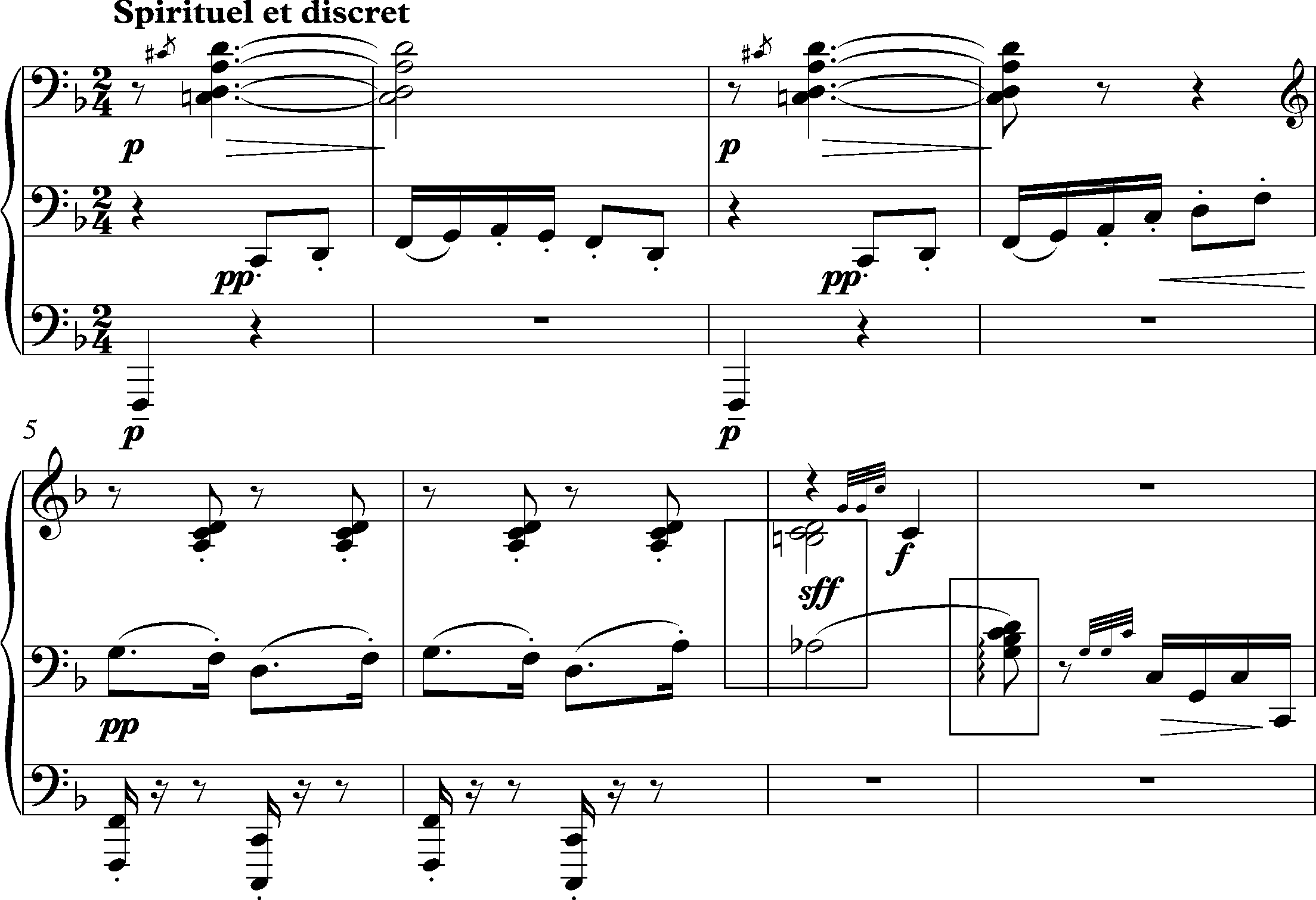
Debussy, "General Lavine" – excentric, bars 11–18

In his 1915 arrangement for solo piano of his Six Epigraphes Antiques (1914), originally a set of piano duets, Debussy includes tone clusters in the fifth piece, Pour l'Egyptienne.

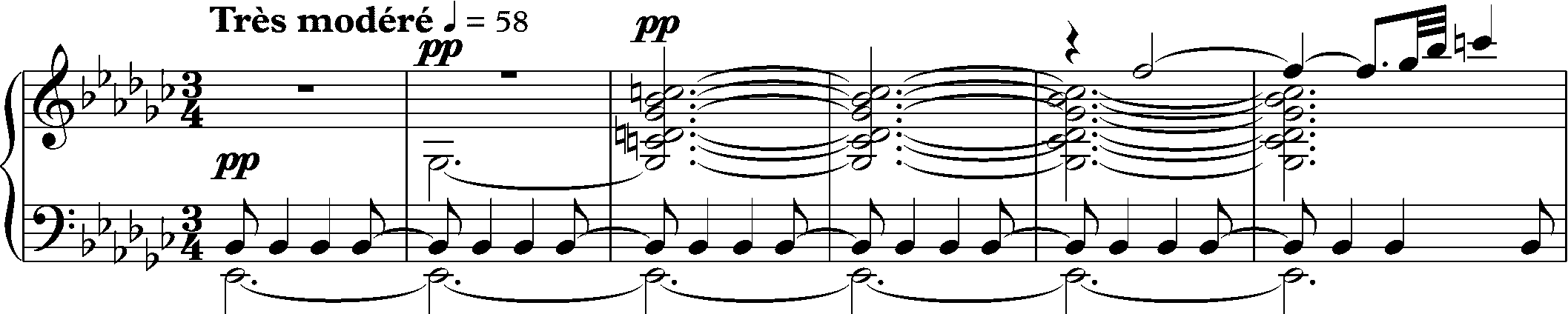
Debussy, Pour l'Egyptienne from 6 Epigraphes Antiques (solo piano version)

Russian composer Vladimir Rebikov used them extensively in his Three Idylles, Op. 50, written in 1913. Richard Strauss's An Alpine Symphony (1915) "starts and ends with the setting sun—a B flat minor chord cluster slowly built down."

Though much of his work was made public only years later, Charles Ives had been exploring the possibilities of the tone cluster—which he referred to as the "group chord"—for some time. In 1906–07, Ives composed his first mature piece to extensively feature tone clusters, Scherzo: Over the Pavements. (Note: Thomas B. Holmes (1985; 2002: p. 35) notes that the song Majority (aka The Masses), written by Ives in 1888 at the age of fourteen, incorporates tone clusters in the piano accompaniment. He correctly describes this as "a rebellious act for a beginning composer". He errs in calling it "probably the first documented use of a tone cluster in a score". Swafford (1998) observes that Ives chose to begin his 114 Songs (publ. 1922) with the work (pp. 227, 271, 325). And he too miscredits Ives with the "invention of the tone cluster" (p. 231). On the other hand, he valuably points to Ives's awareness that "tone clusters...had been there since time immemorial when large groups sang. The mistakes were part of the music" (p. 98).) Orchestrated for a nine-piece ensemble, it includes both black- and white-note clusters for the piano. Revised in 1913, it would not be recorded and published until the 1950s and would have to wait until 1963 to receive its first public performance.

During the same period that Ornstein was introducing tone clusters to the concert stage, Ives was developing a piece with what would become the most famous set of clusters: in the second movement, "Hawthorne", of the Concord Sonata (c. 1904–1915, publ. 1920, prem. 1928, rev. 1947), mammoth piano chords require a wooden bar almost fifteen inches long to play. The gentle clusters produced by the felt- or flannel-covered bar represent the sound of far-off church bells. Later in the movement, there are a series of five-note diatonic clusters for the right hand. In his notes to the score, Ives indicates that "these group-chords...may, if the player feels like it, be hit with the clenched fist."

Between 1911 and 1913, Ives also wrote ensemble pieces with tone clusters such as his Second String Quartet and the orchestral movements, Decoration Day and Fourth of July, though none of these would be publicly performed before the 1930s. (Note: Swafford (1998), pp. 251, 252, 472, for descriptions; Sinclair (1999), passim, for proper dating of Scherzo: Over the Pavements, Concord Sonata, and other named pieces: Second String Quartet (1911–13, prem. 1946, publ. 1954); Decoration Day (c. 1912–13, rev. c. 1923–24, prem. 1931, publ. 1962); Fourth of July (c. 1911–13, rev. c. 1931, publ./prem. 1932).)

=== In the work of Henry Cowell ===
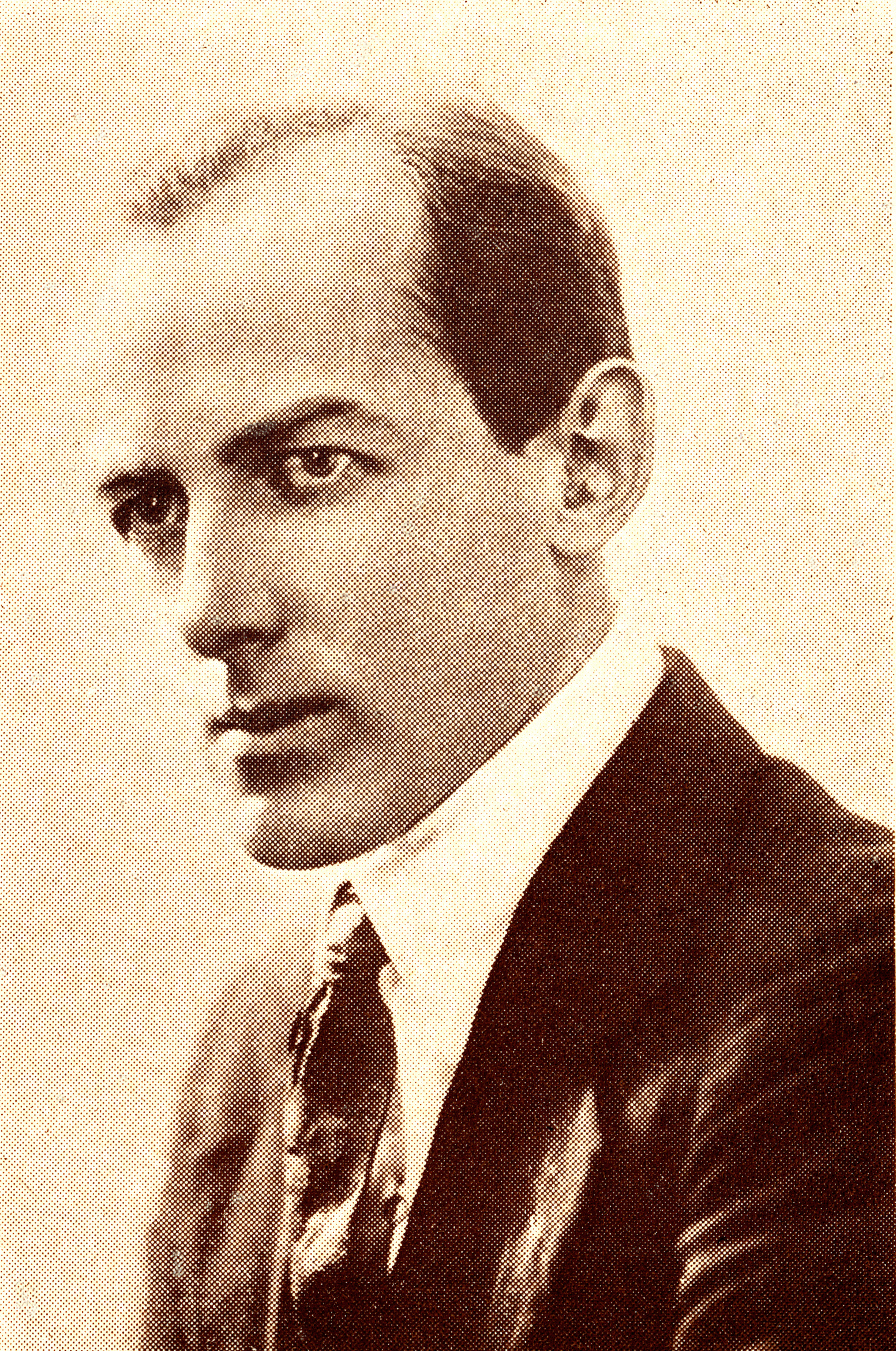
As a composer, performer, and theorist, Henry Cowell was largely responsible for establishing the tone cluster in the lexicon of modern classical music.

Tides of Manaunaun (1917)
The opening of Cowell's seminal piece

In June 1913, a sixteen-year-old Californian with no formal musical training wrote a solo piano piece, Adventures in Harmony, employing "primitive tone clusters". Henry Cowell would soon emerge as the seminal figure in promoting the cluster harmonic technique. Ornstein abandoned the concert stage in the early 1920s and, anyway, clusters had served him as practical harmonic devices, not as part of a larger theoretical mission. In the case of Ives, clusters comprised a relatively small part of his compositional output, much of which went unheard for years. For the intellectually ambitious Cowell—who heard Ornstein perform in New York in 1916—clusters were crucial to the future of music. He set out to explore their "overall, cumulative, and often programmatic effects".

Dynamic Motion (1916) for solo piano, written when Cowell was nineteen, has been described as "probably the first piece anywhere using secundal chords independently for musical extension and variation." Though that is not quite accurate, it does appear to be the first piece to employ chromatic clusters in such a manner. A solo piano piece Cowell wrote the following year, The Tides of Manaunaun (1917), would prove to be his most popular work and the composition most responsible for establishing the tone cluster as a significant element in Western classical music. (Cowell's early piano works are often erroneously dated; in the two cases above, as 1914 and 1912, respectively.) Assumed by some to involve an essentially random—or, more kindly, aleatoric—pianistic approach, Cowell would explain that precision is required in the writing and performance of tone clusters no less than with any other musical feature:

Tone clusters...on the piano [are] whole scales of tones used as chords, or at least three contiguous tones along a scale being used as a chord. And, at times, if these chords exceed the number of tones that you have fingers on your hand, it may be necessary to play these either with the flat of the hand or sometimes with the full forearm. This is not done from the standpoint of trying to devise a new piano technique, although it actually amounts to that, but rather because this is the only practicable method of playing such large chords. It should be obvious that these chords are exact and that one practices diligently in order to play them with the desired tone quality and to have them absolutely precise in nature.

Historian and critic Kyle Gann describes the broad range of ways in which Cowell constructed (and thus performed) his clusters and used them as musical textures, "sometimes with a top note brought out melodically, sometimes accompanying a left-hand melody in parallel."

Beginning in 1921, with an article serialized in The Freeman, an Irish cultural journal, Cowell popularized the term tone cluster. While he did not coin the phrase, as is often claimed, he appears to have been the first to use it with its current meaning. (Note: See Seachrist (2003), p. 215, n. 15, for an example of a claim that the "term was invented by Henry Cowell". Tone cluster had been used with a different meaning since at least 1910 by music theorist and educator Percy Goetschius (n.d., 111): referring to an example of three-part counterpoint, "there is some good chord-form at almost every accent, some harmonic tone-cluster towards which the parts unanimously lead." See also his correspondence, "Schoenberg's 'Harmony,'" in The New Music Review and Church Music Review, vol. 14, no. 168 (November 1915), p. 404: "I have regretted that I did not, in revising my 'Material', lay still greater stress upon the accidental tone-clusters such as you illustrate"; "in Ex. 318, No. 5, you will find the Mozart tone-cluster which you give in your Ex. 11.") During the 1920s and 1930s, Cowell toured widely through North America and Europe, playing his own experimental works, many built around tone clusters. In addition to The Tides of Manaunaun, Dynamic Motion, and its five "encores"—What's This (1917), Amiable Conversation (1917), Advertisement (1917), Antinomy (1917, rev. 1959; frequently misspelled "Antimony"), and Time Table (1917)—these include The Voice of Lir (1920), Exultation (1921), The Harp of Life (1924), Snows of Fujiyama (1924), Lilt of the Reel (1930), and Deep Color (1938). Tiger (1930) has a chord of 53 notes, probably the largest ever written for a single instrument until 1969. Along with Ives, Cowell wrote some of the first large-ensemble pieces to make extensive use of clusters. The Birth of Motion (c. 1920), his earliest such effort, combines orchestral clusters with glissando. "Tone Cluster", the second movement of Cowell's Concerto for Piano and Orchestra (1928, prem. 1978), employs a wide variety of clusters for the piano and each instrumental group. From a quarter-century later, his Symphony No. 11 (1953) features a sliding chromatic cluster played by muted violins.

In his theoretical work New Musical Resources (1930), a major influence on the classical avant-garde for many decades, Cowell argued that clusters should not be employed simply for color:

In harmony it is often better for the sake of consistency to maintain a whole succession of clusters, once they are begun; since one alone, or even two, may be heard as a mere effect, rather than as an independent and significant procedure, carried with musical logic to its inevitable conclusion.

=== In later classical music ===
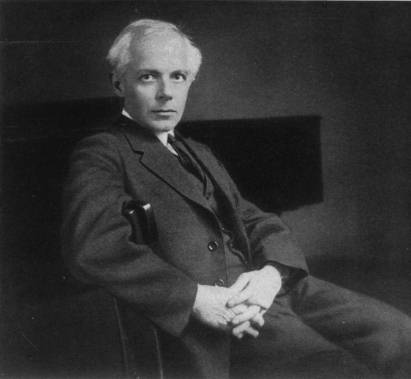
Béla Bartók and Henry Cowell met in December 1923. Early the next year, the Hungarian composer wrote Cowell to ask whether he might adopt tone clusters without causing offense.

In 1922, composer Dane Rudhyar, a friend of Cowell's, declared approvingly that the development of the tone cluster "imperilled [the] existence" of "the musical unit, the note". While that threat was not to be realized, clusters began to appear in the works of a growing number of composers. Already, Aaron Copland had written his Three Moods (aka Trois Esquisses; 1920–21) for piano—its name an apparent homage to a piece of Leo Ornstein's—which includes a triple-forte cluster. The most renowned composer to be directly inspired by Cowell's demonstrations of his tone cluster pieces was Béla Bartók, who requested Cowell's permission to employ the method. Bartók's First Piano Concerto, Piano Sonata, and the "Night Music" from the Out of Doors suite (all 1926), his first significant works after three years in which he produced little, extensively feature tone clusters.

In the 1930s, Cowell's student Lou Harrison utilized keyboard clusters in several works such as his Prelude for Grandpiano (1937). At least as far back as 1942, John Cage, who also studied under Cowell, began writing piano pieces with cluster chords; In the Name of the Holocaust, from December of that year, includes chromatic, diatonic, and pentatonic clusters. Olivier Messiaen's Vingt regards sur l'enfant Jésus (1944), often described as the most important solo piano piece of the first half of the twentieth century, employs clusters throughout. They would feature in numerous subsequent piano works, by a range of composers. Karlheinz Stockhausen's Klavierstück X (1961) makes bold, rhetorical use of chromatic clusters, scaled in seven degrees of width, from three to 36 semitones, as well as ascending and descending cluster arpeggios and cluster glissandi. Written two decades later, his Klavierstück XIII employs many of the same techniques, along with clusters that call for the pianist to sit down on the keyboard. George Crumb's Apparitions, Elegiac Songs, and Vocalises for Soprano and Amplified Piano (1979), a setting of verse by Walt Whitman, is filled with clusters, including an enormous one that introduces three of its sections. The piano part of the second movement of Joseph Schwantner's song cycle Magabunda (1983) has perhaps the single largest chord ever written for an individual instrument: all 88 notes on the keyboard.

While tone clusters are conventionally associated with the piano, and the solo piano repertoire in particular, they have also assumed important roles in compositions for chamber groups and larger ensembles. Robert Reigle identifies Croatian composer Josip Slavenski's organ-and-violin Sonata Religiosa (1925), with its sustained chromatic clusters, as "a missing link between Ives and [György] Ligeti." Bartók employs both diatonic and chromatic clusters in his Fourth String Quartet (1928). The sound mass technique in such works as Ruth Crawford Seeger's String Quartet (1931) and Iannis Xenakis's Metastaseis (1955) is an elaboration of the tone cluster. "Unlike most tonal and non-tonal linear dissonances, tone clusters are essentially static. The individual pitches are of secondary importance; it is the sound mass that is foremost." In one of the most famous pieces associated with the sound mass aesthetic, containing, "one of the largest clustering of individual pitches that has been written", Krzysztof Penderecki's Threnody to the Victims of Hiroshima (1959), for 52 string instruments, the quarter-tone clusters "see[m] to have abstracted and intensified the features that define shrieks of terror and keening cries of sorrow." Clusters appear in two sections of the electronic music of Stockhausen's Kontakte (1958–1960)—first as "hammering points...very difficult to synthesize", according to Robin Maconie, then as glissandi. In 1961, Ligeti wrote perhaps the largest cluster chord ever—in the orchestral Atmosphères, every note in the chromatic scale over a range of five octaves is played at once (quietly). Ligeti's organ works make extensive use of clusters. Volumina (1961–62), graphically notated, consists of static and mobile cluster masses, and calls on many advanced cluster-playing techniques.

The eighth movement of Messiaen's oratorio La Transfiguration de Notre Seigneur Jésus-Christ (1965–1969) features "a shimmering halo of tone-cluster glissandi" in the strings, evoking the "bright cloud" to which the narrative refers. Orchestral clusters are employed throughout Stockhausen's Fresco (1969) and Trans (1971). In Morton Feldman's Rothko Chapel (1971), "Wordless vocal tone clusters seep out through the skeletal arrangements of viola, celeste, and percussion." Aldo Clementi's chamber ensemble piece Ceremonial (1973) evokes both Verdi and Ives, combining the original extended-duration and mass cluster concepts: a weighted wooden board placed on an electric harmonium maintains a tone cluster throughout the work. Judith Bingham's Prague (1995) gives a brass band the opportunity to create tone clusters. Keyboard clusters are set against orchestral forces in piano concertos such as Einojuhani Rautavaara's first (1969) and Esa-Pekka Salonen's (2007), the latter suggestive of Messiaen. The choral compositions of Eric Whitacre often employ clusters, as a trademark of his style. Whitacre's chord clusters are fundamentally based around voice leading and not easily interpretable by traditional harmonic analysis.

Three composers who made frequent use of tone clusters for a wide variety of ensembles are Giacinto Scelsi, Alfred Schnittke—both of whom often worked with them in microtonal contexts—and Lou Harrison. Scelsi employed them for much of his career, including in his last large-scale work, Pfhat (1974), which premiered in 1986. They are found in works of Schnittke's ranging from the Quintet for Piano and Strings (1972–1976), where "microtonal strings fin[d] tone clusters between the cracks of the piano keys", to the choral Psalms of Repentance (1988). Harrison's many pieces featuring clusters include Pacifika Rondo (1963), Concerto for Organ with Percussion (1973), Piano Concerto (1983–1985), Three Songs for male chorus (1985), Grand Duo (1988), and Rhymes with Silver (1996).

=== In jazz ===
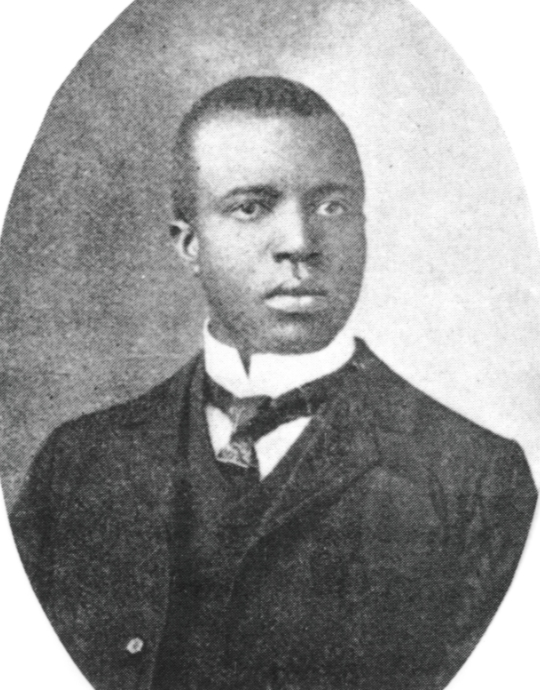
Scott Joplin wrote the first known published composition to include a musical sequence built around specifically notated tone clusters.

Tone clusters have been employed by jazz artists in a variety of styles, since the very beginning of the form. Around the turn of the twentieth century, Storyville pianist Jelly Roll Morton began performing a ragtime adaptation of a French quadrille, introducing large chromatic tone clusters played by his left forearm. The growling effect led Morton to dub the piece his "Tiger Rag". In 1909, Scott Joplin's deliberately experimental "Wall Street Rag" included a section prominently featuring notated tone clusters.

Scott Joplin, from Wall Street Rag

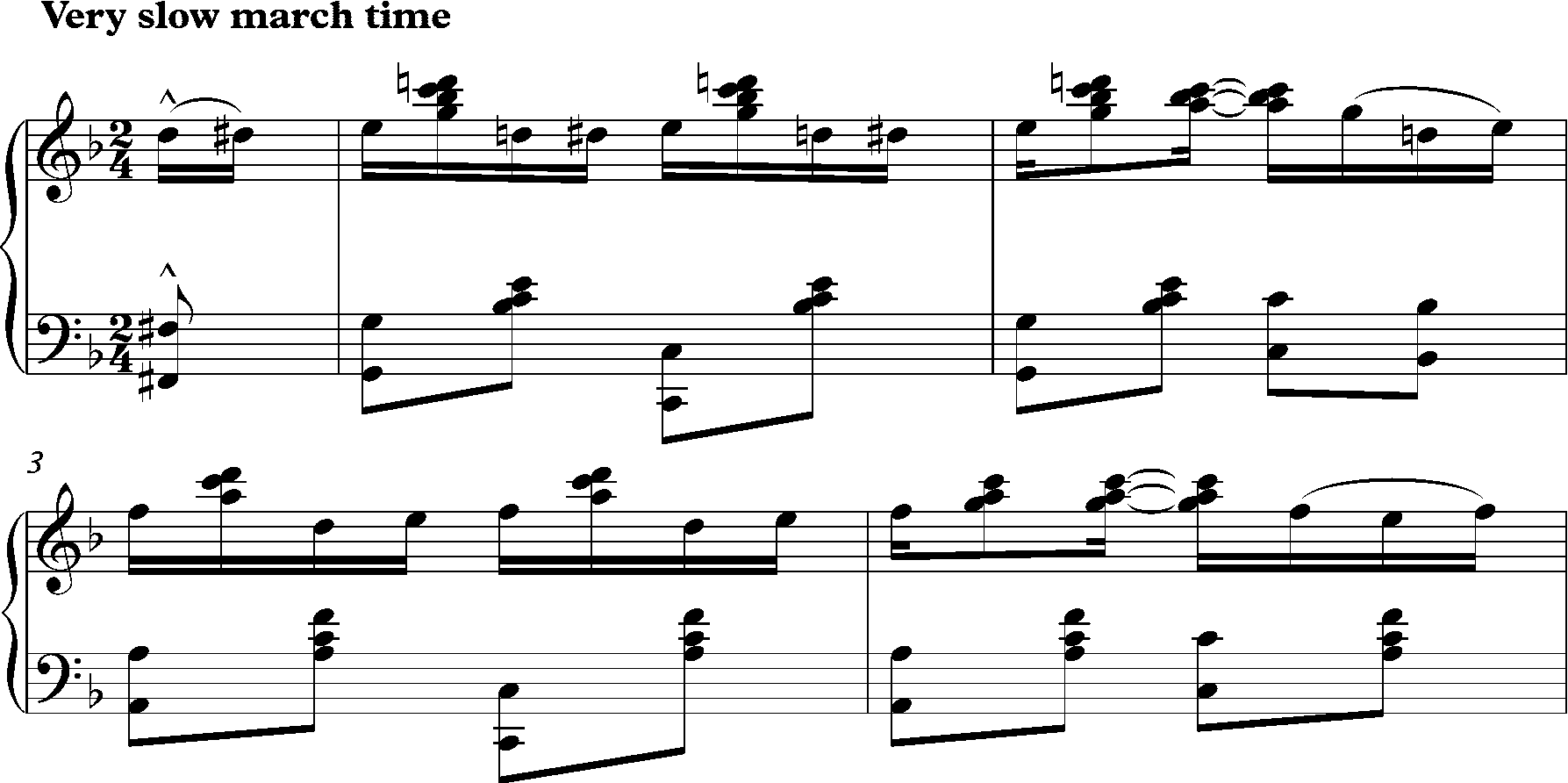
Scott Joplin, from Wall Street Rag

The fourth of Artie Matthews's Pastime Rags (1913–1920) features dissonant right-hand clusters. Thelonious Monk, in pieces such as "Bright Mississippi" (1962), "Introspection" (1946) and "Off Minor" (1947), uses clusters as dramatic figures within the central improvisation and to accent the tension at its conclusion. They are heard on Art Tatum's "Mr. Freddy Blues" (1950), undergirding the cross-rhythms. By 1953, Dave Brubeck was employing piano tone clusters and dissonance in a manner anticipating the style free jazz pioneer Cecil Taylor would soon develop. The approach of hard bop pianist Horace Silver is an even clearer antecedent to Taylor's use of clusters. During the same era, clusters appear as punctuation marks in the lead lines of Herbie Nichols. In "The Gig" (1955), described by Francis Davis as Nichols's masterpiece, "clashing notes and tone clusters depic[t] a pickup band at odds with itself about what to play." Recorded examples of Duke Ellington's piano cluster work include "Summertime" (1961) and ...And His Mother Called Him Bill (1967) and This One's for Blanton!, his tribute to a former bass player, recorded in 1972 with bassist Ray Brown. Bill Evans' interpretation of "Come Rain or Come Shine" from the album Portrait in Jazz (1960), opens with a striking five-tone cluster.

In jazz, as in classical music, tone clusters have not been restricted to the keyboard. In the 1930s, the Jimmie Lunceford Orchestra's "Stratosphere" included ensemble clusters among an array of progressive elements. The Stan Kenton Orchestra's April 1947 recording of "If I Could Be With You One Hour Tonight", arranged by Pete Rugolo, features a dramatic four-note trombone cluster at the end of the second chorus. As described by critic Fred Kaplan, a 1950 performance by the Duke Ellington Orchestra features arrangements with the collective "blowing rich, dark, tone clusters that evoke Ravel". Chord clusters also feature in the scores of arranger Gil Evans. In his characteristically imaginative arrangement of George Gershwin's "There's a boat that's leaving soon for New York" from the album Porgy and Bess, Evans contributes chord clusters orchestrated on flutes, alto saxophone and muted trumpets as a background to accompany Miles Davis' solo improvisation. In the early 1960s, arrangements by Bob Brookmeyer and Gerry Mulligan for Mulligan's Concert Jazz Band employed tone clusters in a dense style bringing to mind both Ellington and Ravel. Eric Dolphy's bass clarinet solos would often feature "microtonal clusters summoned by frantic overblowing". Critic Robert Palmer called the "tart tone cluster" that "pierces a song's surfaces and penetrates to its heart" a specialty of guitarist Jim Hall's.

Clusters are especially prevalent in the realm of free jazz. Cecil Taylor has used them extensively as part of his improvisational method since the mid-1950s. Like much of his musical vocabulary, his clusters operate "on a continuum somewhere between melody and percussion". One of Taylor's primary purposes in adopting clusters was to avoid the dominance of any specific pitch. Leading free jazz composer, bandleader, and pianist Sun Ra often used them to rearrange the musical furniture, as described by scholar John F. Szwed:

When he sensed that [a] piece needed an introduction or an ending, a new direction or fresh material, he would call for a space chord, a collectively improvised tone cluster at high volume which "would suggest a new melody, maybe a rhythm." It was a pianistically conceived device which created another context for the music, a new mood, opening up fresh tonal areas.

As free jazz spread in the 1960s, so did the use of tone clusters. In comparison with what John Litweiler describes as Taylor's "endless forms and contrasts", the solos of Muhal Richard Abrams employ tone clusters in a similarly free, but more lyrical, flowing context. Guitarist Sonny Sharrock made them a central part of his improvisations; in Palmer's description, he executed "glass-shattering tone clusters that sounded like someone was ripping the pickups out of the guitar without having bothered to unplug it from its overdriven amplifier." Pianist Marilyn Crispell has been another major free jazz proponent of the tone cluster, frequently in collaboration with Anthony Braxton, who played with Abrams early in his career. Since the 1990s, Matthew Shipp has built on Taylor's innovations with the form. European free jazz pianists who have contributed to the development of the tone cluster palette include Gunter Hampel and Alexander von Schlippenbach.

Don Pullen, who bridged free and mainstream jazz, "had a technique of rolling his wrists as he improvised—the outside edges of his hands became scarred from it—to create moving tone clusters", writes critic Ben Ratliff. "Building up from arpeggios, he could create eddies of noise on the keyboard...like concise Cecil Taylor outbursts." In the description of Joachim Berendt, Pullen "uniquely melodized cluster playing and made it tonal. He phrases impulsively raw clusters with his right hand and yet embeds them in clear, harmonically functional tonal chords simultaneously played with the left hand." John Medeski employs tone clusters as keyboardist for Medeski Martin & Wood, which mixes free jazz elements into its soul jazz/jam band style.

=== In popular music ===
Like jazz, rock and roll has made use of tone clusters since its birth, if characteristically in a less deliberate manner—most famously, Jerry Lee Lewis's live-performance piano technique of the 1950s, involving fists, feet, and derrière. Since the 1960s, much drone music, which crosses the lines between rock, electronic, and experimental music, has been based on tone clusters. On The Velvet Underground's "Sister Ray", recorded in September 1967, organist John Cale uses tone clusters within the context of a drone; the song is apparently the closest approximation on record of the band's early live sound. Around the same time, Doors keyboardist Ray Manzarek began introducing clusters into his solos during live performances of the band's hit "Light My Fire".

Kraftwerk's self-titled 1970 debut album employs organ clusters to add variety to its repeated tape sequences. In 1971, critic Ed Ward lauded the "tone-cluster vocal harmonies" created by Jefferson Airplane's three lead singers, Grace Slick, Marty Balin, and Paul Kantner. Tangerine Dream's 1972 double album Zeit is replete with clusters performed on synthesizer. The Beatles' 1965 song "We Can Work It Out" features a momentarily grating tone cluster with voices singing A♯ and C♯ against the accompanying keyboard playing a sustained chord on B to the word "time". The Band's 1968 song "The Weight" from their debut album Music from Big Pink features a dissonant vocal refrain with suspensions culminating in a 3-note cluster to the words "you put the load right on me."

The sound of tone clusters played on the organ became a convention in radio drama for dreams. Clusters are often used in the scoring of horror and science-fiction films. (Note: For a discussion of the use of tone clusters in film scoring, see Huckvale 1990, pp. 1–35. For descriptions of their role in three individual films, Hosokawa 2004, p. 60n21; for To the Devil a Daughter, Huckvale 2008, pp. 179–181; and, for Close Encounters, Neil Lerner, "Nostalgia, Masculinist Discourse, and Authoritarianism in John Williams' Scores for Star Wars and Close Encounters of the Third Kind," in Off the Planet, pp. 96–107; 105–106.) For a 2004 production of the play Tone Clusters by Joyce Carol Oates, composer Jay Clarke—a member of the indie rock bands Dolorean and The Standard—employed clusters to "subtly build the tension", in contrast to what he perceived in the cluster pieces by Cowell and Ives suggested by Oates: "Some of it was like music to murder somebody to; it was like horror-movie music."

== Use in other music ==
In traditional Japanese gagaku, the imperial court music, a tone cluster performed on shō (a type of mouth organ) is generally employed as a harmonic matrix. Yoritsune Matsudaira, active from the late 1920s to the early 2000s, merged gagaku's harmonies and tonalities with avant-garde Western techniques. Much of his work is built on the shō's ten traditional cluster formations. Lou Harrison's Pacifika Rondo, which mixes Eastern and Western instrumentation and styles, mirrors the gagaku approach—sustained organ clusters emulate the sound and function of the shō. The shō also inspired Benjamin Britten in creating the instrumental texture of his 1964 dramatic church parable Curlew River. Its sound pervades the characteristically sustained cluster chords played on a chamber organ . Traditional Korean court and aristocratic music employs passages of simultaneous ornamentation on multiple instruments, creating dissonant clusters; this technique is reflected in the work of 20th-century Korean German composer Isang Yun.

Several East Asian free reed instruments, including the shō, were modeled on the sheng, an ancient Chinese folk instrument later incorporated into more formal musical contexts. Wubaduhesheng, one of the traditional chord formations played on the sheng, involves a three-pitch cluster. Malayan folk musicians employ an indigenous mouth organ that, like the shō and sheng, produces tone clusters. The characteristic musical form played on the bin-baja, a strummed harp of central India's Pardhan people, has been described as a "rhythmic ostinato on a tone cluster".

Among the Asante, in the region that is today encompassed by Ghana, tone clusters are used in traditional trumpet music. A distinctive "tongue-rattling technique gives a greater vibrancy to...already dissonant tonal cluster[s].... [I]ntentional dissonance dispels evil spirits, and the greater the clangor, the greater the sound barrage.

== Notes and references ==
=== Sources ===
- Altman, Rick (2004). Silent Film Sound. New York and Chichester: Columbia University Press. ISBN 0-231-11662-4
- Anderson, Iain (2006). This Is Our Music: Free Jazz, the Sixties, And American Culture. Philadelphia: University of Pennsylvania Press. ISBN 0-8122-3980-6
- Anderson, Martin (2002). Liner notes to Leo Ornstein: Piano Music (Hyperion 67320) (excerpted online).
- Bartók, Peter, Moses Asch, Marian Distler, and Sidney Cowell (1963). Liner notes to Henry Cowell: Piano Music (Folkways 3349); revised by Sorrel Hays (1993) (Smithsonian Folkways 40801).
- Berendt, Joachim E. (1992). The Jazz Book: From Ragtime to Fusion and Beyond. Chicago; Lawrence Hill. ISBN 1-55652-098-0
- Berlin, Edward W. (1994). King of Ragtime: Scott Joplin and His Era. New York and Oxford: Oxford University Press. ISBN 0-19-510108-1
- Brackett, David (2002). "'Where It's At': Postmodern Theory and the Contemporary Musical Field", in Postmodern Music/Postmodern Thought, ed. Judith Irene Lochhead and Joseph Auner. New York and London: Routledge. ISBN 0-8153-3819-8
- Broyles, Michael (2004). Mavericks and Other Traditions in American Music. New Haven, Conn., and London: Yale University Press. ISBN 0-300-10045-0
- Bussy, Pascal (2004). Kraftwerk: Man, Machine And Music. London: SAF. ISBN 0-946719-70-5
- Chandler, John (September 28, 2004). "Play's Music Is More than a Backdrop". Portland Tribune. Archived from the original on 2016-04-16.
- Chase, Gilbert (1992 [1987]). America's Music: From the Pilgrims to the Present, rev. 3d ed. Champaign: University of Illinois Press. ISBN 0-252-06275-2
- Cooke, Mervyn (1998). "New Horizons in the Twentieth Century", in The Cambridge Companion to the Piano, ed. David Rowland. Cambridge; Cambridge University Press. ISBN 0-521-47986-X
- Cope, David (2001). New Directions in Music. Prospect Heights, Illinois: Waveland Press. ISBN 1-57766-108-7.
- Cowell, Henry (1921). "Harmonic Development in Music" [part 3], The Freeman, vol. 3 (April 13, 1921).
- Cowell, Henry (1993 [1963]). "Henry Cowell's Comments: The Composer Describes Each of the Selections in the Order in Which They Appear". Track 20 of Henry Cowell: Piano Music (Smithsonian Folkways 40801).
- Determeyer, Eddy (2006). Rhythm Is Our Business: Jimmie Lunceford and the Harlem Express. Ann Arbor: University of Michigan Press. ISBN 0-472-11553-7
- Enstice, Wayne, and Janis Stockhouse (2004). Jazzwomen: Conversations with Twenty-one Musicians. Bloomington: Indiana University Press. ISBN 0-253-34436-0
- Finney, Ross Lee (1967). "Webern's Opus 6, no. 1", Perspectives of New Music, vol. 6, no. 1 (Autumn–Winter): p. 74
- Floyd Jr., Samuel A. (1995). The Power of Black Music: Interpreting Its History from Africa to the United States. New York and Oxford: Oxford University Press. ISBN 0-19-508235-4
- Gann, Kyle (1997). "Subversive Prophet: Henry Cowell as Theorist and Critic", in The Whole World of Music: A Henry Cowell Symposium, ed. David Nicholls (1997). Amsterdam: Harwood Academic Press. ISBN 90-5755-003-2
- Goetschius, Percy (n.d.) Exercises in Elementary Counterpoint, fifth edition. New York: G. Schirmer.
- Griffiths, Paul (1995). Modern Music and After: Directions since 1945. New York and Oxford: Oxford University Press. ISBN 0-19-816511-0
- Halbreich, Harry (1988). Liner notes to Giacinto Scelsi: Aion/Pfhat/Konx-Om-Pax, trans. Elisabeth Buzzard (Accord 200402).
- Harrison, Max (1997). "Jazz", in The New Grove Gospel, Blues, and Jazz, with Spirituals and Ragtime, ed. Paul Oliver, Max Harrison, and William Bolcom. New York and London: W. W. Norton. ISBN 0-393-30357-8
- Harvey, Jonathan (1975). The Music of Stockhausen: An Introduction. Berkeley and Los Angeles: University of California Press, 1975.
- Hazell, Ed (1997). "Mountain High: Cecil Taylor Still Scales the Heights," Boston Phoenix, September 11–18 (available online).
- Henck, Herbert (1980). Karlheinz Stockhausens Klavierstück X: Ein Beitrag zum Verständnis serieller Kompositionstechnik: Historie/Theorie/Analyse/Praxis/Dokumentation, 2nd corrected and expanded ed. Cologne: Neuland Musikverlag HerbertHenck, 1980.
- Henck, Herbert (2004). Klaviercluster: Geschichte, Theorie und Praxis einer Klanggestalt. Signale aus Köln 9. Münster: LIT Verlag. ISBN 3-8258-7560-1
- Herchenröder, Martin (2002). "From Darmstadt to Stockholm: Tracing the Swedish Contribution to the Development of a New Organ Style", in The Organ as a Mirror of Its Time: North European Reflections, 1610–2000, ed. Kerala J. Snyder. New York and Oxford: Oxford University Press. ISBN 0-19-514415-5
- Herd, Judith Ann (2008). "Western-Influenced 'Classical' Music in Japan", in The Ashgate Research Companion to Japanese Music, ed. Alison McQueen Tokita and David W. Hughes. Aldershot, UK, and Burlington, Vermont: Ashgate. ISBN 978-0-7546-5699-9
- Hicks, Michael (1999). Sixties Rock: Garage, Psychedelic, and Other Satisfactions. Urbana: University of Illinois Press. ISBN 0-252-06915-3.
- Hicks, Michael (2002). Henry Cowell, Bohemian. Urbana: University of Illinois Press. ISBN 0-252-02751-5
- Hinson, Maurice (1990). The Pianist's Guide to Transcriptions, Arrangements, and Paraphrases. Bloomington and Indianapolis: Indiana University Press. ISBN 0-253-21456-4.
- Hinson, Maurice, and Wesley Roberts (2006). The Piano in Chamber Ensemble: An Annotated Guide. Bloomington and Indianapolis: Indiana University Press. ISBN 0-253-34696-7.
- Hitchcock, H. Wiley (2004). Liner notes to Charles Ives: Piano Sonata No. 2 'Concord' (Naxos 8.559221).
- Hogan, Patrick Colm (2003). Cognitive Science, Literature, and the Arts: A Guide for Humanists. New York and London: Routledge. ISBN 0-415-94244-6.
- Holmes, Thomas B. (1985). Electronic and Experimental Music: Pioneers in Technology and Composition, first edition. New York and London: Routledge..
- Holmes, Thomas B. (2002). Electronic and Experimental Music: Pioneers in Technology and Composition, second edition. New York and London: Routledge. ISBN 0-415-93643-8.
- Horowitz, Joseph (2010). Program notes to performance of Albéniz's Iberia by Pedro Carboné, University of Chicago, Mandel Hall, March 5 (available online).
- Hosokawa, Shuhei (2004). "Atomic Overtones and Primitive Undertones: Akira Ifukube's Sound Design for Godzilla". In Off the Planet: Music, Sound and Science Fiction Cinema, edited by Philip Hayward, 42–60. Eastleigh, UK: John Libbey Publications. ISBN 0-86196-644-9.
- Howard, Keith (2006). Perspectives on Korean Music, Vol. 2—Creating Korean Music: Tradition, Innovation and the Discourse of Identity. Farnham, Surrey: Ashgate. ISBN 0-7546-5729-9.
- Huckvale, David (1990). "Twins of Evil: An Investigation into the Aesthetics of Film Music". Popular Music, vol. 9, no. 1 (January): pp. 1–35.
- Huckvale, David (2008). Hammer Film Scores and the Musical Avant-Garde. Jefferson, North Carolina: McFarland. ISBN 978-0-7864-3456-5.
- Ives, Charles (1947). "Piano Sonata No. 2, 'Concord, Mass., 1840–1860'", 2nd ed. New York and London: Associated Music Publishers.
- Jones, Pamela (2008). Alcides Lanza: Portrait of a Composer. Montreal and Kingston, Ontario: McGill-Queen's University Press. ISBN 0-7735-3264-1
- Kaminski, Joseph (2012). Asante Ivory Trumpet Music in Ghana: Culture Tradition and Sound Barrage. Farnham, Surrey, and Burlington, Vermont: Ashgate. ISBN 978-1-4094-2684-4
- Keillor, Elaine (2000). Liner notes to Canadians at the Keyboard (Carleton Sound 1008) (available online).
- Kimbell, David (1991). Italian Opera. Cambridge, New York, and Melbourne: Cambridge University Press. ISBN 0-521-46643-1
- Kirkpatrick, Ralph (1953). Domenico Scarlatti. Princeton, New Jersey: Princeton University Press.
- Knight, Roderic (1985). "The Harp in India Today", Ethnomusicology, vol. 29, no. 1 (Winter), pp. 9–28.
- Kramer, Lawrence (2000). Walt Whitman and Modern Music: War, Desire, and the Trials of Nationhood. New York: Garland/Taylor & Francis. ISBN 0-8153-3154-1
- Lampert, Vera, and László Somfai (1984 [1980]). "Béla Bartók", in The New Grove Modern Masters: Bartók, Stravinsky, Hindemith. New York: W. W. Norton. ISBN 0-393-31592-4
- Larson, Andrew (December 2006). "Textural Density in the Choral Music of Eric Whitacre". The Choral Journal. 47 (6): 22–33. JSTOR 23557137.
- Lichtenwanger, William (1986). The Music of Henry Cowell: A Descriptive Catalogue. Brooklyn, New York: Brooklyn College Institute for Studies in American Music. ISBN 0-914678-26-4
- Litweiler, John (1990 [1984]). The Freedom Principle: Jazz After 1958. New York: Da Capo. ISBN 0-306-80377-1
- Lomax, Alan (2001 [1950]). Mister Jelly Roll: The Fortunes of Jelly Roll Morton, New Orleans Creole and "Inventor of Jazz". Berkeley and Los Angeles: University of California Press. ISBN 0-520-22530-9
- Maconie, Robin (2005). Other Planets: The Music of Karlheinz Stockhausen. Lanham, Maryland., Toronto, and Oxford: Scarecrow Press. ISBN 0-8108-5356-6
- Magee, Jeffrey (1998). "Ragtime and Early Jazz", in The Cambridge History of American Music, ed. David Nicholls. Cambridge, New York, and Melbourne: Cambridge University Press. ISBN 0-521-45429-8
- Malm, William P. (2000 [1959]). Traditional Japanese Music and Musical Instruments. New York and London: Kodansha. ISBN 4-7700-2395-2
- Meadows, Eddie S. (2003). Bebop to Cool: Context, Ideology, and Musical Identity. Westport, Connecticut: Greenwood. ISBN 0-313-30071-2
- Meister, Barbara (2006). Music Musique: French and American Piano Composition in the Jazz Age. Bloomington and Indianapolis: Indiana University Press. ISBN 0-253-34608-8
- Miller, Leta E., and Frederic Lieberman (2004 [1998]). Composing a World: Lou Harrison, Musical Wayfarer. Urbana and Chicago: University of Illinois Press. ISBN 0-252-07188-3
- Morrison, Craig (1998 [1996]). Go Cat Go!: Rockabilly Music and Its Makers. Urbana and Chicago: University of Illinois Press. ISBN 0-252-06538-7
- Nectoux, Jean-Michel (2004). Gabriel Fauré: A Musical Life, trans. Roger Nichols. Cambridge: Cambridge University Press. ISBN 0-521-61695-6
- Neumann, Frederick (1983). Ornamentation in Baroque and Post-baroque Music, 3rd. corr. ed. Princeton, New Jersey: Princeton University Press. ISBN 0-691-02707-2
- Nicholls, David (1991 [1990]). American Experimental Music 1890–1940. Cambridge, New York, and Melbourne: Cambridge University Press. ISBN 0-521-42464-X
- Norman, Katharine (2004). Sounding Art: Eight Literary Excursions through Electronic Music. Farnham, Surrey: Ashgate. ISBN 0-7546-0426-8
- Ostransky, Leroy (1969). The World of Music. Englewood Cliffs, New Jersey: Prentice-Hall.
- Palmer, Robert (September 4, 1986). "Jazz: Jim Hall Trio in Village", The New York Times.
- Palmer, Robert (September 19, 1991). "Ask the Ages: Sonny Sharrock", Rolling Stone.).
- Pareles, Jon (February 7, 1988). "Jazz: Cecil Taylor Quintet", The New York Times.
- Pareles, Jon (April 15, 2000). "Jazz Review: Trio Toys with Textures and Melts Down Idioms", The New York Times.
- Patterson, Archie (2001). "Zeit", in All Music Guide to Electronica: The Definitive Guide to Electronic Music, ed. Vladimir Bogdanov et al. San Francisco: Backbeat. ISBN 0-87930-628-9
- Pino, David (1998 [1980]). The Clarinet and Clarinet Playing. Mineola, New York: Dover. ISBN 0-486-40270-3
- Pollack, Howard (2000 [1999]). Aaron Copland: The Life and Work of an Uncommon Man. Urbana and Chicago: University of Illinois Press. ISBN 0-252-06900-5
- Ratliff, Ben (2002). Jazz: A Critic's Guide to the 100 Most Important Recordings. New York: Times Books/Henry Holt. ISBN 0-8050-7068-0
- Reed, Alice S. (2005). Charles Edward Ives and His Piano Sonata No. 2 "Concord, Mass. 1840–1860". Victoria, Canada: Trafford. ISBN 1-4120-4474-X
- Rigoni, Michel (2001). Le rêve de Lucifer de Karlheinz Stockhausen. [France]: Éditions tum-Michel de Maule. ISBN 2-87623-103-4
- Rooksby, Rikky (2003). Chord Master: How to Choose and Play the Right Guitar Chords. San Francisco: Backbeat. ISBN 0-87930-766-8
- Salzman, Eric (1996). Liner notes to John Cage...In Memoriam (Troy 197 [Albany Records]).
- Satola, Mark (2005). "Piano Sonata, Sz. 80 (1926)", in All Music Guide to Classical Music: The Definitive Guide to Classical Music, ed. Chris Woodstra, Gerald Brennan, and Allen Schrott. San Francisco: Backbeat. ISBN 0-87930-865-6
- Schonberg, Harold C. (1987). The Great Pianists: From Mozart to the Present. New York: Simon & Schuster/Fireside. ISBN 0-671-63837-8
- Schwartz, Jeff (1996). "'Sister Ray': Some Pleasures of a Musical Text", in The Velvet Underground Companion: Four Decades of Commentary, ed. Albin Zak III. New York: Schirmer (1997). ISBN 0-02-864627-4
- Seachrist, Denise A. (2003). The Musical World of Halim El-Dabh. Kent, Ohio: Kent State University Press. ISBN 0-87338-752-X
- Shreffler, Anne (1991). Liner notes to Ives & Copland Sonatas (Cedille 90000 005).
- Sinclair, James B. (1999). A Descriptive Catalogue of the Music of Charles Ives. New Haven and London: Yale University Press (available online). ISBN 0-300-07601-0
- Smither, Howard E. (2000). A History of the Oratorio, Vol. 4: The Oratorio in the Nineteenth and Twentieth Centuries. Chapel Hill and London: University of North Carolina Press. ISBN 0-8078-2511-5
- Spaeth, Sigmund Gottfried (1948). A History of Popular Music in America. New York: Random House.
- Steinberg, Michael (2000). The Concerto: A Listener's Guide. New York and Oxford: Oxford University Press. ISBN 0-19-513931-3
- Steinitz, Richard (2003). György Ligeti: Music of the Imagination. Boston: Northeastern University Press. ISBN 1-55553-551-8
- Stevens, Halsey (1993). The Life and Music of Béla Bartók, 3rd ed. Oxford and New York: Oxford University Press. ISBN 0-19-816349-5
- Swafford, Jan (1998 [1996]). Charles Ives: A Life with Music. New York and London: W. W. Norton. ISBN 0-393-31719-6
- Swift, Richard (1972). "Threnody/Epitaph for Moonlight, by R. Murray Schafer", Notes, second series, vol. 2, no. 3 (March). ISSN 0027-4380
- Szwed, John F. (1998 [1997]). Space Is the Place: The Lives and Times of Sun Ra. New York: Da Capo. ISBN 0-306-80855-2
- Tommasini, Anthony (February 3, 2007). "A Conductor's Concerto, Influenced and Inspired", The New York Times.
- Trueman, Daniel (1999). "Three "Classical" Violins and a Fiddle" (PDF). Reinventing the Violin. Princeton University, Department of Music. Archived from the original (PDF) on May 12, 2003.
- Tyler, Don (2008). Music of the Postwar Era. Westport, Connecticut: Greenwood. ISBN 978-0-313-34191-5
- Wang Zheng-Ting (2005). "How to Improve the Sheng as a Concert Instrument?" Chime, nos. 16–17 (December), pp. 57–71. ISSN 0926-7263
- Watrous, Peter (September 1, 1989). "Sounds Around Town", The New York Times.
- Weinstein, Norman C. (1993). A Night in Tunisia: Imaginings of Africa in Jazz. Milwaukee: Hal Leonard. ISBN 0-87910-167-9
- Weinstein, Norman C. (1996). "Pianist/Composer Matthew Shipp Gives Jazz a Geological Swing", Boston Phoenix, July 11–18 (available online).
- Wilkins, Margaret Lucy (2006). Creative Music Composition: The Young Composer's Voice. Boca Raton, Florida.: CRC Press. ISBN 0-415-97467-4
- W.S.M. (December 1958). "Strauss, Richard. Alpine Symphony, Op. 64. Saxon State Orchestra, Dresden conducted by Karl Böhin. D.G.G. DGM18476" [review], Gramophone.
- Yunwha Rao, Nancy (2004). "Henry Cowell and His Chinese Music Heritage: Theory of Sliding Tone and His Orchestral Work of 1953–1965", in Locating East Asia in Western Art Music, ed. Yayoi Uno Everett and Frederick Lau. Middletown, Conn.: Wesleyan University Press. ISBN 0-8195-6661-6
- Zwenzner, Michael (2001). Liner notes to American Piano Concertos: Henry Cowell, trans. Steven Lindberg (col legno 07989).
