= Leo Ornstein =

American composer and pianist (1895–2002)

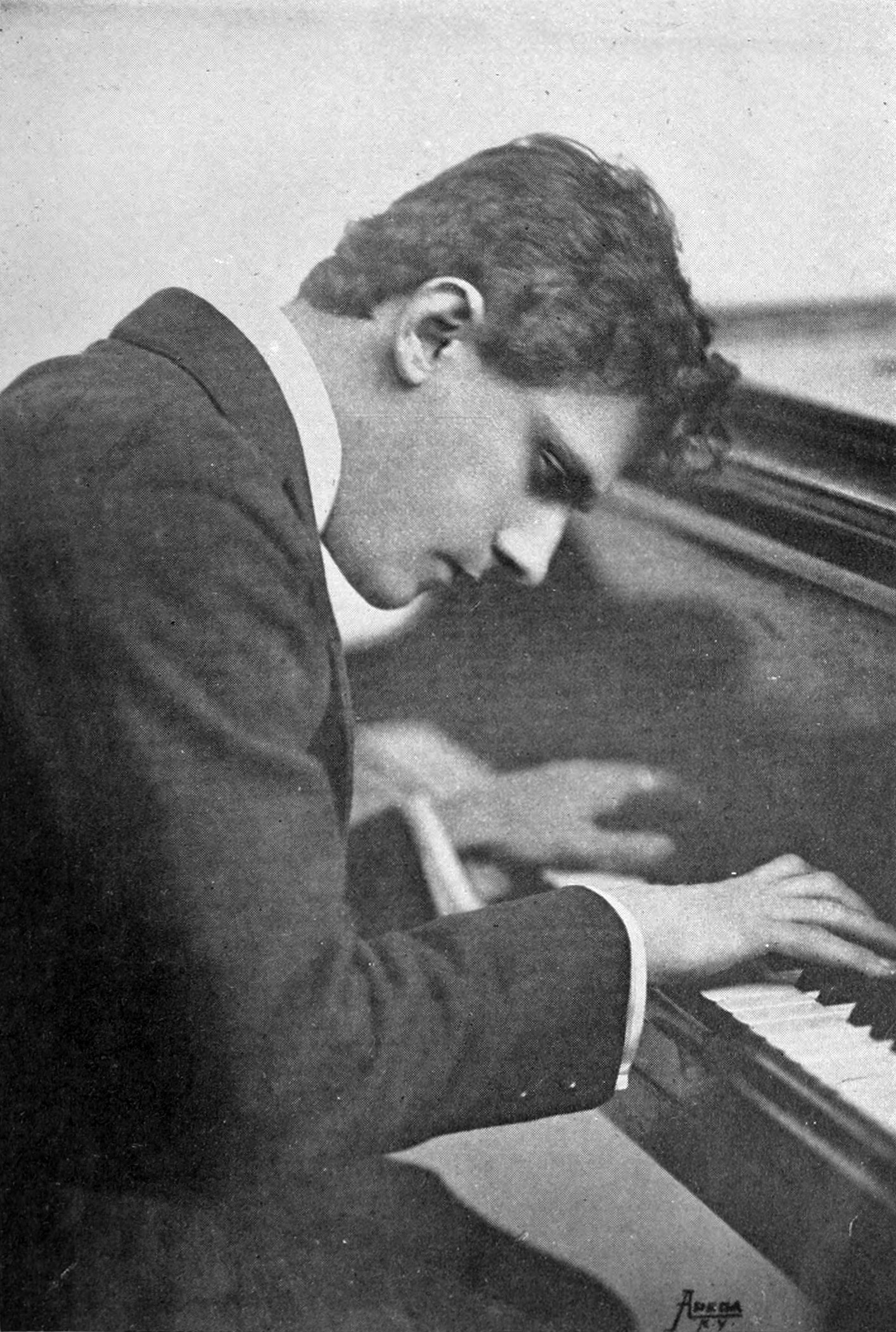
- Leo Ornstein c. 1918
- Born: December 11, 1895; Kremenchug, Poltava Governorate, Russian Empire (now Kremenchuk, Poltava Oblast, Ukraine)
- Died: February 24, 2002 (aged 106); Green Bay, Wisconsin, US
- Occupations: Composer; pianist; teacher
- Children: 2, including Severo

Signature
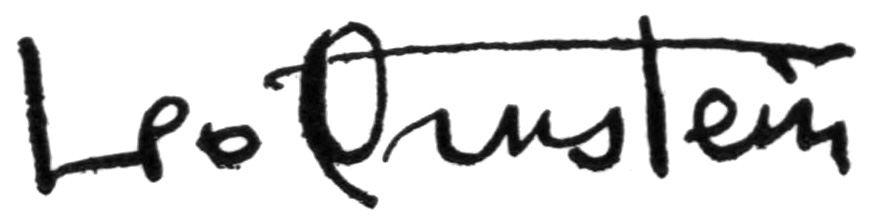

Leo Ornstein (born Lev Ornshteyn; Russian: Лев Орнштейн; c. December 11, 1895 (Note: Ornstein's exact date of birth is ambiguous, with various sources stating dates in 1892, 1893 or 1895, but official documents from 1917, 1920 and 1942 suggest December 11 1895 as his date of birth.) – February 24, 2002) was an American experimental composer and pianist of the early twentieth century. His performances of works by avant-garde composers and his own innovative and even shocking pieces made him a cause célèbre on both sides of the Atlantic. The bulk of his experimental works were written for piano.

Ornstein was the first important composer to make extensive use of the tone cluster. As a pianist, he was considered a world-class talent. By the mid-1920s, he had walked away from his fame and soon disappeared from popular memory. Though he gave his last public concert before the age of forty, he continued writing music for another half-century and beyond. Largely forgotten for decades, he was rediscovered in the mid-1970s. Ornstein completed his eighth and final piano sonata in September 1990 at the age of at least ninety-four, making him the oldest published composer in history at the time (a mark since passed by Elliott Carter).

== Early life ==
Ornstein was born in Kremenchug, Poltava Governorate, Russian Empire (today part of Ukraine). He grew up in a musical environment—his father was a Jewish cantor (Hazzan), while a violinist uncle encouraged the young boy's studies. Ornstein was recognized early on as a prodigy on the piano; in 1902, when the celebrated Polish pianist Josef Hofmann visited Kremenchuk, he heard the six-year-old Ornstein perform. Hofmann gave him a letter of recommendation to the highly regarded Saint Petersburg Conservatory. Soon after, Ornstein was accepted as a pupil at the Imperial School of Music in Kiev, then headed by Vladimir Puchalsky. A death in the family forced Ornstein's return home. In 1903, Ossip Gabrilowitsch heard him play and recommended him to the Moscow Conservatory. In 1904, the nine-year-old Ornstein auditioned for and was accepted by the St. Petersburg school. There he studied composition with Alexander Glazunov and piano with Anna Yesipova.

By the age of eleven, Ornstein was earning his way by coaching opera singers. To escape the pogroms incited by the nationalist and antisemitic organisation Union of the Russian People, the family emigrated to the United States on February 24, 1906, exactly ninety-six years before his death. They settled in New York's Lower East Side, and Ornstein enrolled in the Institute of Musical Art—predecessor to the Juilliard School—where he studied piano with Bertha Feiring Tapper. In 1911, he made a well-received New York debut with pieces by Bach, Beethoven, Chopin, and Schumann. Recordings two years later of works by Chopin, Grieg, and Poldini demonstrate, according to music historian Michael Broyles, "a pianist of sensitivity, prodigious technical ability, and artistic maturity."

== Fame and "futurism" ==
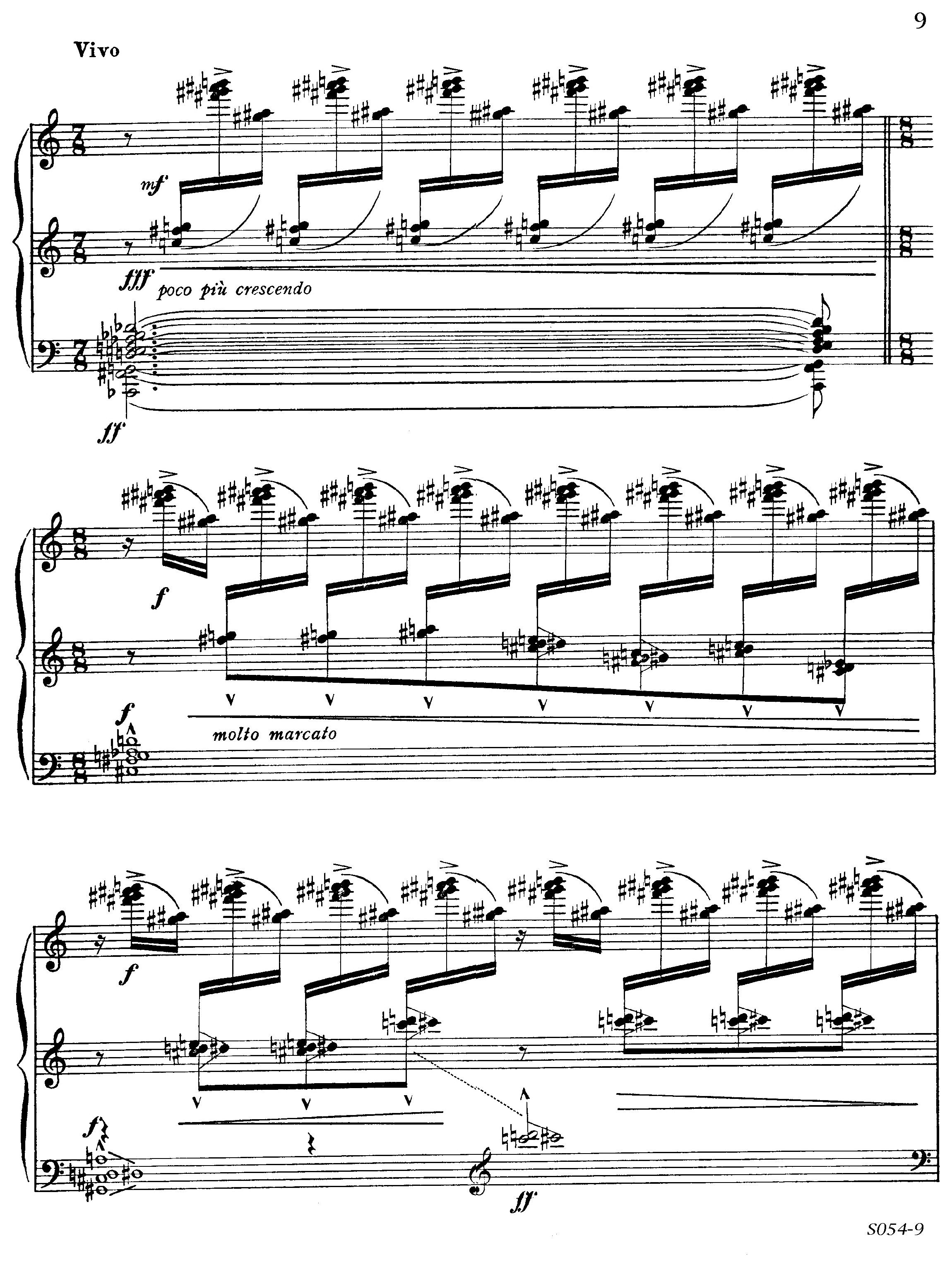
The violent tone clusters of Wild Men's Dance (ca. 1913–14) (Poon Hill Press/Severo Ornstein)

Ornstein soon moved in a very different direction. He began composing works containing dissonant and startling sounds. Ornstein himself was unsettled by the earliest of these compositions: "I really doubted my sanity at first. I simply said, what is that? It was so completely removed from any experience I ever had." On March 27, 1914, in London, he gave his first public performance of works then called "futurist," now known as modernist. (Note: Though today the term "futurist" is closely associated with the art movement that emerged in Italy late in the first decade of the 1900s, it was often used more broadly in the early part of the century to refer to avant-garde art now commonly referred to as "modernist.") In addition to a Busoni arrangement of three Bach choral preludes and several pieces by Schoenberg, Ornstein played a number of his own compositions. The concert caused a major stir. One newspaper described Ornstein's work as "the sum of Schoenberg and Scriabine squared." Others were more analytical: "We have never suffered from such insufferable hideousness, expressed in terms of so-called music."

Ornstein's follow-up performance provoked a near-riot: "At my second concert, devoted to my own compositions, I might have played anything. I couldn't hear the piano myself. The crowd whistled and howled and even threw handy missiles on the stage." The reaction, however, was by no means universally negative—the Musical Standard called him "one of the most remarkable composers of the day ... [with] that germ of realism and humanity which is indicative of genius." By the next year, he was the talk of the American music scene for his performances of cutting-edge works by Schoenberg, Scriabin, Bartók, Debussy, Kodály, Ravel, and Stravinsky (many of them U.S. premieres), as well as his own, even more radical compositions.

Sample from "Wild Men's Dance"

Between 1915 and the early 1920s, when he virtually ceased performing in public, Ornstein was one of the best known (by some lights, notorious) figures in American classical music. In the description of Broyles and Denise Von Glahn, his "draw was immense. He constantly performed before packed halls, often more than two thousand, in many places the 'largest audience of the season.'" His solo piano pieces such as Wild Men's Dance (aka Danse Sauvage; ca. 1913–14) and Impressions of the Thames (ca. 1913–14) pioneered the integrated use of the tone cluster in classical music composition, which Henry Cowell, three years Ornstein's junior, would do even more to popularize. In the description of scholar Gordon Rumson, Wild Men's Dance is a "work of vehement, unruly rhythm, compounded of dense chord clusters ... and brutal accents. Complex rhythms and gigantic crashing chords traverse the whole range of the piano. This remains a work for a great virtuoso able to imbue it with a burning, ferocious energy." Aaron Copland recalled a performance of it as the most controversial moment of his later teen years. In 2002, a New York Times reviewer declared that it "remains a shocker." According to critic Kyle Gann, Impressions of the Thames, "if Debussyan in its textures, used more prickly chords than Debussy ever dared, and also clusters in the treble range and a low pounding that foreshadowed Charlemagne Palestine, yet modulated ... with a compelling sense of unity."

Sample from Sonata for Violin and Piano

As an example of what Ornstein described as "abstract music," his Sonata for Violin and Piano (1915; not 1913 as is often erroneously given) went even further; "to the brink," as he put it: "I would say that [the sonata] had brought music just to the very edge. ... I just simply drew back and said, 'beyond that lies complete chaos.'" In 1916, critic Herbert F. Peyser declared that "the world has indeed moved between the epoch of Beethoven and of Leo Ornstein." That spring, Ornstein gave a series of recitals in the New York home of one of his advocates; these concerts were crucial precedents for the composer societies around which the modern music scene would thrive in the 1920s. Ornstein also traveled to New Orleans in 1916, where he discovered jazz. The following year, critic James Huneker wrote,

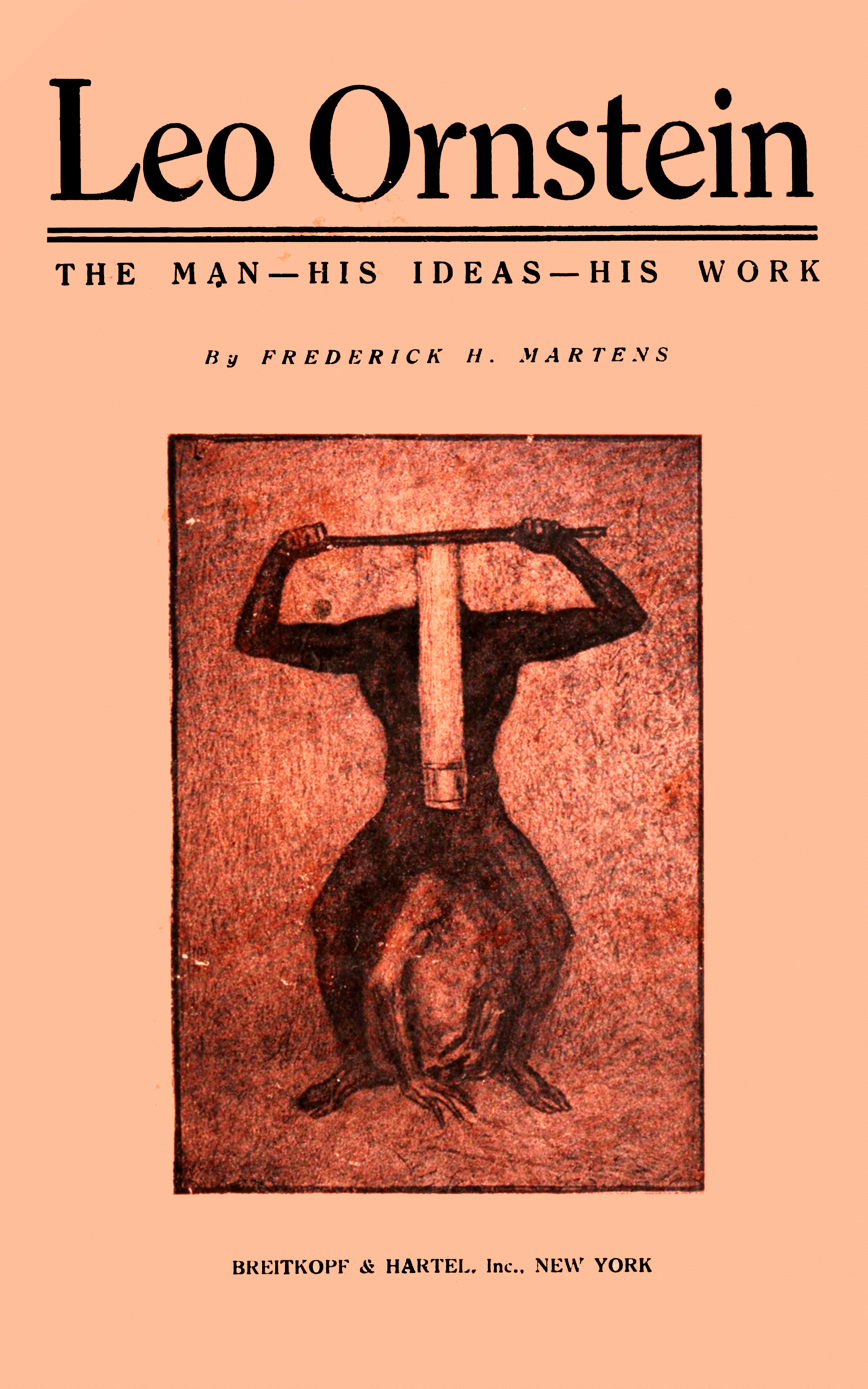
Cover of Leo Ornstein: The Man, His Ideas, His Work (1918), by Frederick H. Martens

I never thought I should live to hear Arnold Schoenberg sound tame, yet tame he sounds—almost timid and halting—after Ornstein who is, most emphatically, the only true-blue, genuine, Futurist composer alive.

In addition to "futurist," Ornstein was also sometimes labeled—along with Cowell and others in their circle—an "ultra-modernist." An article in the Baltimore Evening Sun referred to him as "the intransigent pianist, who has set the entire musical world by the ears and who is probably the most discussed figure on the concert stage." In The Musical Quarterly he was described as "the most salient musical phenomenon of our time." Swiss-born composer Ernest Bloch declared him "the single composer in America who displays positive signs of genius."

By 1918, Ornstein was sufficiently renowned that a full-length biography of him was published. The book, by Frederick H. Martens, suggests not only the level of Ornstein's fame at age twenty-four, but also his divisive effect on the cultural scene:

Leo Ornstein to many represents an evil musical genius wandering without the utmost pale of tonal orthodoxy, in a weird No-Man's Land haunted with tortuous sound, with wails of futuristic despair, with cubist shrieks and post-impressionist cries and crashes. He is the great anarch, the iconoclast.

Sample from Sonata for Cello and Piano

Cowell, who had encountered Ornstein while studying in New York, would pursue a similarly radical style as part of a grand intellectual and cultural mission, which also involved ambitious writings on music theory and publishing and promotional efforts in support of the avant-garde. Ornstein, the vanguard iconoclast of American classical music, followed a much more idiosyncratic muse: "I'm guided entirely by just my musical instinct as to what I feel is consequential or inconsequential." Evidence of that is the fact that, even at the height of his ultra-modernist notoriety, he also wrote several lyrical, tonal works, such as the First Sonata for Cello and Piano: "[It] was written in less than a week under a compulsion that was not to be resisted," Ornstein later said. "Why I should have heard this romantic piece at the same period that I was tumultuously involved in the primitivism of [other works] is beyond my understanding." Commenting on the piece after Ornstein's death approximately three-quarters of a century later, critic Martin Anderson wrote that it "rivals Rachmaninov's [cello sonata] in gorgeous tunes."

"Suicide in an Airplane"
Performed by Takuma Sugawara in 2021

Before the turn of the decade—probably in 1918 or 1919—Ornstein produced one of his most distinctive works involving tone clusters, Suicide in an Airplane. Its score calls for a high-speed bass ostinato pattern meant to simulate the sound of engines and capture the sensation of flight. The piece would serve as an inspiration for the Airplane Sonata (1923) of George Antheil, who reflected Ornstein's influence in other works such as Sonata Sauvage (1923). Writing in 2000, pianist and historian Joseph Smith cited Suicide in an Airplane among those pieces of Ornstein's that "represented (and may still represent) the ne plus ultra of pianistic violence."

== Transition in the 1920s ==
Ornstein, burned out, effectively gave up his celebrated performance career in the early 1920s. His "music was soon forgotten," scholar Erik Levi wrote, leaving him "an essentially peripheral figure in American musical life." As described by Broyles, "Ornstein had mostly retired by the time the new music organizations of the 1920s appeared. Too early and too independent, Ornstein had little desire to participate in the modernist movement by the time it caught hold in the United States. ... [He] seemed little bothered by the publicity or the lack of it. He listened only to his own voice."

Ornstein's primary compositional style was changing as well. As described by latter-day critic Gordon Rumson, his

musical language organised itself into a shimmering, luminous gradation between simplicity and harshness. The melodies have a Hebraic tint, and Ornstein does not shy from placing dissonant and tonal music side by side. This shifting of style is just one of Ornstein's creative tools. More importantly, there is a directness of emotion that makes the music genuinely appealing. It should also be noted that his music is ideally written for the piano and is clearly the work of a master pianist.

This transformation contributed to Ornstein's fade into obscurity. Those whom he had inspired now rejected him, almost as vehemently as the critics he had shocked a decade earlier. "[H]e had been radical modernism's poster boy throughout the 1910s, and when he abandoned that style for one more expressive the ultramoderns reacted as a lover scorned," according to Broyles. "Not even Cowell, known for his accepting temperament, could forgive Ornstein."

Having abandoned not only the concert stage, but also the income that went with it, Ornstein signed an exclusive contract with the Ampico label to make piano rolls. He made over two dozen rolls for Ampico, mostly of a nonmodernist repertoire; the composers he performed most often were Chopin, Schumann, and Liszt. Two rolls contained his own compositions: Berceuse (Cradle Song) (ca. 1920–21) and Prélude tragique (1924). Ornstein never recorded, in any format, even a single example of his futurist pieces which had brought him fame.

Sample from Piano Quintet

In the mid-1920s, Ornstein left New York to accept a teaching post at the Philadelphia Musical Academy, later part of the University of the Arts. During this period, he wrote some of his most important work, including the Piano Concerto, commissioned by the Philadelphia Orchestra in 1925. Two years later, he produced his Piano Quintet. An epic tonal work marked by an adventurous use of dissonance and complex rhythmic arrangements, it is recognized as a masterpiece of the genre.

== Later life ==
Tarantelle
Leo Ornstein plays his 1963 composition Tarantelle

In the early 1930s, Ornstein gave his last public performance. A few years later, he and his wife—the former Pauline Cosio Mallet-Prèvost (1892–1985), also a pianist—founded the Ornstein School of Music in Philadelphia. Among the students there, John Coltrane and Jimmy Smith would go on to major careers in jazz. The Ornsteins directed and taught at the school until it closed with their retirement in 1953. They essentially disappeared from public view until the mid-1970s, when they were tracked down by music historian Vivian Perlis: the couple was spending the winter in a Texas trailer park (they also had a home in New Hampshire). Ornstein had continued to compose music; equipped with a powerful memory, he was not diligent about writing it all down and had not sought to publicize it for decades. Though his style had tempered greatly since the 1910s, it retained its unique character, and with his rediscovery came a new burst of productivity. In Gann's description, piano works composed by Ornstein in his eighties, such as Solitude and Rendezvous at the Lake, featured melodies that "sprang through endless ornate curlicues that brought no other composer to mind."

In 1988, the ninety-two-year-old Ornstein wrote his Seventh Piano Sonata. With this composition Ornstein became, by a couple of years, the oldest published composer, until Elliott Carter, ever to produce a substantial new work. On September 23, 1990, at the age of ninety-four, Ornstein completed his final work, the Eighth Piano Sonata. The names of the sonata's movements reflect not only the passage of a remarkable span of time, but an undimmed sense of humor and exploratory spirit: I. "Life's Turmoil and a Few Bits of Satire" / II. "A Trip to the Attic—A Tear or Two for a Childhood Forever Gone" (a. "The Bugler" / b. "A Lament for a Lost Toy" / c. "A Half-Mutilated Cradle—Berceuse" / d. "First Carousel Ride and Sounds of a Hurdy-Gurdy") (Note: Note that Hyperion's online track listing for Marc-André Hamelin's performance of the Eighth Piano Sonata mistakenly refers to "A Lament for a Lost Boy" and "Sources of a Hurdy-Gurdy"; the liner notes by Anderson (2002b) correctly state "A Lament for a Lost Toy" and "Sounds of a Hurdy-Gurdy.") / III. "Disciplines and Improvisations." Reviewing the work's New York debut, critic Anthony Tommasini wrote, "Between the roaring craziness of the first and third movements, the middle movement is a suite of four short musical musings on childhood mementos discovered in an attic. Though completely incongruous, the shift in tone is audacious and the music disarming. The audience listened raptly, then erupted in applause."

On February 24, 2002, Ornstein died of natural causes in Green Bay, Wisconsin. At the conservatively estimated age of 106, he was among the longest-lived of composers.

== See also ==
- List of solo piano compositions by Leo Ornstein

== Sources ==
- Anderson, Martin (2002a). "Obituary: Leo Ornstein," The Independent (London), February 28.
- Anderson, Martin (2002b). Liner notes to Leo Ornstein: Piano Music (Hyperion 67320) (available online).
- Broyles, Michael (2001). "Ornstein, Leo". Grove Music Online. Revised by Carol J. Oja. Oxford: Oxford University Press. doi:10.1093/gmo/9781561592630.article.20486. ISBN 978-1-56159-263-0. (subscription, Wikilibrary access, or UK public library membership required)
- Broyles, Michael (2004). Mavericks and Other Traditions in American Music. New Haven, Conn., and London: Yale University Press. ISBN 0-300-10045-0
- Broyles, Michael, and Denise Von Glahn (2007). Leo Ornstein: Modernist Dilemmas, Personal Choices. Bloomington: Indiana University Press, 2007. ISBN 0-253-02866-3
- Broyles, Michael, and Denise Von Glahn (2007). Liner notes to Leo Ornstein: Complete Works for Cello and Piano (New World 80655) (available online Archived January 7, 2007, at the Wayback Machine).
- Crunden, Robert Morse (2000). Body and Soul: The Making of American Modernism. New York: Basic Books. ISBN 0-465-01484-4
- Gann, Kyle (2000). "Tri-Century Man," Village Voice, December 19 (p. 136; available online).
- Levi, Erik (2000). "Futurist Influences upon Early Twentieth-Century Music," in International Futurism in Arts and Literature, ed. Günter Berghaus. Berlin: Walter de Gruyter, pp. 322–52. ISBN 3-11-015681-4
- Martens, Frederick H. (1975 [1918]). Leo Ornstein: The Man, His Ideas, His Work. New York: Arno (excerpted online). ISBN 0-405-06732-1
- Mathieson, Kenny (2002). Cookin': Hard Bop and Soul Jazz, 1954–65. Edinburgh: Canongate. ISBN 1-84195-239-7
- Midgette, Anne (2002). "Leo Ornstein, 108, Pianist and Avant-Garde Composer," New York Times, March 5.
- Oja, Carol J. (2000). Making Music Modern: New York in the 1920s. New York and Oxford: Oxford University Press. ISBN 0-19-505849-6
- Ornstein, Severo M. (2002). Liner notes to Leo Ornstein: Piano Sonatas (Naxos 8.559104).
- Perlis, Vivian (1983). "String Quartet No. 3 by Leo Ornstein [recording review]," American Music vol. 1, no. 1, spring (pp. 104–6).
- Pollack, Howard (2000 [1999]). Aaron Copland: The Life and Work of an Uncommon Man. Urbana and Chicago: University of Illinois Press. ISBN 0-252-06900-5
- Porter, Lewis (1999 [1998]). John Coltrane: His Life and Music. Ann Arbor: University of Michigan Press. ISBN 0-472-10161-7
- Rumson, Gordon (2002). "Leo Ornstein (1892–2002)," in Music of the Twentieth-Century Avant-Garde: A Biocritical Sourcebook, ed. Larry Sitsky. New York: Greenwood, pp. 351–57. ISBN 0-313-29689-8
- Smith, Joseph, ed. (2001 [introduction dated 2000]). American Piano Classics: 39 Works by Gottschalk, Griffes, Gershwin, Copland, and Others. Mineola, N.Y.: Courier Dover. ISBN 0-486-41377-2
- Stepner, Daniel (1997). Liner notes to Leo Ornstein: Piano Quintet and String Quartet No. 3 (New World 80509) (available online).
- Tommasini, Anthony (2002). "A Russian Rhapsody With the Power to Jolt," New York Times, March 28.
- Von Glahn, Denise, and Michael Broyles, eds. (2005). Leo Ornstein: Quintette for Piano and Strings, Op. 92. Music of the United States of America (MUSA) vol. 13. Madison, Wisc.: A-R Editions.
