= Wild Men's Dance =

1913 composition by Leo Ornstein

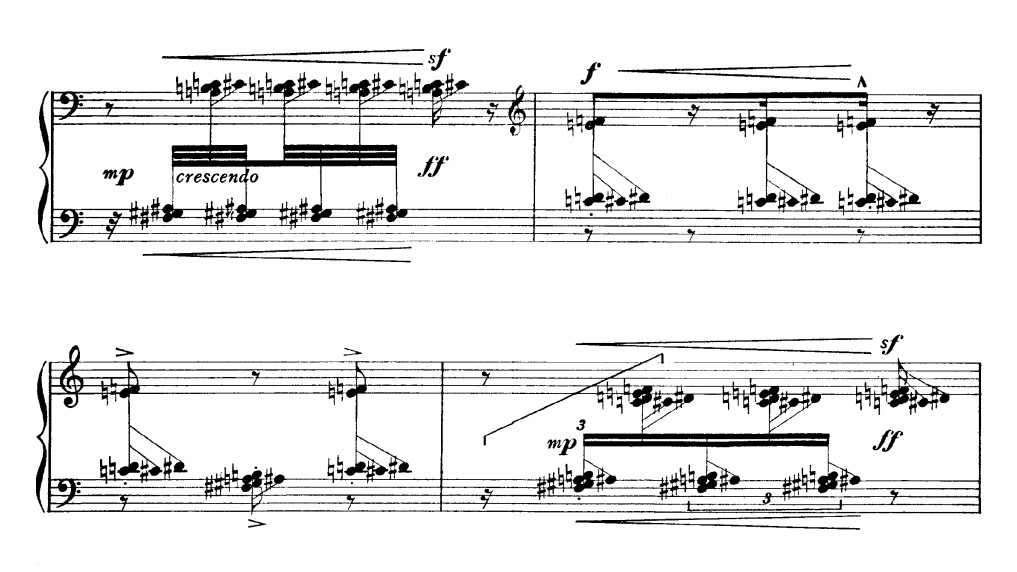
Excerpt from Wild Men's Dance, showing the violent tone clusters prominent throughout the piece.

Wild Men's Dance (aka Danse Sauvage) is a piano work by Russian-American composer Leo Ornstein, dating from either 1913 or 1914. It is widely regarded as the first classical composition to be composed almost entirely of brash tone clusters, predating the "forearm" music of Henry Cowell by a few years. In 1918, critic Charles L. Buchanan described Ornstein's innovation: "[He] gives us masses of shrill, hard dissonances, chords consisting of anywhere from eight to a dozen notes made up of half tones heaped one upon another."

== Composition ==
Sample from "Wild Men's Dance"
Performed by Janice Weber, 2002

Ornstein had begun composing works containing dissonant and startling sounds in the early 1910s. Ornstein himself was unsettled by the earliest of these compositions: "I really doubted my sanity at first. I simply said, what is that? It was so completely removed from any experience I ever had." On March 27, 1914, in London, he gave his first public performance of works under the banner of futurism. Wild Men's Dance was the foremost piece of these concerts.

Music scholar Gordon Rumson would describe Wild Men's Dance as, "a work of vehement, unruly rhythm, compounded of dense chord clusters [...] and brutal accents. Complex rhythms and gigantic crashing chords traverse the whole range of the piano. This remains a work for a great virtuoso able to imbue it with a burning, ferocious energy."
