= Russell and Sigurd Varian =

American brothers

Russell Varian
- Russell Varian photographed by Ansel Adams
- Born: Russell Harrison Varian; April 24, 1898; Washington, District of Columbia, United States
- Died: July 28, 1959 (aged 61); Alaska, United States
- Education: Stanford University (BS, MS)
- Organization: Sierra Club
- Known for: Co-invented the klystron, co-founded Varian Associates
- Spouses: First wife unknown; Dorothy Hill (m. 1947)
- Children: 3
- Parent: John Osborne Varian (father); Agnes Varian (mother)
- Relatives: Sheila Varian (niece)
- Awards: John Price Wetherill Medal (1950)

Sigurd Varian
- Sigurd Varian photographed by Ansel Adams
- Born: Sigurd Fergus Varian; May 4, 1901; Syracuse, New York, United States
- Died: October 18, 1961 (aged 60); One mile offshore of the Pacific Coast of Mexico
- Burial place: Guadalajara, Mexico
- Education: California Polytechnic State University (did not graduate)
- Occupations: Pilot, airplane mechanic, engineer
- Known for: Co-invented the klystron, co-founded Varian Associates
- Spouse: Winifred H. Varian
- Children: 2
- Parent: John Osborne Varian (father); Agnes Varian (mother)
- Relatives: Sheila Varian (niece)
- Awards: John Price Wetherill Medal (1950)

Russell Harrison Varian (April 24, 1898 – July 28, 1959) and Sigurd Fergus Varian (May 4, 1901 – October 18, 1961) were American brothers who founded one of the earliest high-tech companies in Silicon Valley. Born to theosophist parents who helped lead the utopian community of Halcyon, California, they grew up in a home with multiple creative influences. The brothers showed an early interest in electricity, and after independently establishing careers in electronics and aviation they came together to invent the klystron, which became a critical component of radar, telecommunications and other microwave technologies.

In 1948 they founded Varian Associates to market the klystron and other inventions; the company became the first to move into Stanford Industrial Park, the birthplace of Silicon Valley. Both brothers were noted for their progressive political views; Russell was a lifelong supporter of the Sierra Club, Sigurd helped found the housing cooperative of Ladera, California, and Varian Associates instituted innovative employee policies that were ahead of their time. In 1950, the Varians were awarded the John Price Wetherill Medal for the development of the klystron, and both were posthumously inducted into the Silicon Valley Engineering Council Hall of Fame in 1993.

== Childhood ==
The Varian brothers' parents, John and Agnes Varian, were born and raised in Ireland, and were members of the Theosophical Society in Dublin. They emigrated to the United States in 1894, and settled in Syracuse, New York, where they became involved with a theosophical group headed by William Dower. After Dower moved to Halcyon, California, they joined him in 1914, shortly after Halcyon's founding. It was a utopian community that included a sanatorium for the treatment of liquor, morphine, and opium addiction, with socialist leanings and some communal property. John Varian became a leader of the Temple of the People at Halcyon, worked as a chiropractor and masseur, wrote theosophist poetry and socialist tracts, and pursued an interest in Irish myth and history. Agnes was the first Halcyon storekeeper and postmistress.

John and Agnes had three sons, Russell, Sigurd and Eric. The family was not wealthy, but noted in the community for being loving, humorous and adventurous. All three boys exhibited an early fascination with electricity, which included pranks such as attaching electrical outlets to bed springs and door knobs to give visitors minor electric shocks. Russell was named in honor of the poet "Æ", George Russell, whom John had befriended in Ireland. Russell was dyslexic, and in his childhood he was considered by many to be "slow", although later events would demonstrate the true extent of his intellect; Sigurd was the more outgoing of the older two siblings.

Composer Henry Cowell befriended Russell in 1911, when both were in their teens. A piano sonata that Cowell composed for Russell brought Cowell to the attention of John Varian, who, in 1917, asked Cowell to write the prelude for a stage production of John's Irish mythical poetry cycle, The Building of Banba. This piece, titled The Tides of Manaunaun, became Cowell's most famous and widely performed work.

Cowell was also a music tutor of Ansel Adams, and the Varian family in turn became friends with Adams, who became friends with Russell and Sigurd through their mutual activity in the Sierra Club. Adams knew the family for more than 30 years, and was a hiking companion of Russell's; the pair made many trips into the Sierras. Adams later used a line from one of John Varian's poems, "...What Majestic Word", as the title of his 1963 Portfolio Four, which he dedicated to Russell's memory. The portfolio, of which only 200 copies were printed, was narrated with the words of John and Russell Varian, and sold as a fundraiser for the Sierra Club.

== Careers ==
Russell earned bachelor's and master's degrees in physics from Stanford University, compensating for his learning disabilities with what was described as hard work and "sheer force of will". Because of his reading and math difficulties, he took six years to graduate, switching from social sciences to physics. His application to the PhD program at Stanford was rejected. He completed his master's degree in 1927, and went to work at Humble Oil, staying there for five months and receiving a patent for a vibrating magnetometer. Later he went to work in the San Francisco area and was introduced to television technology through a job with Philo Farnsworth.

Sigurd attended California Polytechnic State University, but, mostly owing to boredom, dropped out and never completed a college degree. Through much of his career, Sigurd was periodically ill because of tuberculosis. After a brief stint working for Southern California Edison Company stringing power lines, he took flying lessons and became a pilot, airplane mechanic, and self-taught engineer. He worked as a barnstormer and later as a pilot for Pan American Airways, at a time when the company developed new routes into Latin America. Sigurd was one of the pilots Pan Am selected for their first flights to Mexico and Central America, and while working as an airline captain, he lived in Mexico from 1929 to 1934. From this experience, he discovered many problems with existing maps, finding, for example, that some Mexican charts showed swamps where there were actually mountains. He also realized how difficult it was to land safely or to detect other planes at night or when it was overcast. As a result, he was very familiar with the inadequacies of existing navigational equipment and became interested in ways to make flying safer.

In the early 1930s, in addition to a strong interest in navigation, Sigurd became concerned about the rise of Adolf Hitler in Germany and the political situation in Spain. His experience as a pilot in Central and South America made him particularly aware of the vulnerability of the Panama Canal to enemy attack, as he believed it was relatively simple to fly over a military target at night or in heavy overcast sky in the absence of a defense warning system. Edward Ginzton, who later helped the brothers establish Varian Associates, stated: "[Sigurd] felt that Hitler could easily establish bases in Central America, from which his planes could fly into the United States at night, or at low elevations, and drop bombs, without ever being detected."

=== Working together ===
Sigurd was interested in all-weather navigation systems, and suggested to Russell that together they could create a radio-based technology using microwaves that could detect airplanes at night or in clouds. Russell agreed, and they both quit their jobs, set up their own lab at Halcyon, and began developing plans for a device that could precisely determine the location and direction of an airplane. They initially attempted to create a radio compass, but could not develop a successful design, partly as a consequence of their isolation. They ultimately sought assistance from Russell's college roommate, William Webster Hansen, who was by then a professor at Stanford. With Hansen's help, they came to the attention of the head of the Stanford physics department, David Webster, who hired them in 1936 to work at the university in exchange for lab space, $100 a year for supplies, and an agreement that Stanford University would have half of the royalties for any patents they obtained.

After several rejected models, Russell devised a way to use velocity modulation to allow electrons to flow in bunches and to control their speed. The concept of velocity modulation he used had already been described by A. Arsenjewa Heil and Oskar Heil in 1935, though the Varians were unlikely to have known of the work. The brothers and Hansen ultimately created the klystron, the first tube that could generate electromagnetic waves at microwave frequencies. Russell was responsible for the design and Sigurd built the first prototype, which was completed in August 1937.

The klystron, a microwave tube, was noticed in 1938 by Sperry Gyroscope, who gave the Varian brothers and Hansen a contract to do further work. The Varians did not know that the British were also working on early radar technology, which by then could detect submarines, but could not be made light enough to use in airplanes. Upon publication of a paper in 1939, news of the klystron quickly influenced the work of US and British researchers working on radar technology. Thereafter, klystron equipment was set up in Boston in 1939, and with it, successful blind-landing tests of airplanes were completed. The Varians moved to the East Coast in 1940 to work for Sperry, where wartime development of the microwave tube continued. Though little is known of their work in this period (because they were presumably working on classified projects), it appears that they directed Sperry's vacuum tube and radar work during World War II. The US and Britain were able to use this technology to create radar equipment light and compact enough to fit into aircraft, which was credited with helping the Allies win the war.

=== Post-war ===
The Varian brothers and their associates individually left Sperry and returned to the West Coast between 1945 and 1948. After the war, the klystron became an important component in the further development of radar and the microwave industry. It was used in broadcast television and in the development of various telecommunications technologies. In 1950, the Varians were awarded the John Price Wetherill Medal of the Franklin Institute "in recognition of their foresight ... energy and technical insight in developing ... the klystron". Klystron technology was still being used in 1993 in UHF television, the free-electron laser, and the Stanford Linear Accelerator. Each brother developed other inventions. Russell gained patents for technology related to nuclear magnetic resonance (NMR), as used in magnetic resonance imaging (MRI), thermionic tubes, and various radar technologies. Sigurd's inventions, some of which he patented, included a system of pumps, filters, and heaters for his swimming pool, as well as a high-speed drill press. Sigurd also led projects that built models and prototypes to develop Russell's concepts into usable products. Russell was awarded an honorary Doctor of Engineering degree by the Polytechnic Institute of Brooklyn. He was also named alumnus of the year by California State Polytechnic College for inventing the Klystron.

Today, the Russell Varian Prize, sponsored by Agilent Technologies (Varian, Inc. prior to 2010), honors the memory of Russell Varian and recognizes "innovative contributions of high and broad impact on state-of-the-art NMR technology", and carries with it a prize of €15,000. It is presented annually at EUROMAR, the annual joint conference of the European magnetic resonance scientific community, including the UK Royal Society of Chemistry NMR group, AMPERE Congress, and the European Experimental NMR Conference (EENC). The American Vacuum Society instituted the Russell and Sigurd Varian Award in 1983 for continuing graduate students to honor the Varian brothers.

== Varian Associates ==
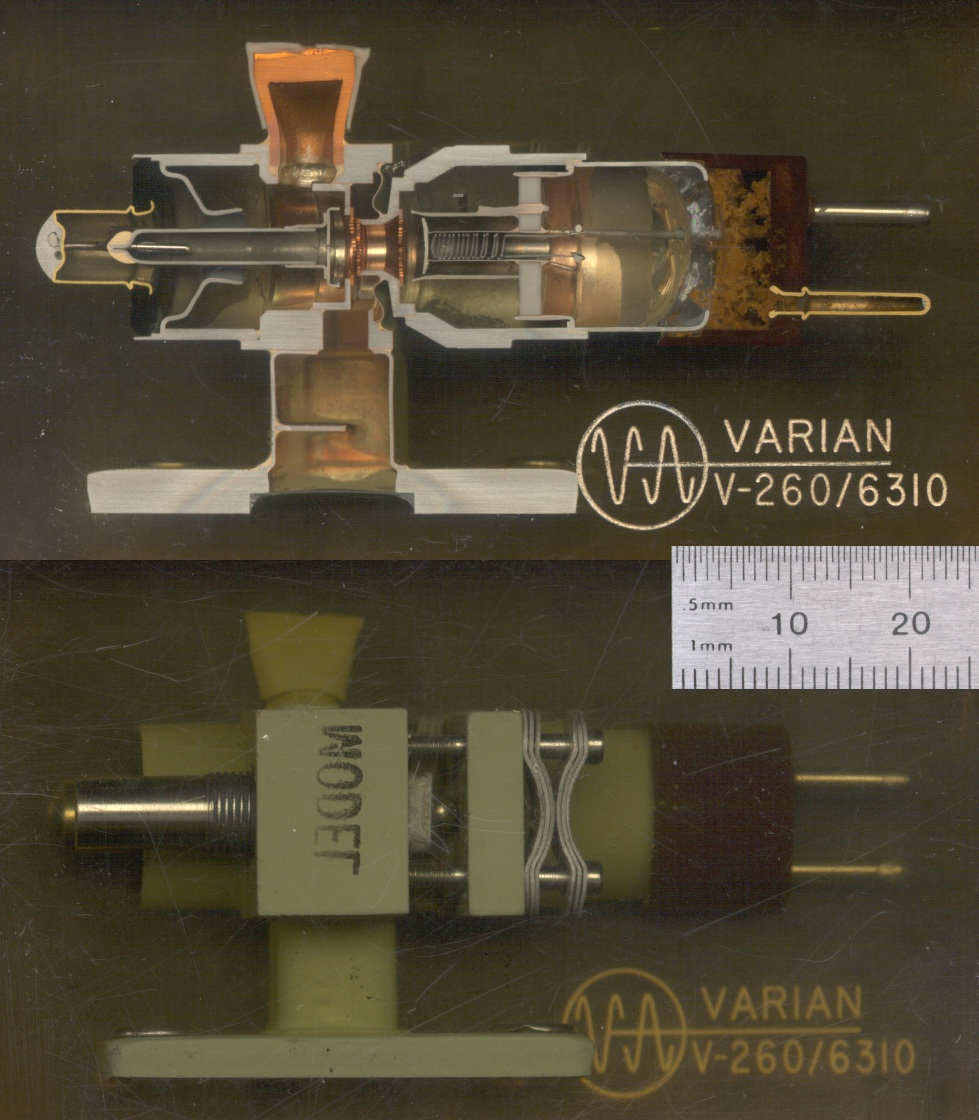
A reflex klystron (1953)

Russell and Sigurd founded Varian Associates in 1948, along with Hansen and Ginzton. They initially created the company to commercialize the klystron and develop other technologies, such as small linear accelerators to generate photons for external-beam radiation therapy. They also were interested in nuclear magnetic resonance technology. Russell's wife, Dorothy, was also active in the development of the company and its operations. The Articles of Incorporation were filed on April 20, 1948, and signed by nine directors: Ginzton, who had worked with the Varian brothers since his days as a doctoral student; Hansen, Richard M. Leonard, an attorney; Leonard I. Schiff, then head of the physics department at Stanford; H. Myrl Stearns, Russell, Dorothy, Sigurd and Paul B. Hunter. The company began with six full-time employees: the Varian brothers, Dorothy, Myrl Stearns, Fred Salisbury, and Don Snow. Technical and business assistance came from several members of the faculty at Stanford University, including Ginzton, Marvin Chodorow, Hansen, and Leonard Schiff. Francis Farquhar, an accountant and friend of Russell's from the Sierra Club, later became a director, as did Frederick Terman, Dean of Engineering at Stanford, and David Packard, of Hewlett-Packard. Russell served as the company president and a board member until his death; Sigurd served as vice president for engineering, and served on the board of directors until his death, sometimes serving as chairman of the board. After the deaths of both Varian brothers, Ginzton became the company's CEO.

The company was initially headquartered in San Carlos, California, and started with only $22,000 in funding. Russell's insistence that the company be owned by its employees and his refusal to accept outside investors led to problems in raising additional capital. Hansen mortgaged his home for $17,000 to raise additional cash, and the group sought out funds from their friends. Ultimately, however, the company raised $120,000 of necessary capital via an offer of stock to all employees, directors, consultants, and a few sympathetic local investors who shared the company's goals. Military contracts for technology deemed necessary during the Cold War, including some classified projects, also helped the firm succeed. In 1953, Varian Associates moved its headquarters to Palo Alto, California, at Stanford Industrial Park – noted as the "spawning ground of Silicon Valley" – and was the first firm to occupy a site there. Several spin-off corporations developed after the death of the Varian brothers; one branch, Varian, Inc., was acquired by Agilent Technologies in May, 2010.

One of Varian Associates' major contracts in the 1950s was to create a fuse for the atomic bomb. The Varian brothers had initially been supportive of military applications for the klystron and other technologies, on the grounds that they were primarily defensive weapons, but this contract was different. Although politically progressive to the point of having socialist leanings, the Varians considered themselves patriotic at heart and had no sympathy for Soviet Marxism. They also needed military contracts to survive, and relished the technical challenges of this type of work. Nonetheless, as early as 1958, Russell and Sigurd expressed regret for their involvement in developing weapons of mass destruction.

Most of the founders of Varian Associates, including Russell and Sigurd, had progressive political leanings, and the company "pioneered profit-sharing, stock-ownership, insurance, and retirement plans for employees long before these benefits became mandatory." Nearly 50 years later, in 1997, the company was still recognized by Industry Week as one of the best-managed companies in America.

In 1998, the Congressional Record noted the 50th anniversary of the founding of Varian Associates, which then employed 7,000 people at 100 plants in nine countries. It had branched out into health care systems, analytical equipment, and semiconductor manufacturing equipment. The company had been awarded more than 10,000 patents. California's 14th congressional district Representative Anna Eshoo called the company a "jewel in the crown of ... Silicon Valley."

== Families and personal lives ==
Russell and Sigurd's brother, Eric Varian, remained in the Halcyon area. He had a career in the central California coast as an electrical contractor, and, beginning in the early 1960s, also assisted the work of his daughter, Sheila Varian, in building a horse ranch, and she became a notable breeder of Arabian horses. Russell's wife Dorothy provided short-term loans that helped support the Varian Arabian horse breeding program in its early years.

=== Russell ===
Russell married twice. From his first marriage, he had a son, George Russell Varian, born on April 22, 1943. Russell's second marriage, in 1947, was to Dorothy Hill. Dorothy, born in 1907, attended UC Berkeley in 1924–28, working odd jobs to pay her tuition, and graduated with a degree in economics. After doing graduate work at Berkeley for a year as a teaching fellow in sales management and market analysis, she made a career for herself in marketing and advertising. An outdoors enthusiast, she enjoyed hiking, and met Russell while on a trip riding burros. The couple adopted two children, Susan Aileen, born Jan 29, 1950, and Charles John, born October 28, 1951. Susan completed a B.A. from UC Davis, studied at Arizona State University and Stanford University, and became a fellow of the Hoover Institution.

Russell was a longtime member of the Sierra Club and, as part of the organization's conservation committee, worked on efforts to acquire land to further the conservation efforts of the organization. In addition, Russell and Dorothy worked to preserve Castle Rock. He was also a member of the League for Civic Unity and the ACLU. He liked to sing Irish ballads learned from his father.

=== Sigurd ===
Sigurd met and married his wife, Winifred, in Mexico. She was the daughter of the British Consul at Vera Cruz. The couple were among the residents of Ladera, a community near Stanford University, which started as a housing cooperative. They had two children: John O. ("Jack") and Lorna. Lorna married Charles Van Linghe, who became a Palo Alto stockbroker, on December 31, 1955. She died on January 26, 2010.

=== Deaths and legacy ===
Both Russell and Sigurd died unexpectedly. Russell died of a heart condition in 1959 on a hiking trip in Alaska. He had been scouting locations that were being considered for national parks. Dorothy continued the couple's conservation work, invigorating the Sempervirens Club as a trust fund to acquire lands for conservation. Her efforts helped establish Castle Rock State Park in 1968. She wrote a biography of Russell and Sigurd, titled The Inventor and the Pilot: Russell and Sigurd Varian, published in 1983. Dorothy died on July 9, 1992.

On October 18, 1961, Sigurd crashed his private plane into the Pacific Ocean while flying from Guadalajara to Puerto Vallarta, after losing his way in darkness. The plane crashed about a mile offshore and his passenger, George Applegate, managed to swim ashore and survived. Sigurd was buried in Guadalajara. He had lived the last three years of his life at Puerto Vallarta. He left an estate worth over $3 million, with one-fourth going to "The Sigurd F. Varian and Winifred H. Varian Charitable Foundation," a chief beneficiary of which was a hospital in Puerto Vallarta. Winifred died suddenly on July 11, 1962. The couple's daughter Lorna had commented that her mother had been very depressed after Sigurd's death.

The Varian family's interest in the conservation of California's natural heritage has been carried on by Sigurd's son, Jack, owner of the V6 Ranch near Parkfield, California, which consists of more than 17,000 acres in two counties. The ranch is entirely protected by a conservation easement that is part of the California Rangeland Trust's Diablo Range Project.

== See also ==
- Continental Electronics, a subsidiary from 1985 to 1990
- Communications & Power Industries, a 1995 spin-off, which includes the Varian brothers' original klystron business
- Intevac, a 1991 spin off
- Varian Data Machines, a former division of Varian Associates that sold minicomputers
- Varian, Inc., a scientific instrument company spun off from Varian Associates in 1999.
- Varian Medical Systems
