= Varian Medical Systems =

American healthcare company

Varian Medical Systems Inc.
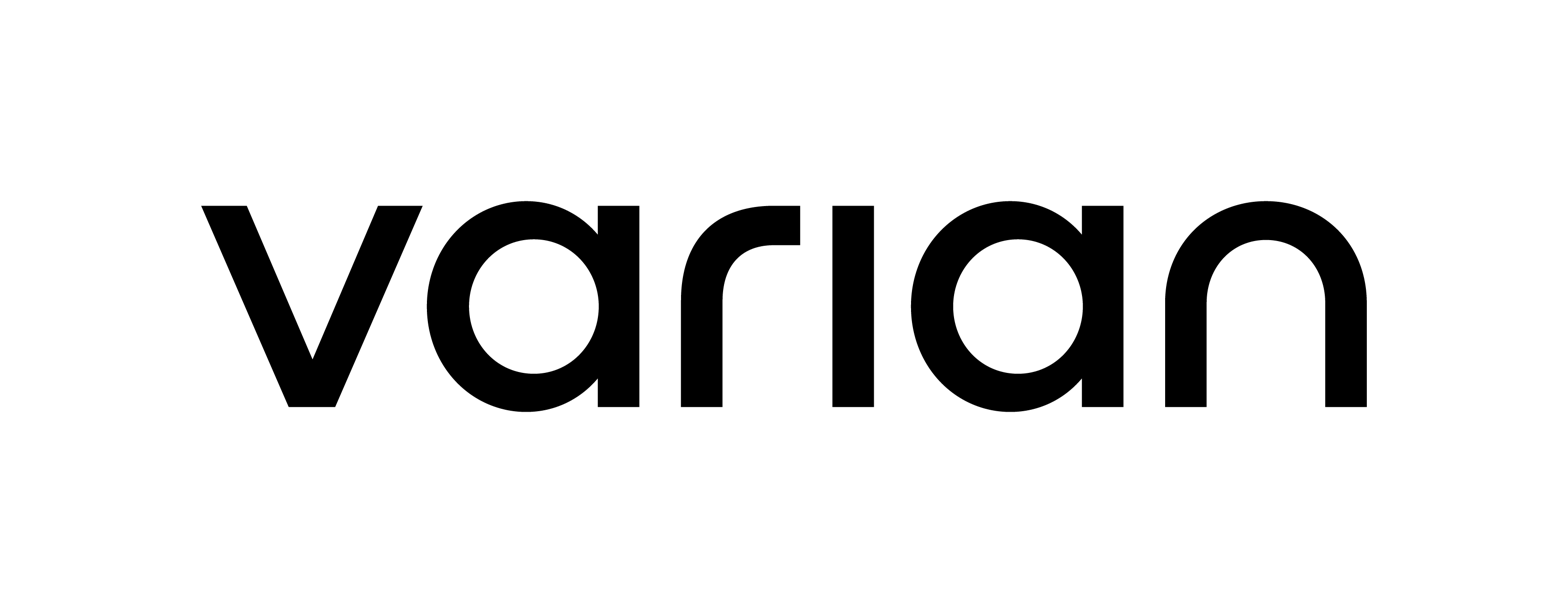

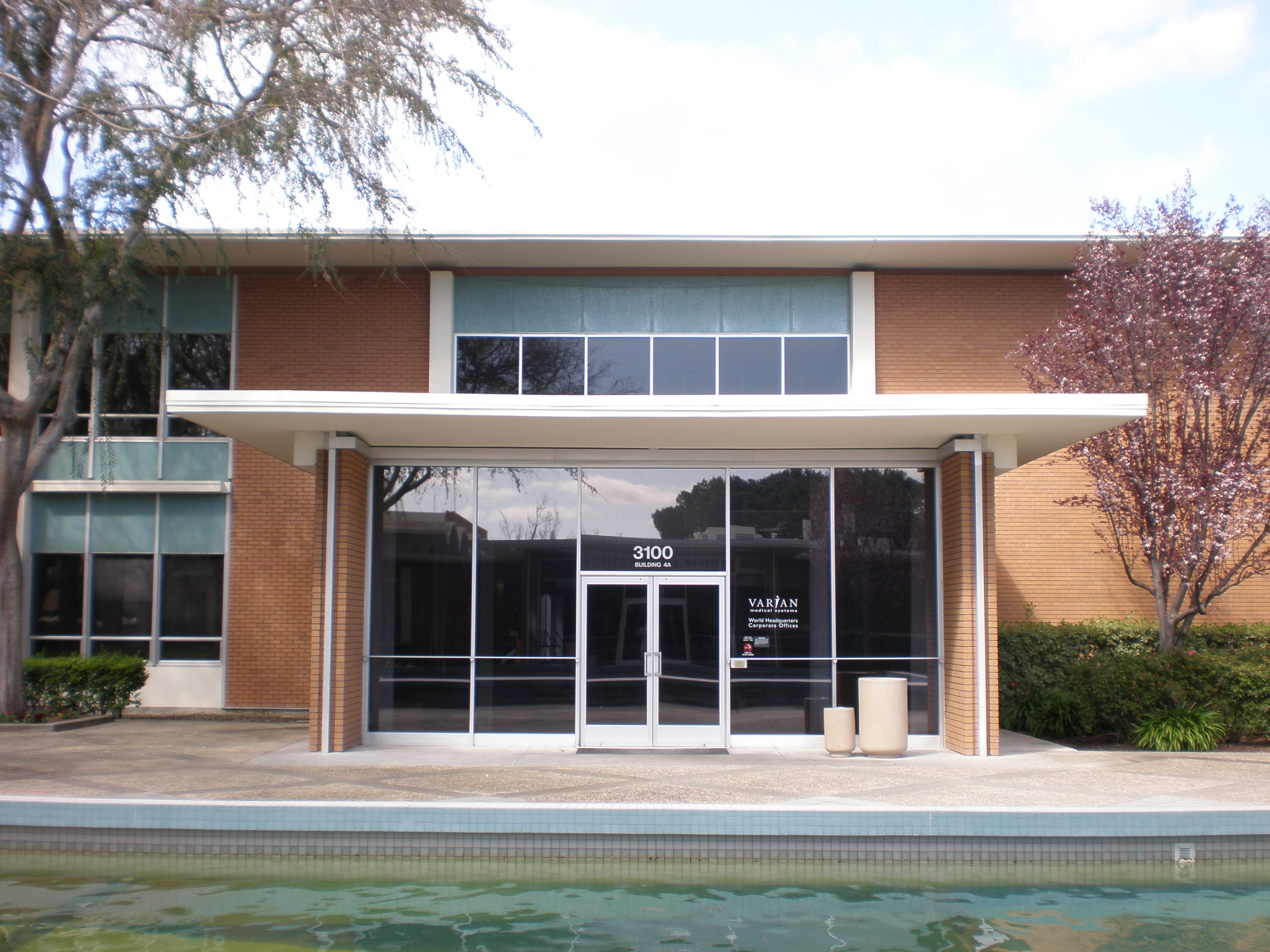
- Varian headquarters in Palo Alto
- Type: Subsidiary
- Industry: Medical Technology
- Founded: 1948; 78 years ago
- Headquarters: Palo Alto, California, U.S.
- Key people: Arthur Kaindl, CEO
- Products: Medical Devices
- Revenue: ▲US$ 2,919.1 million (2018); ▲US$ 2,619.3 million (2017)
- Operating income: ▲US$ 441.6 million (2018); ▼US$ 300.2 million (2017)
- Net income: ▼US$ 150.3 million (2018); ▼US$ 219.2 million (2017)
- Total assets: ▲US$ 3,252.7 million (2018); ▼US$ 3,179.4 million (2017)
- Total equity: ▲US$ 1,588.7 million (2018); ▼US$ 1,499.3 million (2017)
- Number of employees: 10,000
- Parent: Siemens Healthineers
- Website: www.varian.com

Varian Medical Systems is an American radiation oncology treatments and software maker based in Palo Alto, California. Their medical devices include linear accelerators (LINACs) and software for treating cancer and other medical conditions with radiotherapy, radiosurgery, proton therapy, and brachytherapy. The company supplies software for managing cancer clinics, radiotherapy centers, and medical oncology practices. Varian Medical Systems employs more than 7,100 people at manufacturing sites in North America, Europe, and China and approximately 70 sites globally.

In August 2020, Siemens Healthineers announced plans to acquire Varian for $16.4 billion. The deal was completed in April 2021. After the merger Varian continues to operate independently; it retained its headquarters and employees.

== History ==
Varian was founded in 1948 as Varian Associates by Russell H. Varian, Sigurd F. Varian, William Webster Hansen, and Edward Ginzton to sell the Klystron, the first tube which could generate electromagnetic waves at microwave frequencies, and other electromagnetic equipment.

By 1999, Varian Associates had branched into semiconductor, vacuum tube, and medical device fields. On April 2, 1999, these divisions split to become Varian Semiconductor, Varian, Inc., and Varian Medical Systems.

In April 2021, Siemens Healthineers acquired Varian Medical Systems in an all-stock deal valued at $16.4 billion.

=== Acquired companies ===
Before its acquisition by Siemens Healthineers, Varian Medical Systems had acquired other companies, including Pan-Pacific Enterprises, ACCEL Instruments, Bio-Imaging Research, Inc. Sigma Micro Informatique Conseil, Argus Software, Dosetek Oy, Velocity Medical Solutions. and MeVis Medical Solutions AG.

In January 2018, the company announced the acquisition of Sirtex Medical for $1.3 billion.

In 2019, the company acquired CyberHeart, a privately held company with intellectual property (IP) that covers the use of radiation in the heart (cardiac radioablation) and other forms of radiosurgery for cardiovascular disease.

=== Spin-off companies ===
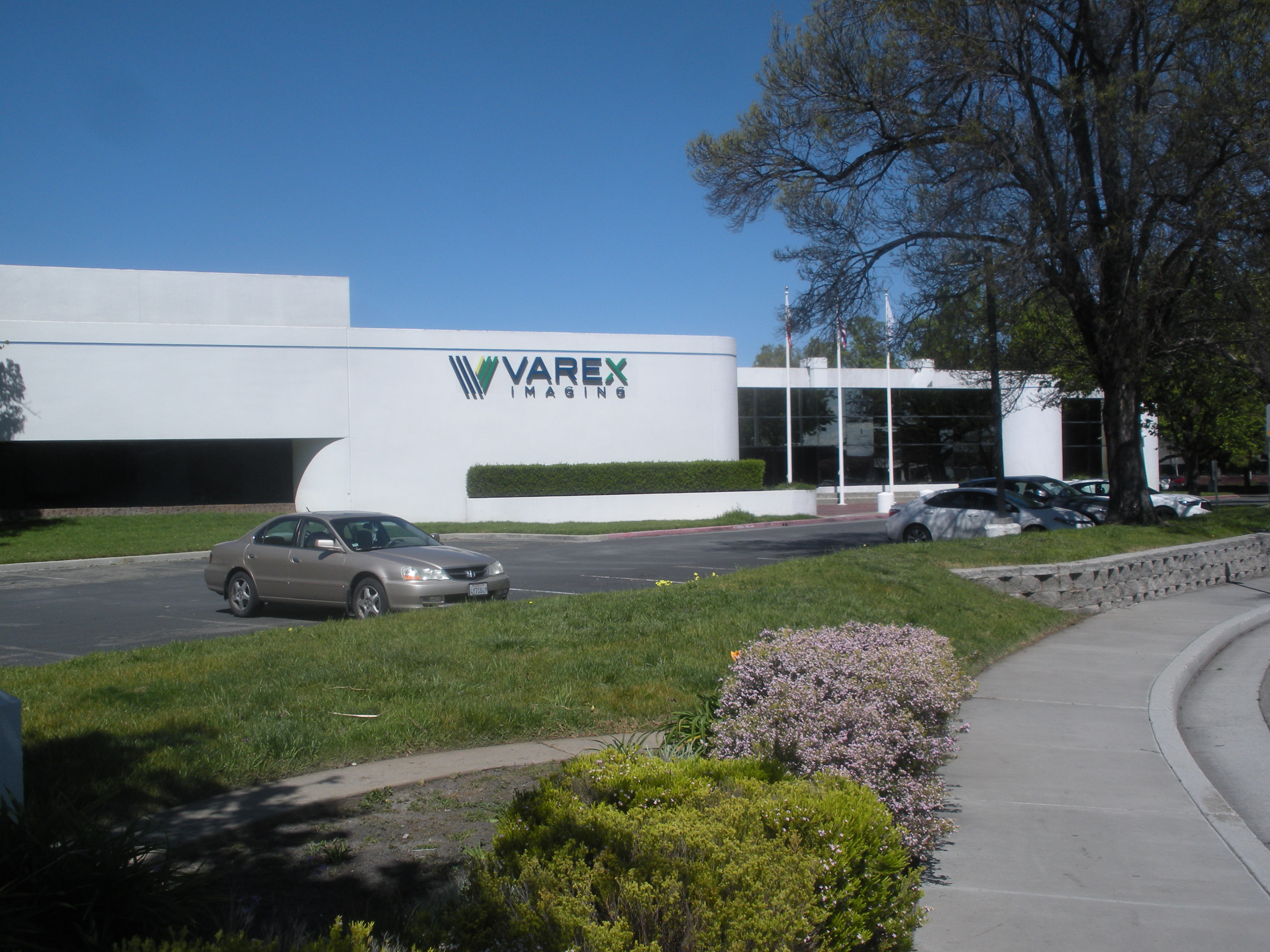
Varex Imaging office in Santa Clara

On January 30, 2017, a spin-off of Varex Imaging Corporation (manufacturing of X-ray imaging products) from Varian Medical Systems had been successfully completed.

== Products ==
=== Linear accelerators ===
Varian manufactures a range of megavoltage LINACs with varying levels of features and complexity, for example different numbers of multileaf collimators or the ability to perform radiosurgery.

TrueBeam is a radiotherapy system.

The EDGE radiosurgery suite was launched in 2012. The first cancer centers to use the new system were the Champalimaud Foundation in Lisbon, Portugal, and Henry Ford Health System in Detroit, Michigan.

=== Halcyon ===
In 2017, Varian launched Halcyon. The system features unique dual-layer MLC that enables high modulation with low leakage for every field or arc. Halcyon is advertised to be intuitive, friendly and comfortable for clinical staff and patient alike. This is primarily done by automating several functions typically performed manually by radiographers, such as switching between treatment beams automatically. Additionally, Halcyon also features an automated machine performance check for daily LINAC quality assurance, which can speed up the checking of beam constancy and mechanical performance through the use of a phantom.

However, while Halcyon does boast improved automation and workflow improvements which allow for faster patient treatment, these extra automation tasks can make occasionally make it more difficult for medical physicists to perform detailed Quality Assurance on LINAC performance. Nevertheless, automation in both quality assurance and clinical operation generally make the LINAC easier to operate by checkers and radiation therapists.

=== Proton Therapy ===
Varian manufactures the ProBeam Proton Therapy System, with current and planned installations at several sites globally. These are an all pencil-beam scanning proton therapy system utilizing IMPT (intensity modulated proton therapy), which was developed with PSI of Switzerland. Varian also develops medical software and radiology information system for proton treatment planning system.

=== Ethos Therapy ===
On September 16, 2019, during the 2019 American Society for Radiation Oncology (ASTRO) annual meeting, being held Sept. 15–18 in Chicago, Varian announced Ethos therapy, an artificial intelligence (AI)-driven system designed to increase the capability, flexibility and efficiency of radiotherapy. This new system is designed to deliver an entire adaptive treatment in a typical 15-minute timeslot, from patient setup through treatment delivery.

== Litigation ==
=== Defamation case law ===
In 1999, Varian Medical Systems, Inc. sued a former employee for defamation after they posted numerous messages criticizing the company on the Internet. The lawsuit led to the ruling of Varian v. Delfino by the California Supreme Court on the question whether a trial could proceed while denial of the defendant's anti-SLAPP motion was under appeal. After the state supreme court ruled that a new trial would be necessary because of that technical concern, the case was settled on undisclosed terms.

=== University of Pittsburgh ===
On April 25, 2012, a US federal judge in Pittsburgh awarded attorney fees, costs, and doubled damages totaling $73.6 million to the University of Pittsburgh after the university won a suit on medical patent infringement grounds against Varian.
