= John Robert Woodyard =

John Robert Woodyard (1904–1981) was an American physicist and electrical engineer who made important contributions to the technology of microwave electronics.

== Life ==
Born in West Virginia and educated in Washington, Woodyard showed an early enthusiasm for radio telegraphy and trained and worked as a radio operator and technician, at sea and on land. In 1928 he enrolled at the University of Washington to study electrical engineering and graduated in 1932. He then pursued an academic career, eventually arriving at Stanford University to work with Russel and Sigurd F. Varian, W. W. Hansen and Edward Ginzton.

With Hansen, he developed the Hansen-Woodyard principle for optimal design of directional antennas. He was awarded his PhD in 1940 and moved, with the rest of Hansen's team, to Sperry Gyroscope Company to work on radar during World War II. Woodyard filed many patents for Sperry, the most significant of which was for the process of "doping" to improve the performance of semiconductors. The demands of war work denied Woodyard the opportunity to pursue this line of research but, post-war, the technique became crucially important in the semiconductor industry and proved the grounds of extensive litigation by Sperry Rand.

In 1945 Woodyard briefly joined Purdue University before appointment at the University of California at Berkeley to work with Luis Walter Alvarez and Wolfgang K. H. Panofsky on the Berkeley proton accelerator.

An enthusiastic and able teacher, he continued to lecture after his retirement in 1971. Woodyard was survived by his wife, Ruth, and two daughters, Alix and Mary Inman.

== Honours ==
- Fellow of the Institute of Electrical and Electronics Engineers, (1963), "For Contributions to Electronic Engineering Education".

== Bibliography ==
- Henriksen, P. W. (1987). "Solid state physics research at Purdue". Osiris. 3: 2nd Ser., 237–260. doi:10.1086/368667. S2CID 143786625.
- Morton, P. L.; et al. (1985). "John Robert Woodyard, Electrical Engineering: Berkeley". University of California: In Memoriam.
