= Leonard I. Schiff =

American physicist (1915–1971)

Leonard Isaac Schiff was born in Fall River, Massachusetts, on March 29, 1915 and died on January 19, 1971, in Stanford, California. He was a physicist best known for his book Quantum Mechanics, originally published in 1949 (a second edition appeared in 1955 and a third in 1968).

== Education ==
Leonard Schiff entered Ohio State University at age 14. Schiff received his B.S. & M.S. (working under L. H. Thomas) from Ohio State University and his doctorate from Massachusetts Institute of Technology in 1937 under Philip M. Morse with thesis Theory of the Collision of Light Elements.

== Career ==
Schiff was a theoretical physicist who, after completing his doctorate, worked as a research associate for two years at the University of California and the California Institute of Technology. From 1940 to 1945 he was a faculty member at the University of Pennsylvania. From 1945 to 1947, he worked at Los Alamos Scientific Laboratory and joined the physics faculty at Stanford University in 1947.

In 1948, Schiff became one of the initial directors of Varian Associates who provided technical support to the company, along with Edward Ginzton, William Hansen, and Marvin Chodorow.

In 1959 and 1960 Schiff and fellow physicist George Pugh wrote papers which advocated using orbiting gyroscopes to test general relativity. Schiff teamed with fellow Stanford faculty Robert Cannon and Bill Fairbank to conduct research that provided part of the foundation for the Gravity Probe B (GP-B) to test Albert Einstein's theory of relativity.

He was the first chairman of the Faculty Senate at Stanford.

== Family ==
Leonard Schiff was the son of Edward and Mathilda Schiff and was of Lithuanian Jewish descent. He married Francis Ballard in 1941. They were the parents of two children: Leonard Schiff and Ellen Schiff. His wife was a cousin of Artemus Ginzton, the wife of Schiff's friend and colleague Edward Ginzton.

== Recognition ==
Schiff became a Fellow of the American Physical Society in 1939. He was elected to membership in the National Academy of Sciences in 1957. In 1966, he received the Oersted Medal of the American Association of Physics Teachers. Also, he received the Dinkelspiel Award for Excellence in Teaching at Stanford University.

Schiff Hall, an undergraduate dormitory at Stanford, is named for him.
