= Marvin Chodorow =

American physicist (1913–2005)

- Born: July 16, 1913; Buffalo, New York, United States
- Died: October 17, 2005 (aged 92); Stanford, California, United States
- Education: University at Buffalo (BA); Massachusetts Institute of Technology (PhD)
- Known for: Klystron development Chodorow potential Acoustic microscope Founding Stanford Applied Physics
- Awards: IEEE Lamme Medal (1982); W.R.G. Baker Award (1962); Fulbright Fellow (1962–1963)
- Scientific career
- Fields: Physics; Microwave electronics Applied physics
- Workplaces: Sperry Gyroscope Company; Stanford University; Varian Associates (consultant)
- Thesis: Examination of a General Method of Calculating Energy Bands of Crystals with Particular Application to Metallic Copper (1939)
- Doctoral advisor: John Slater
- Notable students: Edward Rothwell

Marvin Chodorow (July 16, 1913 – October 17, 2005) was an American physicist who was a pioneer in the development of the klystron microwave tube. His work led to dramatic increases in klystron power output, enabling advances in radar, particle accelerators, satellite communications, and medical devices. He was the founding chairman of the Department of Applied Physics at Stanford University and directed the Ginzton Laboratory for nearly two decades. Chodorow was a member of the National Academy of Sciences, National Academy of Engineering, and American Academy of Arts and Sciences.

== Early life and education ==
Chodorow was born to a Jewish family in Buffalo, New York, on July 16, 1913. He received his BS in physics magna cum laude from the University at Buffalo in 1934. He then attended the Massachusetts Institute of Technology, where in 1936 he met social worker Leah Ruth Turitz, whom he married in 1937. He earned his PhD in physics from MIT in 1939 under the supervision of John Slater. His doctoral thesis introduced what became known as the "Chodorow potential," recognized as a seminal solution of the Schrödinger equation for electrons in metals.

== Career ==
=== Sperry and Varian Associates ===
Chodorow's early career included positions as a research associate at Pennsylvania State College (1940–1941) and physics instructor at the City College of New York (1941–1943). From 1943 to 1947, he worked as a senior project engineer at the Sperry Gyroscope Company, where he collaborated with Russell and Sigurd Varian, Edward L. Ginzton, William Hansen, and others on klystron development. In 1948, this group founded Varian Associates in Palo Alto, California, one of the first companies in what would become Silicon Valley. Chodorow remained a consultant to Varian from its founding until his retirement.

=== Stanford University ===
Chodorow joined Stanford University in 1947 as an assistant professor of physics, becoming associate professor in 1950 and full professor in 1954. Beginning in 1954, he also held a joint professorship in the Department of Electrical Engineering.

From 1959 to 1978, he directed the Microwave Laboratory (renamed the Edward L. Ginzton Laboratory in 1976). He served as executive head of the Division of Applied Physics from 1962 to 1968. In 1968, at the instigation of Chodorow and Hugh Heffner, a separate Department of Applied Physics was created, with Chodorow as its founding chairman. In 1975, he was named the Barbara Kimball Browning Professor of Applied Physics.

During his tenure, Chodorow recruited notable faculty including Arthur Schawlow (who received the 1981 Nobel Prize in Physics) and Calvin Quate (inventor of the atomic force microscope), as well as Arthur Bienenstock, Walter Harrison, and Theodore Geballe.

== Research ==
Chodorow was a major contributor to the development of the klystron tube, a device that generates and amplifies high-frequency electromagnetic waves. Wolfgang K.H. Panofsky, Director Emeritus of the Stanford Linear Accelerator Center (SLAC), credited Chodorow as "the leading figure in transmitting the lore of klystrons [from Sperry] to the Stanford community" and stated that he "deserves most of the credit for the spectacular increase in klystron tube power, which was achieved during the 1940s, from watts to megawatts."

Klystron tubes became essential components for radar systems, particle accelerators, satellite communications, and medical devices. Klystrons developed through Chodorow's work powered the two-mile-long SLAC linear accelerator and medical linear accelerators used to treat an estimated 100,000 cancer patients daily in the United States.

Chodorow also collaborated with professors Calvin Quate and Bertram A. Auld on research in microwave acoustics and quantum electronics, developing an acoustic microscope that uses sound waves to image living cells.

== Publications ==
Chodorow co-authored Fundamentals of Microwave Electronics with Charles Susskind (McGraw-Hill, 1964), a standard text in the field. He authored approximately 40 technical articles and held at least a dozen patents.

== Awards and honors ==
- W.R.G. Baker Award, Institute of Radio Engineers, 1962 (for work on the extended interaction klystron)
- IEEE Lamme Medal, 1982
- Fulbright Fellow, University of Cambridge, 1962–1963
- Lecturer, École Normale Supérieure, Paris, 1955–1956
- Honorary Doctor of Laws, University of Glasgow, 1972
- Member, National Academy of Engineering (elected 1967, "for microwave tube research and development")
- Member, National Academy of Sciences
- Fellow, American Academy of Arts and Sciences
- Fellow, IEEE
- Fellow, American Physical Society

== Personal life ==
Chodorow married Leah Ruth Turitz in 1937. They had two daughters: Nancy Chodorow, a psychoanalyst and sociologist, and Joan Elizabeth Chodorow, an actress. His grandchildren include economist Gabriel Chodorow-Reich.

Chodorow was an active supporter of human rights for exiled Soviet scientists and an advocate for arms control. He served as an advisor to the Office of Naval Research and as a consultant to the U.S. Department of Defense, MIT Lincoln Laboratory, and the RAND Corporation.

He died peacefully at his home on the Stanford campus on October 17, 2005, of natural causes, at age 92.
