= Mary Day =

Mary Day may refer to:

== People ==
- Mary Day (dance teacher) (1910–2006), founder of The Washington Ballet
- Mary Anna Day (1852–1924), American botanist and librarian
- Mary E. Day, in the 2005 Supreme Court opinion Varian v. Delfino
- Mary L. Day (1836–?), American memoirist
- Mary Gage Day (1857–1935), American physician and medical writer
- Mary Louise Day (1968–2017), teenage girl who mysteriously disappeared from her home

== Days ==
- Marian feast days
