= Magnex Scientific =

Former superconductor company

- Type: Inc
- Industry: Science, Research
- Founded: 1982
- Headquarters: Yarnton, Oxford, United Kingdom
- Key people: David Rayner, Managing Director
- Products: Superconducting Magnet Systems
- Website: www.magnex.com

The Magnex Scientific was a company involved in the design and building of superconducting magnet systems. In 2004 Magnex was bought by Varian, Inc.

The Magnet Technology Centre is the new headquarters for magnet manufacturing for Varian, Inc and is situated on the Oxford Industrial Park, 3 miles (4.8 km) north-west of the city of Oxford, England.

The purpose-built manufacturing plant was opened in 2000, and has since grown in size to 90,000 square feet (8,400 m^{2}). Part of this expansion is the new Varian European NMR demonstration facility. The factory is able to manufacture Varian's full range of on NMR and MRS magnet systems including the class leading ultra high-field 9.4 T 900 mm and 7.0 T 900 mm horizontal bore MRI magnets as well as high resolution 800 MHz NMR magnet systems.

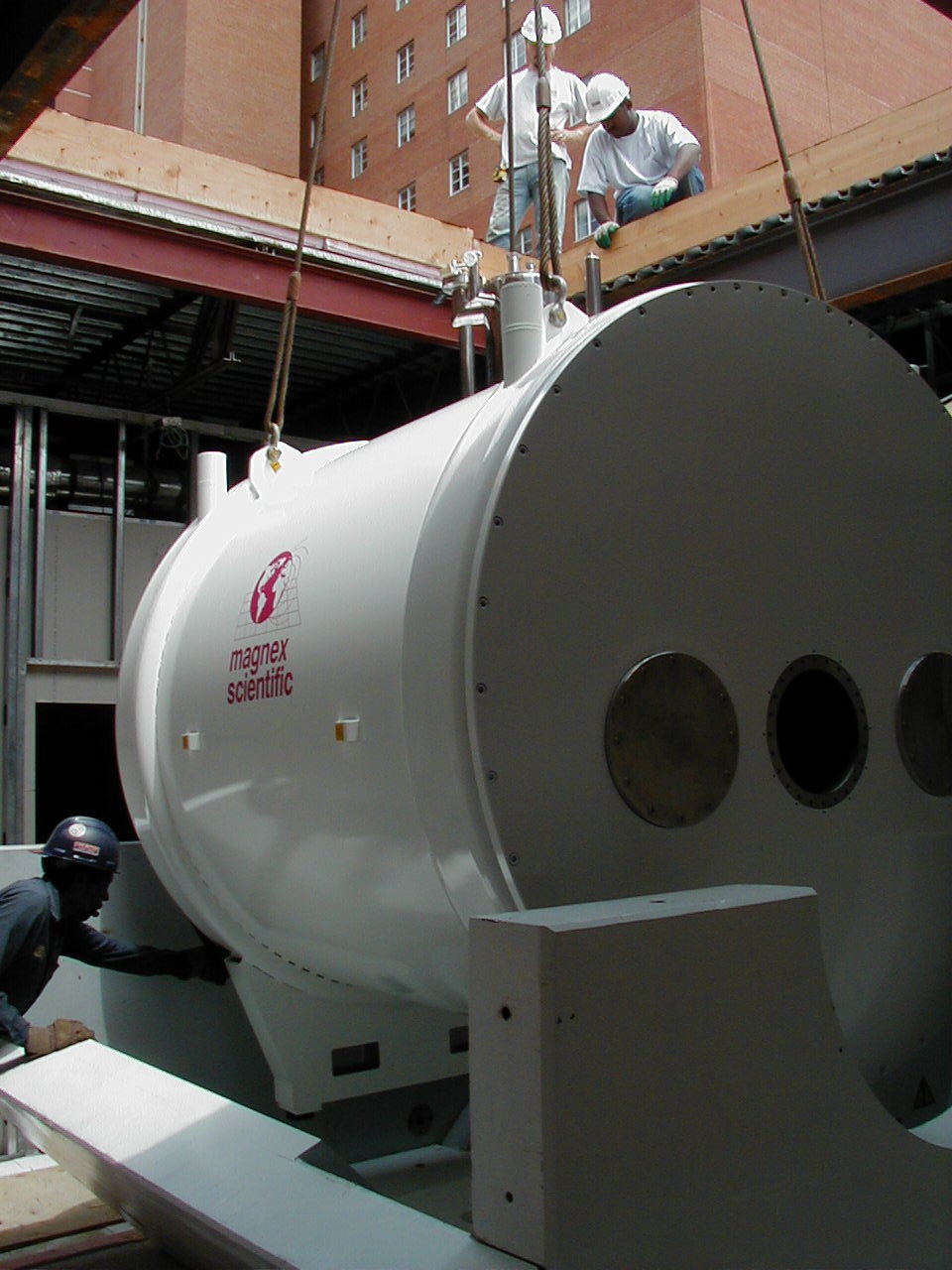
Installation of a Magnex Scientific MRI unit.

== Magnex history ==
Since 1982 Magnex has grown to become the World Leader in NMR Magnet Technology. Below is a brief description of the last 25 successful years

1982 Magnex Formed

1983 First Whole Body 0.5 tesla MRI Magnet System produced for Elscint Ltd.

1984 First Whole Body 2.0 tesla MRI/MRS Magnet System produced for Elscint Ltd.

1985 Magnex moves to Abingdon Business Park

Magnex develops World's first 4.7 tesla 400 mm Horizontal Bore Magnet System for Bruker GmbH

1986 Magnex develops the first Super Wide-Bore 400 MHz High Resolution Magnet System (400 MHz 104 mm)

1987 Full range of Horizontal Bore Spectroscopy Magnet Systems developed (2.0-7.0 tesla, 20–40 cm bore)

1988 Magnex develops the World's first compact 3.0 tesla 800 mm Shielded MRS Magnet System for Henry Ford Hospital Detroit

1989 Magnex Inc established

Magnex develops 500 MHz High Resolution Magnet Systems

1990 Magnex develops 600 MHz High Resolution Magnet Systems

1991 Delivery and installation of Magnex's first 600 MHz 54 mm and 500 MHz 89 mm High Resolution Magnet Systems

1992 Delivery and installation of the World's first 550 MHz Wide-Bore(89mm) High Resolution Magnet System

Delivery of Magnex's first compact 1.5 tesla MRI Magnet System

1993 Magnex develops and install the World's first 9.4 tesla 310 mm Horizontal bore Spectroscopy Magnet System

Delivery and installation of the World's first 7.0 tesla 400 mm Horizontal Bore Spectroscopy Magnet System

Delivery of Magnex's first Compact Active Screen 0.5 tesla MRI Magnet System

1994 Delivery and installation of the first Magnex/JMT 750 MHz 54 mm Magnet System at an Academic Institute (in conjunction with Bruker)

Delivery and installation by Magnex of the World's first Super-Wide Bore 500 MHz/125mm High Resolution Magnet System

Installation of the World's first dedicated fMRI Magnet System (3.0 teslas) at Pittsburgh with GE Medical Systems

1995 Completion of the World's first Actively Shielded High Resolution Magnet Systems

Delivery of the World's first 750 MHz 62 mm Magnet System

Delivery of the World's first compact Shielded FTMS Magnet System

1996 Delivery of the World's first Actively Shielded 600 MHz 52 mm Magnet System

1997 Delivery of the World's first 800 MHz 52 mm Magnet System operating at 4.2 K

1998 Delivery of the World's first ultra high field (8 T) clinical research magnet.

1999 Delivery of the World's second ultra high field (7 T) clinical research magnet.

Delivery of Europe's highest field (4.7 T) clinical research magnet.

2000 Delivery and installation of the world's first actively shielded 500 MHz 125 mm high resolution magnet system.

Delivery of the World's first 500 MHz 40 cm Horizontal bore Magnet System.

Sale of clinical business to GE Medical Systems.

2001 Relocated to The Magnet Technology Centre, Yarnton UK

Demonstration of the World's first 7.0 tesla 600 mm Vertical Bore fMRI Magnet System

2002 Installation of the company's 500th NMR/MRI Magnet System.

Completion of the World's first 12.0 tesla actively shielded FTMS Magnet System.

2003 Installation of World's first actively shielded 600 MHz 89 mm bore magnet system.

Delivery of the world first 9.4 T 65 cm research magnet.

2004 Delivery and installation of the world's first 800 MHz 89 mm Magnet System.

Varian, Inc. acquisition of Magnex Scientific.

2005 Delivery of Premium Shielded 500 MHz and 600 MHz magnets

2006 Introduction of 9.4/820 and 7T/680 actively shielded clinical MRI systems. European MR Application’s lab opened in B4

2007 Introduction of 16.4T/260 and 14.1/260 in-vivo MRS systems

2008 Introduction of PremiumCOMPACT 800MHz NMR magnet. Shipment and commissioning of World’s first 9.4 Tesla/900mm MRI magnet
