= Frederick Terman =

American educator and academic administrator (1900–1982)

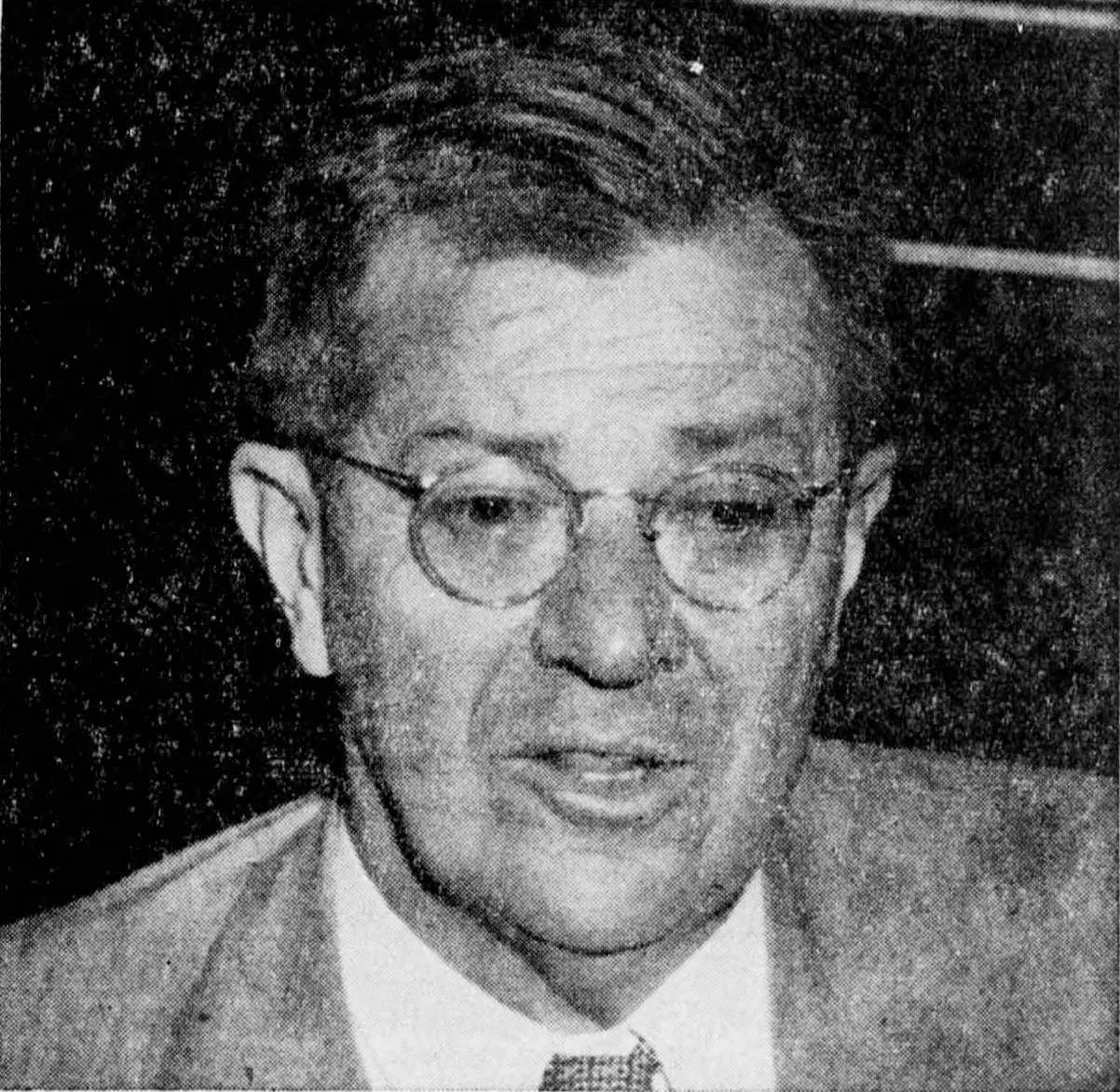
- Terman in 1955
- Born: Frederick Emmons Terman; June 7, 1900; English, Indiana, U.S.
- Died: December 19, 1982 (aged 82); Palo Alto, California, U.S.
- Education: Stanford University (BS, MS); Massachusetts Institute of Technology (DSc)
- Awards: IEEE Medal of Honor (1950); IEEE James H. Mulligan, Jr. Education Medal (1956); IEEE Founders Medal (1963); National Medal of Science (1975)
- Scientific career
- Fields: Electrical engineering
- Workplaces: Stanford University; Massachusetts Institute of Technology
- Doctoral advisor: Vannevar Bush
- Notable students: Bill Hewlett; Bernard M. Oliver; David Packard; Wen-Yuan Pan; Russell and Sigurd Varian; Oswald Garrison Villard Jr. Paul W. Klipsch

Frederick Emmons Terman (/ˈtɜːrmən/; June 7, 1900 – December 19, 1982) was an American professor and academic administrator. He was the dean of the school of engineering from 1944 to 1958 and provost from 1955 to 1965 at Stanford University. He is widely credited (together with William Shockley) as being the father of Silicon Valley.

In 1951 he spearheaded the creation of Stanford Industrial Park (now Stanford Research Park), whereby the university leased portions of its land to high-tech firms. Companies such as Varian Associates, Hewlett-Packard, Eastman Kodak, General Electric, and Lockheed Corporation moved into Stanford Industrial Park and made the mid-Peninsula area into a hotbed of innovation which eventually became known as Silicon Valley.

== Early life and education ==
Terman was born to Lewis Terman and Anna Belle Minton Terman on June 7, 1900, in Indiana, U.S. His father, Lewis Terman, was a eugenicist and a psychologist who studied gifted children and popularized the IQ test in America as a professor at Stanford University. His mother attended Central Normal College and taught English at a school nearby. In 1895 she met Lewis Terman at the school; the relationship developed over the following years, culminating in marriage on Sept. 15, 1899. They then followed Lewis' education at Indiana University and Clark University.

At the age of 10, Terman arrived at Stanford when his father joined the psychology faculty. As a boy, his favorite hobby was ham radio.

== Education ==
Terman completed his undergraduate degree in chemistry and his master's degree in electrical engineering at Stanford University. He went on to earn an ScD in electrical engineering from Massachusetts Institute of Technology in 1924 where his advisor was Vannevar Bush, who first proposed what became the National Science Foundation.

== Academic career ==
Terman returned to Stanford in 1925 as a member of the engineering faculty. From 1925 to 1941 Terman designed a course of study and research in electronics at Stanford that focused on work with vacuum tubes, circuits (electrical network), and instrumentation. Terman received tenure at Stanford by having the administration match his tenure offer at Cornell University. He hired Charles Litton and Karl Spangenberg, a student of William Littell Everitt. Together they established a vacuum tube laboratory. He also wrote Radio Engineering (first edition in 1932; second edition, much improved, in 1937; third edition in 1947 with added coverage of new technologies developed during World War II; fourth edition in 1955 with a new title, Electronic and Radio Engineering), one of the most important books on electrical and radio engineering, and to this day a good reference on those subjects. Terman's students at Stanford included Oswald Garrison Villard, Jr., Russell and Sigurd Varian, William Hewlett, and David Packard. He encouraged his students to form their own companies and personally invested in many of them, resulting in firms such as Litton Industries, Varian Associates, and Hewlett-Packard. Terman was president of the Institute of Radio Engineers in 1941.

=== War years ===
During World War II, Terman directed a staff of more than 850 at the Radio Research Laboratory at Harvard University. This organization was the source of Allied jammers to block enemy radar, tunable receivers to detect radar signals, and aluminum strips ("chaff, window") to produce spurious reflections on enemy radar receivers. These countermeasures significantly reduced the effectiveness of radar-directed anti-aircraft fire.

=== Stanford Research Park and Silicon Valley ===
After the war, Terman returned to Stanford and was appointed dean of the School of Engineering. In 1945 he was influential in the creation of a microwave research laboratory at the Stanford School of Physical Sciences. In 1951 he spearheaded the creation of Stanford Industrial Park (now Stanford Research Park), whereby the university leased portions of its land to high-tech firms. Companies such as Varian Associates, Hewlett-Packard, Eastman Kodak, General Electric, and Lockheed Corporation moved into Stanford Industrial Park and made the mid-Peninsula area into a hotbed of innovation which eventually became known as Silicon Valley.

He served as provost at Stanford from 1955 to 1965. During his tenure, Terman greatly expanded the science, statistics and engineering departments in order to win more research grants from the Department of Defense. These grants, in addition to the funds that the patented research generated, helped to catapult Stanford into the ranks of the world's first class educational institutions, as well as spurring the growth of Silicon Valley. Terman's efforts to create a mutual relationship between Stanford and the tech companies in the surrounding area also significantly contributed to this growth. Speaking of this effort, Terman said

When we set out to create a community of technical scholars in Silicon Valley, there wasn't much here and the rest of the world looked awfully big. Now a lot of the rest of the world is here.

— Frederick Terman

In 1964, Terman became a founding member of the National Academy of Engineering. In 1966 Terman played a central role in helping the Park Chung Hee Administration establish the Korea Advanced Institute of Science, which later became KAIST. Terman Hall at KAIST was named in his honor in 2004.

== Recognition ==
President Gerald Ford (right) presenting the National Medal of Science to Terman, October 1976.

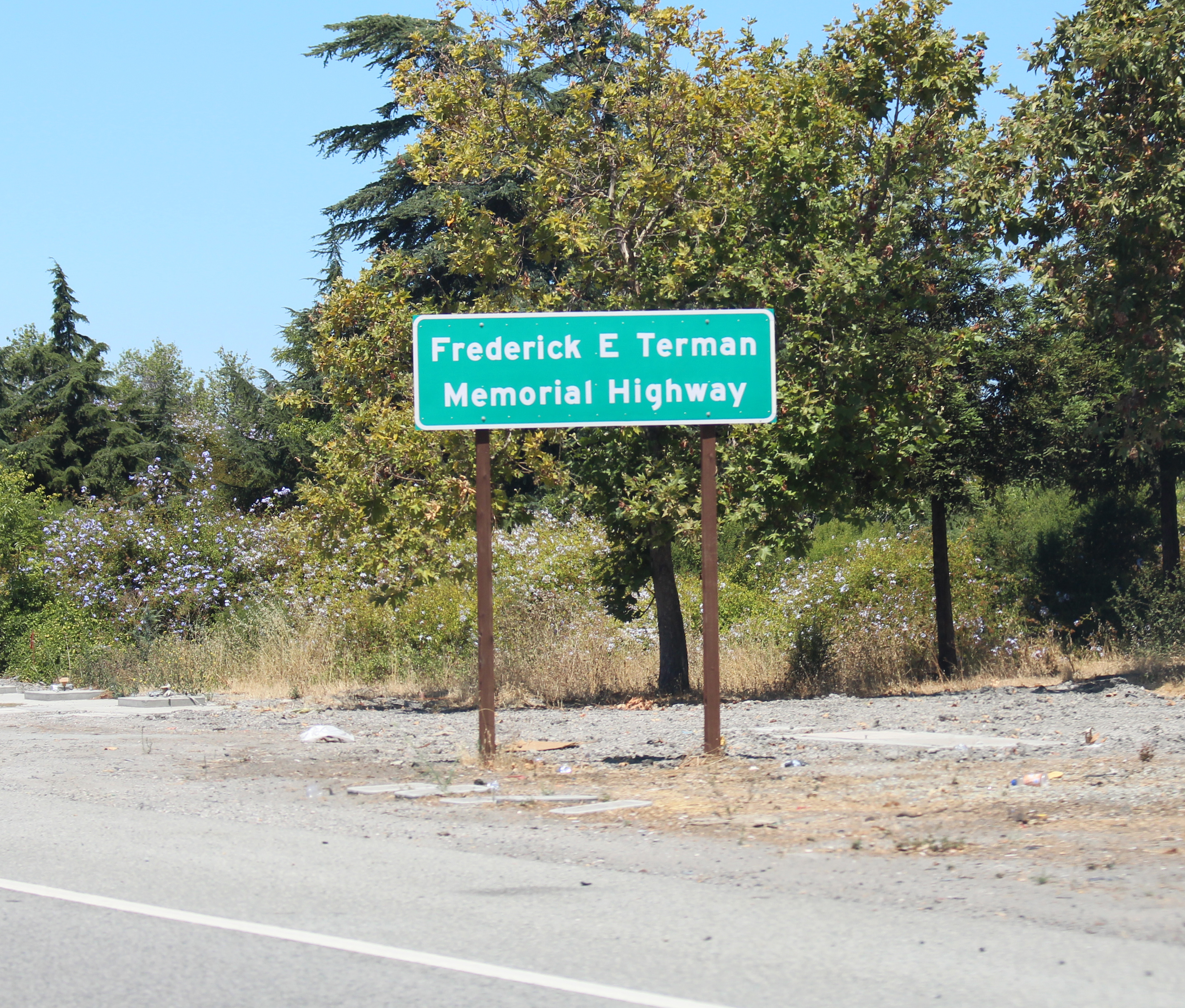
Roadside sign on U.S. Route 101 for the Frederick E. Terman Memorial Highway

- He was awarded the IRE Medal of Honor in 1950 for "his many contributions to the radio and electronic industry as teacher, author, scientist and administrator".
- He was an elected member of the American Academy of Arts and Sciences, the United States National Academy of Sciences, and the American Philosophical Society.
- The Frederick Emmons Terman Award was established in 1969 by the American Society for Engineering Education, Electrical and Computer Engineering Division. It is sponsored by Hewlett-Packard and is bestowed annually upon an outstanding young electrical engineering educator.
- The Frederick Emmons Terman Engineering Scholastic Award is presented to the students that rank academically in the top five percent of the graduating senior class from the Stanford University School of Engineering.
- Stanford's Terman Engineering Center (1977–2011) was named in his honor.
- Terman Middle School in Palo Alto, California, and the adjacent Terman Park were named after Terman and his father. In 2018, the Palo Alto Unified School District school board unanimously decided to rename the school in honor of Ellen Fletcher after Terman's father's involvement with the eugenics movement came to the notice of parents and the school board. At the time of the renaming of the middle school, the city of Palo Alto had yet to decide if they would also rename the adjacent park.
- A section of U.S. Route 101 in California near Palo Alto is officially designated and signed as the Frederick E. Terman Memorial Highway.
- A road on the Tektronix Campus in Beaverton, Oregon is named after him.

== Sources ==
- Gillmor, C. Stewart (2004). Fred Terman at Stanford: Building a Discipline, a University, and Silicon Valley. Stanford University Press. ISBN 0-8047-4914-0.
