= CPI International =

American satellite communications and radio-frequency equipment manufacturer

Communications & Power Industries
- Trade name: CPI
- Type: Private
- Industry: Satellite communications; radio-frequency engineering; aerospace and defense
- Predecessor: Electron Devices Business of Varian Associates
- Founded: 1995
- Headquarters: Plano, Texas, United States
- Key people: Andrew C. Ivers (president and CEO)
- Products: Satellite antennas; radio-frequency amplifiers; radomes; composite structures; medical imaging generators
- Owner: TJC L.P.
- Number of employees: Approximately 1,200 (August 2026)
- Website: www.cpii.com

Communications & Power Industries (CPI) is an American manufacturer of satellite communications, microwave, radio-frequency (RF), and related equipment for government and commercial customers. Its products include large earth station antennas, satellite communications amplifiers, radomes, composite structures, and equipment for medical imaging. The company is headquartered in Plano, Texas, and has manufacturing and engineering operations in the United States, Canada, Estonia, Germany, and India.

The business was established in 1995 when Varian Associates sold its electron-device operations to an investor group led by Leonard Green & Partners and members of management. CPI International, Inc. was a holding company for the operating business and traded on the Nasdaq stock market under the ticker CPII from 2006 until a private-equity acquisition in 2011. CPI subsequently expanded into satellite antennas and composite structures through acquisitions. In 2024, it sold its original electron-device business to TransDigm Group for approximately US$1.385 billion, while retaining its communications and other equipment operations.

CPI has been owned by private-equity firm TJC L.P. (formerly The Jordan Company) since October 2022.

== History ==
=== Origins and formation ===
CPI traces its industrial origins to the electron-device business of Varian Associates, established in 1948 by Russell and Sigurd Varian. The Varian brothers had developed the klystron, a vacuum tube used to generate or amplify microwave signals. Varian Associates subsequently manufactured a range of vacuum electron devices for radar, communications, broadcasting, medical, and scientific applications. Its operations also incorporated the Eimac business, a manufacturer of transmitting tubes.

In 1995, Varian Associates sold its electron-device business to Leonard Green & Partners and participating managers, who established Communications & Power Industries. The company initially concentrated on microwave tubes, traveling-wave tubes, klystrons, and high-power RF products used in radar, telecommunications, broadcasting, and medical equipment.

=== Corporate restructuring and public listing ===
In January 2004, CPI Acquisition Corp., a company controlled by affiliates of the Cypress Group, acquired the predecessor holding company, Communications & Power Industries Holding Corporation. The acquiring entity was renamed CPI Holdco and, in January 2006, CPI International, Inc. The operating business remained Communications & Power Industries.

CPI International's shares began trading on Nasdaq on April 28, 2006, under the symbol CPII. The initial public offering closed on May 3, 2006, at US$18 per share. CPI International sold approximately 2.9 million new shares, while existing shareholders sold approximately 4.1 million shares; the company used its proceeds to reduce debt. Before the offering, financial research firm Renaissance Capital described CPI as a supplier of microwave and radio-frequency equipment for defense and other applications.

In February 2011, an affiliate of Veritas Capital acquired CPI International for US$19.50 per share in a transaction valued at approximately US$525 million, taking the company private and ending its Nasdaq listing.

In July 2017, Odyssey Investment Partners acquired the company from Veritas. At the time of the transaction announcement, CPI reported approximately US$495 million in fiscal 2016 sales and about 1,900 employees.

TJC announced an investment in CPI in April 2022 and completed its acquisition in October that year, succeeding Odyssey as owner. Andrew C. Ivers succeeded Robert Fickett as chief executive officer in 2023; Fickett became executive chairman.

=== Expansion into satellite communications and composite structures ===
Beginning in the 2000s, CPI diversified beyond the vacuum tubes on which it had been founded. It acquired Econco, a remanufacturer of power-grid tubes, in 2004, and the antenna manufacturer Malibu Research Associates in 2007. In 2012, CPI acquired the Codan Satcom business to expand its solid-state satellite communications products.

In 2013, CPI acquired M C L, Inc., a supplier of satellite communications power amplifiers, and Radant Technologies, a manufacturer of radomes, reflector antennas, and aerospace composite structures. The Radant acquisition expanded CPI's activities in protective structures for antennas used on aircraft, ships, and ground installations.

CPI acquired ASC Signal in 2015, adding large satellite communications antennas, and purchased Orbital Systems and Quorum Communications in 2018, adding tracking antenna systems used for communication with satellites in low Earth orbit.

In June 2020, CPI completed its US$175 million acquisition of the SATCOM Technologies antenna systems business from General Dynamics. The acquired business included large satellite ground-station antennas and associated RF equipment. The United States Department of Justice challenged the proposed transaction on antitrust grounds, arguing that CPI's ASC Signal division and General Dynamics SATCOM Technologies were the two significant U.S. suppliers of certain large antennas for geostationary satellite systems. A settlement required CPI to divest ASC Signal as a condition of proceeding with the acquisition. Later that month, Kratos Defense & Security Solutions agreed to buy ASC Signal for US$35 million.

The company continued acquiring businesses in adjacent markets. In 2021 it acquired TMD Technologies, a British-American manufacturer of microwave devices and transmitters, and ESSCO, a former L3Harris Technologies business manufacturing large ground-based radomes. In 2022 CPI acquired Colorado-based AdamWorks, a producer of composite aircraft structures and radomes.

=== Sale of the electron-device business ===
In November 2023, TransDigm Group announced an agreement to buy CPI's Electron Device Business. The transaction, valued at approximately US$1.385 billion in cash, was completed on June 6, 2024. The sold business comprised operations including the Beverly Microwave, Microwave Power Products, Econco, and TMD divisions, which supplied microwave devices and other electronic components, primarily for aerospace and defense applications. TransDigm reported that the business had generated about US$300 million in sales in fiscal 2023.

The sale underwent national-security review in the United Kingdom. In February 2024, the UK government approved the transaction subject to a condition intended to retain British research and manufacturing capabilities related to atomic-clock technology, which had been under development within TMD.

The divested business continued under the name CPI Electron Device Business, separate from the CPI communications and antenna group. The transaction marked a change from CPI's original focus on vacuum-electron devices toward antennas, amplifiers, radomes, and related communications systems.

== Operations and products ==
Following the 2024 divestiture, CPI's principal product categories include antenna systems, RF power amplifiers, composite structures and radomes, and power electronics for medical imaging and other applications. Its customers operate in defense, commercial communications, medical, industrial, and scientific markets.

=== Antennas and satellite ground systems ===
CPI produces fixed and mobile satellite antennas, including large-aperture earth station systems, very-small-aperture terminal (VSAT) antennas, and systems for satellite telemetry, tracking, and command. Its antenna businesses also supply radar antennas, antenna controllers, and associated tracking and receiving equipment. These products are used in government, military, commercial satellite communications, and scientific facilities.

=== RF amplifiers and power electronics ===
The company's satellite communications product range includes solid-state RF power amplifiers, tube-based amplifier systems, and associated equipment used to transmit and receive microwave signals. CPI also offers medical imaging generators and related power electronics. Its product portfolio encompasses equipment for both ground-based satellite links and other RF applications; the 2024 divestiture separated the manufacture of many electron devices themselves from the remaining CPI group.

=== Radomes and composite structures ===
Through businesses including Radant Technologies, ESSCO, and AdamWorks, CPI supplies structures that protect antennas and RF equipment from environmental conditions while permitting the transmission of radio waves. Its products include aircraft and shipboard radomes, large ground-station radomes, and composite structures for defense and aerospace platforms.

== Ownership, management and locations ==
CPI is privately held by TJC LP. Andrew C. Ivers has served as president and chief executive officer since 2023, with former chief executive Robert Fickett serving as executive chairman.

Historically based in Palo Alto, California, CPI now lists its headquarters in Plano, Texas. As of August 2026, it reported approximately 1,200 employees, with engineering and manufacturing facilities in the United States, Canada, Estonia, Germany, and India, in addition to international sales and service operations.

== See also ==
- Varian Associates
- Satellite ground station
- Radio-frequency power amplifier
- Radome
- Klystron
