= Intevac =

American technology company

Intevac, Inc.
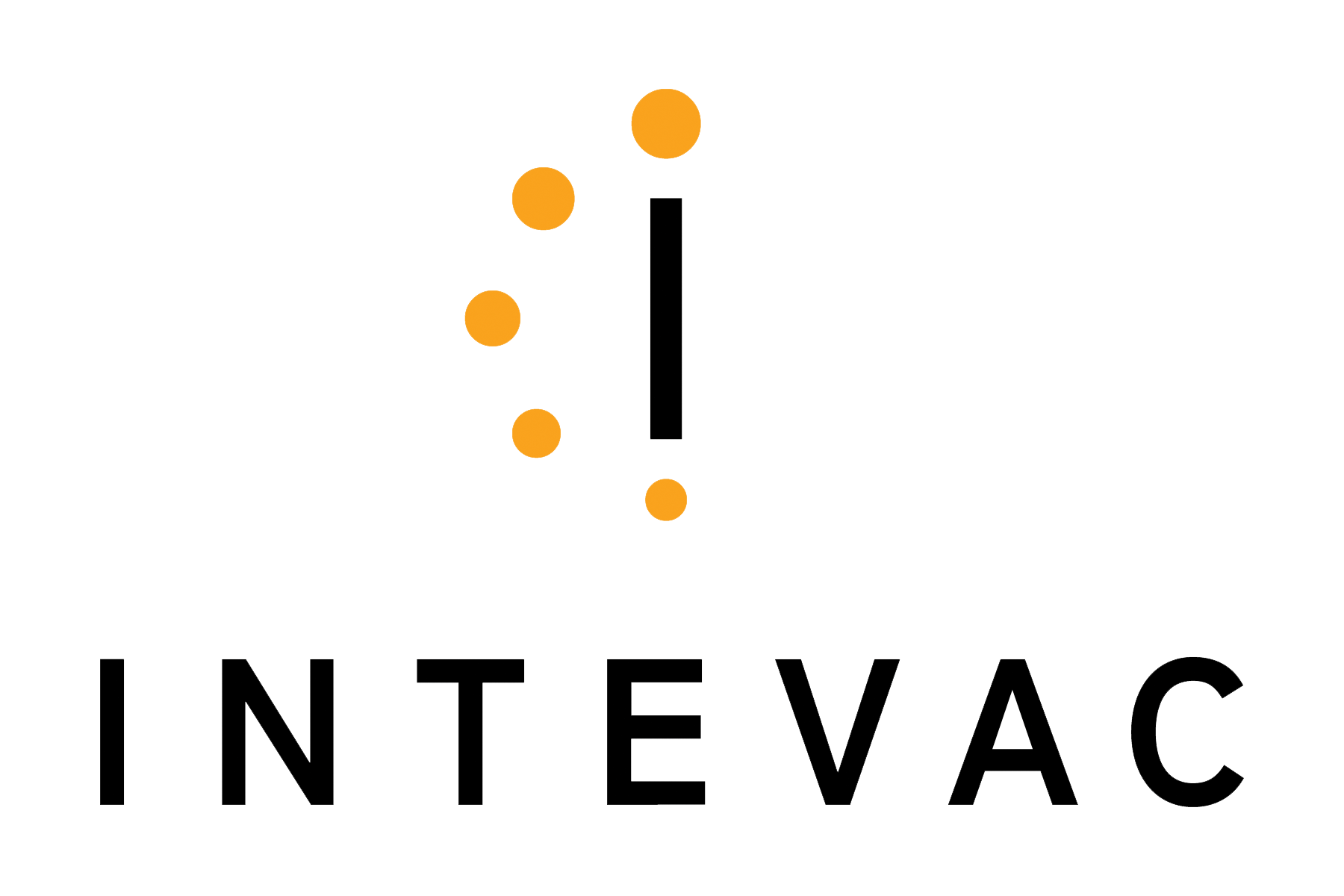
- Company type: Public
- Traded as: Nasdaq: IVAC; Russell Microcap Index component
- Industry: Capital equipment
- Founded: 1991; 35 years ago
- Headquarters: Santa Clara, California, USA
- Key people: Nigel Hunton (CEO & President)
- Revenue: US$202.5 Million (2010)
- Owner: Seagate Technology
- Website: intevac.com
- Footnotes / references Financial data is FY2010.

Intevac, Inc. was a producer of thin film deposition systems and equipment for making hard disk drives. Headquartered in Silicon Valley in Santa Clara, California, it also had offices in China, Malaysia, and Singapore.

Founded in 1991 as a spin-off of Varian Associates, the company went public four years later and reported having $13.8 million in revenue in the first half of 2022. In January 2022, the American firm divested its photonics business to Eotech for over $70 million.

In February 2025, hard disk drive maker Seagate Technology announced it would acquire Intevac for $119 million in an all-cash deal. The purchase was completed a month later.
