= Varian v. Delfino =

California Supreme Court opinion

- Supreme Court of California

Decided 5 March 2006,
- Full case name: Varian Medical Systems, Inc. v. Delfino (2005)
- Citation(s): 35 Cal.4th 180 25 Cal.Rptr.3d 298

Court membership
- Associate Justices: Janice R. Brown

Varian Medical Systems, Inc. v. Delfino, 35 Cal.4th 180 (2005) is a California Supreme Court opinion by then-Associate Justice Janice R. Brown interpreting the state's SLAPP statute. Specifically, the case holds that an appeal from a denial of an anti-SLAPP motion stays all trial court proceedings: "The perfecting of an appeal from the denial of a special motion to strike automatically stays all further trial court proceedings on the merits upon the causes of action affected by the motion...you have a right not to be dragged through the courts because you exercised your constitutional rights."

== Facts ==
In this case involving the arcana of appellate procedure, research scientists Michelangelo Delfino, Ph.D. and Mary E. Day filed an appeal from a $775,000 defamation judgment for tens of thousands of postings they made on their Website and on various Internet message boards criticizing their former employer, Varian Associates, renamed Varian Medical Systems in April 1999; two senior Varian Associates' executives, George A. Zdasiuk and Susan B. Felch; and a 1999 Varian Associates' spin off, Varian Semiconductor Equipment Associates, a high-tech corporation headquartered in Gloucester, Massachusetts. The judgment against Delfino and Day included a broad injunction ordering them not to "publish, post, or otherwise disseminate, directly or indirectly, on the Internet or elsewhere" 23 categories of statements that the trial court judge Jack Komar, and not the jury, found "untrue" and "false and defamatory."

In the fall of 2001 prior to the Santa Clara County Superior Court trial, Delfino and Day filed a special motion to strike Varian's complaint under California's Anti-SLAPP statute, Code of Civil Procedure section 425.16. The trial court denied the motion and Delfino and Day appealed from that denial, but the trial court and California Courts of Appeal refused to stay the trial under Code of Civil Procedure section 916 while the anti-SLAPP appeal was pending. At the conclusion of a seven-week jury trial the anti-SLAPP appeal was dismissed as moot.

== Ruling ==
On appeal to the California Sixth District Court of Appeal, in November 2003 a three-judge panel rejected the argument that the trial court lacked subject matter jurisdiction to conduct the trial because of Delfino and Days' pending appeal from the denial of their anti-SLAPP motion. On March 3, 2004, the California Supreme Court granted review to resolve the jurisdictional question: Does an appeal from the denial of a special motion to strike under the anti-SLAPP statute effect an automatic stay of the trial court proceedings? Three weeks after review was granted the Supreme Court stayed all of the plaintiffs' attempts to collect on the judgment and no compensation were ever collected from Delfino and Day.

On 3 March 2005, the Supreme Court held by a 7–0 vote that under Code of Civil Procedure section 916, "all of the matters on trial were embraced in and affected by defendants' appeal from the denial of that motion and the trial court lacked subject matter jurisdiction over those matters." By a 6–1 vote, Chief Justice Ronald M. George dissenting, the Supreme Court reversed the judgment, finding that the lack of subject matter jurisdiction in the trial court rendered the resulting trial completely void. The Supreme Court found that Delfino and Day's postings were simply "derogatory" and remanded the case back to the Santa Clara County Superior Court for a new trial where Komar was quickly disqualified as trial judge and replaced by the Honorable Jamie A. Jacobs-May. On the eve of a second jury trial, in March 2006 with Jacobs-May presiding and with Delfino and Day in pro per, the case settled amicably and more than seven years of remarkably acrimonious litigation ended.

Amicus curiae briefs in support of Delfino and Day were filed in the Supreme Court by the California Attorney General, the California Newspaper Publishers Association with the Los Angeles Times, Oakland Tribune and San Francisco Chronicle, and the ACLU. All four Varian plaintiffs represented by the Orrick, Herrington & Sutcliffe law firm and the Pillsbury Winthrop Shaw Pittman LLP failed to receive any amicus support.
