= Continental Electronics =

American radio equipment manufacturer

Continental Electronics Corporation
- Company type: Private
- Industry: FM Broadcast, shortwave, LF/VLF systems, and specialized Science & industrial products
- Founded: 1946; 80 years ago
- Founder: James O. Weldon
- Headquarters: Dallas, Texas, United States
- Products: High-power RF systems
- Owner: Lone Star CRA Fund
- Website: www.contelec.com

Continental Electronics is an American manufacturer of broadcast and military radio transmitters, based in Dallas, Texas. Although Continental today is best known for its FM, shortwave, and military VLF transmitters, Continental is most significant historically for its line of mediumwave (AM) transmitters, many of which are still in active service as either main transmitters or backup facilities. Among clear-channel AM stations in the U.S. and Canada, the Continental 317C was the most popular transmitter type in the 1970s and 1980s.

== History ==
Continental Electronics was founded in Dallas in 1946 by James O. Weldon, as a spin-off of the broadcast consulting business in which he was a partner, Weldon & Carr. In 1953, when Western Electric's radio equipment business was broken up by Federal antitrust regulators, Continental acquired the AM transmitter business, and with it the U.S. patent on the Doherty linear RF amplifier. Continental became part of Ling-Temco-Vought in about 1962, the first in a series of sales which would later bring it under the control of E-Systems and then Varian Associates in 1985. Tech-Sym acquired Continental from Varian in 1990, and then sold it to Integrated Defense Technologies in 2000. DRS Technologies acquired IDT in 2003, and in 2005, private-equity firm Veritas Capital (which had previously owned IDT) bought Continental back from DRS. Weldon remained with the company until his retirement in 1988.

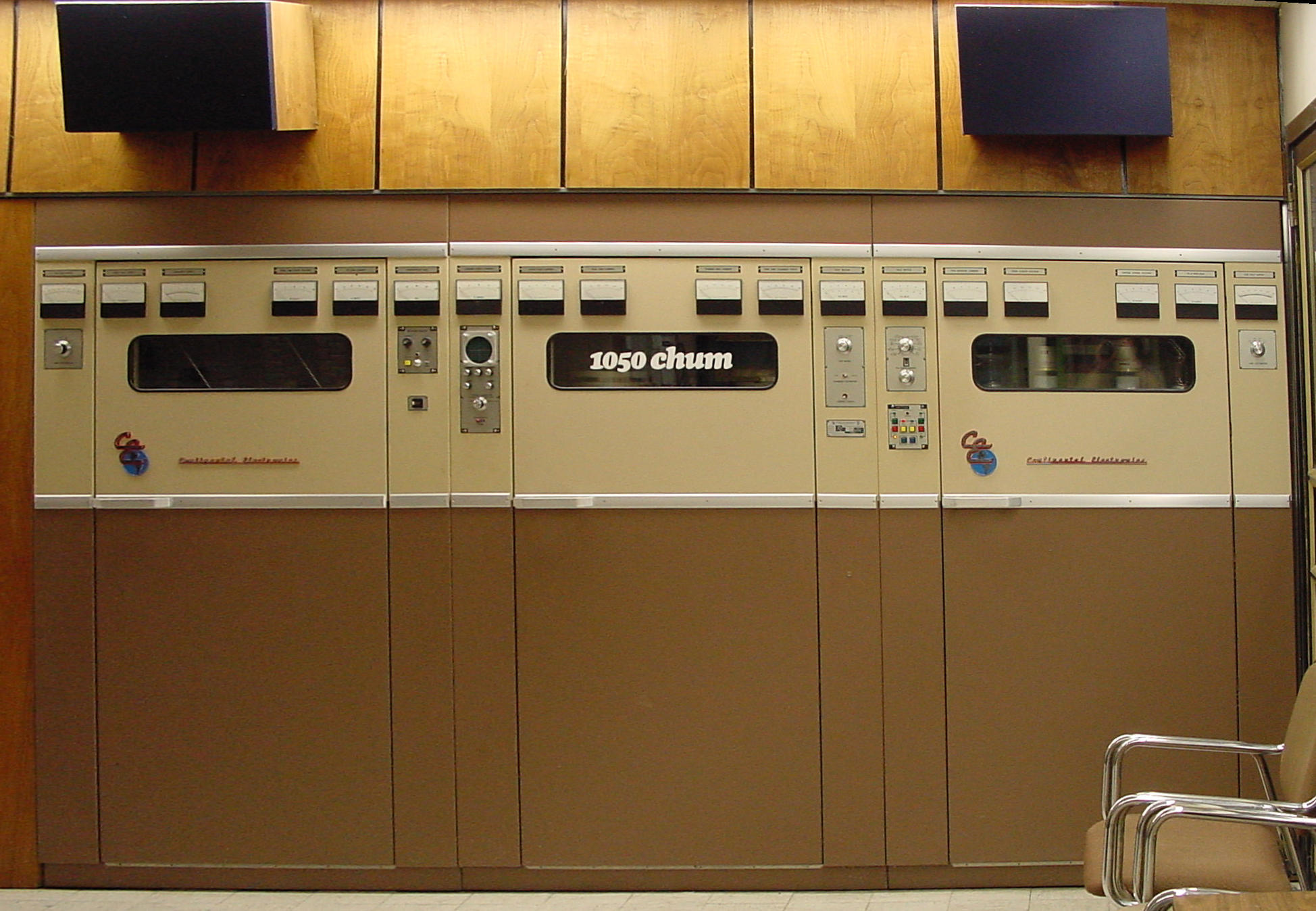
Continental 317C-2 #299, installed at CHUM (1050 Toronto)'s transmitter site in Mississauga, Ontario.

In 1958, Continental introduced a more-efficient Doherty-style amplifier based on a tetrode (previous Doherty designs made by Western Electric and Continental used triodes) with the type 317B transmitter. With four subsequent revisions, more than 200 units were sold in the 317 line (a substantial number given the limited customer base for 50-kW AM transmitters in the North American market); the final revision, the 317C-3, was introduced in 1990. By this time, competitors such as Harris had demonstrated the workability of all-solid-state 50-kW AM transmitters, which were far more energy-efficient than tube transmitters, and the North American broadcasting industry rapidly shifted away from vacuum tube-based AM transmitters. Continental eventually dropped the 317 from its product line, but still makes transmitters using similar modified-Doherty designs for high-power longwave and shortwave broadcasting and military customers.

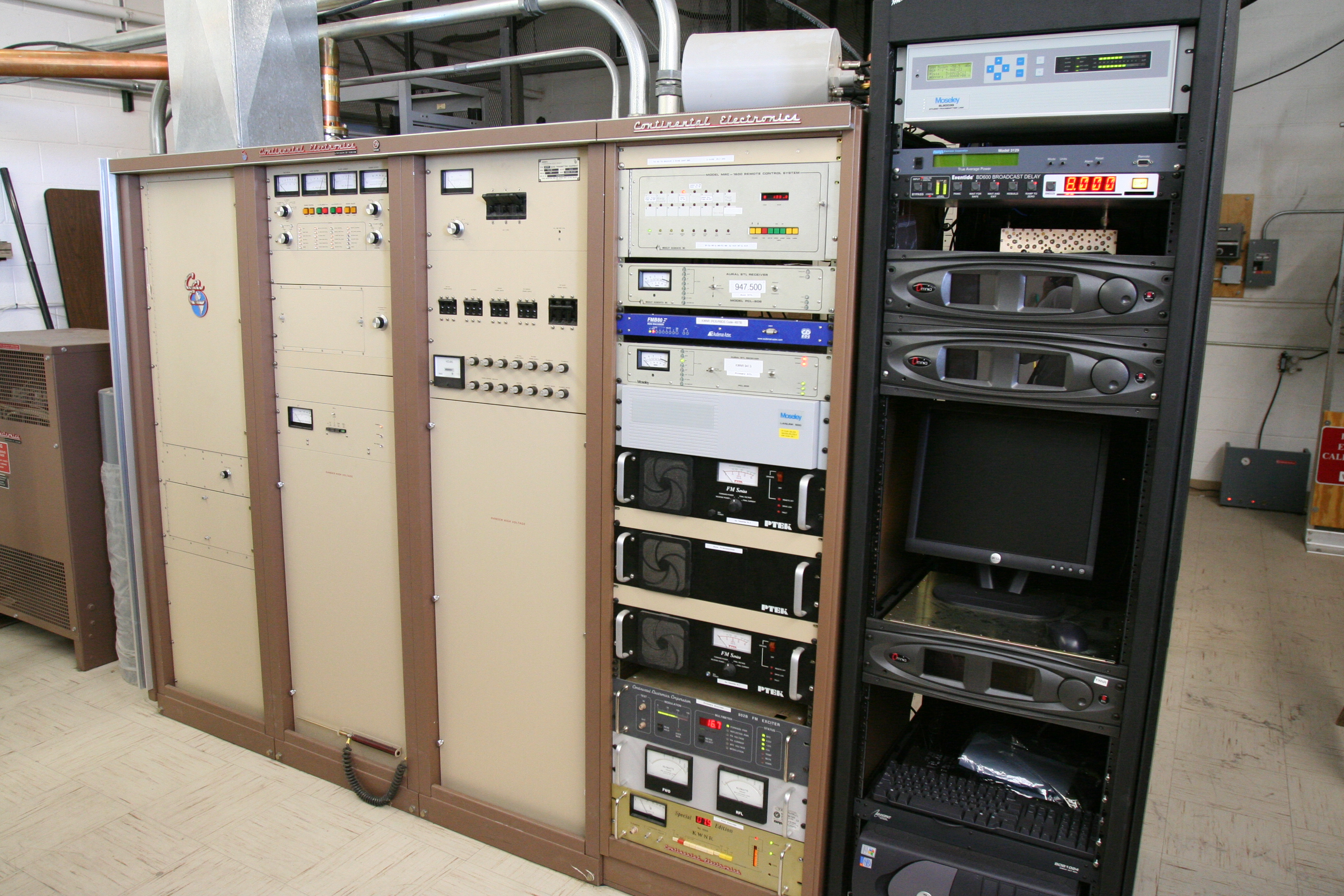
Continental 816R-5B #247, installed at KWNR (95.5 Las Vegas)'s transmitter site on Black Mountain near Henderson, Nevada

In 1980, Continental purchased the Collins Radio line of broadcast transmitters from Rockwell International. Collins's high-power FM transmitter, the type 831, replaced Continental's type 816 in production, and was renumbered the 816R. More than thirty variants of the 816R have been produced since 1980, and the line is still in production today.
