= Varian Associates =

Californian company

- Traded as: NYSE: VAR
- Founded: April 20, 1948; 78 years ago
- Fate: Split in 1999 into: Varian Medical Systems; Varian, Inc.; Varian Semiconductor
- Headquarters: Stanford Industrial Park, Palo Alto, California, United States
- Key people: Russell and Sigurd Varian
- Number of employees: 7,000 (1998)
- Subsidiaries: Varian Data Machines (1967–1977)

Varian Associates was one of the first high-tech companies in Silicon Valley. It was founded in 1948 by Russell H. and Sigurd F. Varian, William Webster Hansen, and Edward Ginzton to sell the klystron, the first vacuum tube which could amplify electromagnetic waves at microwave frequencies, and other electromagnetic equipment. Varian Associates split into three companies in 1999: Varian Medical Systems, Varian, Inc. and Varian Semiconductor.

== Incorporation and leadership ==
On April 20, 1948, the Articles of Incorporation were filed, signed by nine directors: Edward Ginzton, who had worked with the Varian brothers since his days as a doctoral student; William Webster Hansen, Richard M. Leonard, an attorney; Leonard I. Schiff, then head of the physics department at Stanford University; H. Myrl Stearns, Russell H. Varian, his wife, Dorothy Varian, Sigurd F. Varian and Paul B. Hunter. The company began with six full-time employees: the Varian brothers, Dorothy, Myrl Stearns, Fred Salisbury, and Don Snow. Technical and business assistance came from several members of the faculty at Stanford University, including Edward Ginzton, Marvin Chodorow, William Hansen, and Leonard Schiff. The company's legal counsel was Dick Leonard, a San Francisco attorney, and Paul Hunter, a patent attorney, handled matters related to patents and intellectual property rights. Francis Farquhar, an accountant and friend of Russell's from the Sierra Club, later became a director, as did Frederick Terman, dean of engineering at Stanford, and David Packard, of Hewlett-Packard. Russell served as the company Sigurd served as vice-president for engineering, and served on the board of directors until his death, sometimes serving as chairman of the board. Following the deaths of both Varian brothers, Ginzton became the CEO of the company.

Under Thomas D. Sege, the company's chief executive officer (CEO) from 1981 to 1990, sales grew to exceed $1 billion per annum. In 1990, J. Tracy O'Rourke replaced Sege as CEO and was also made chairman of the board.

== Early projects and goals ==
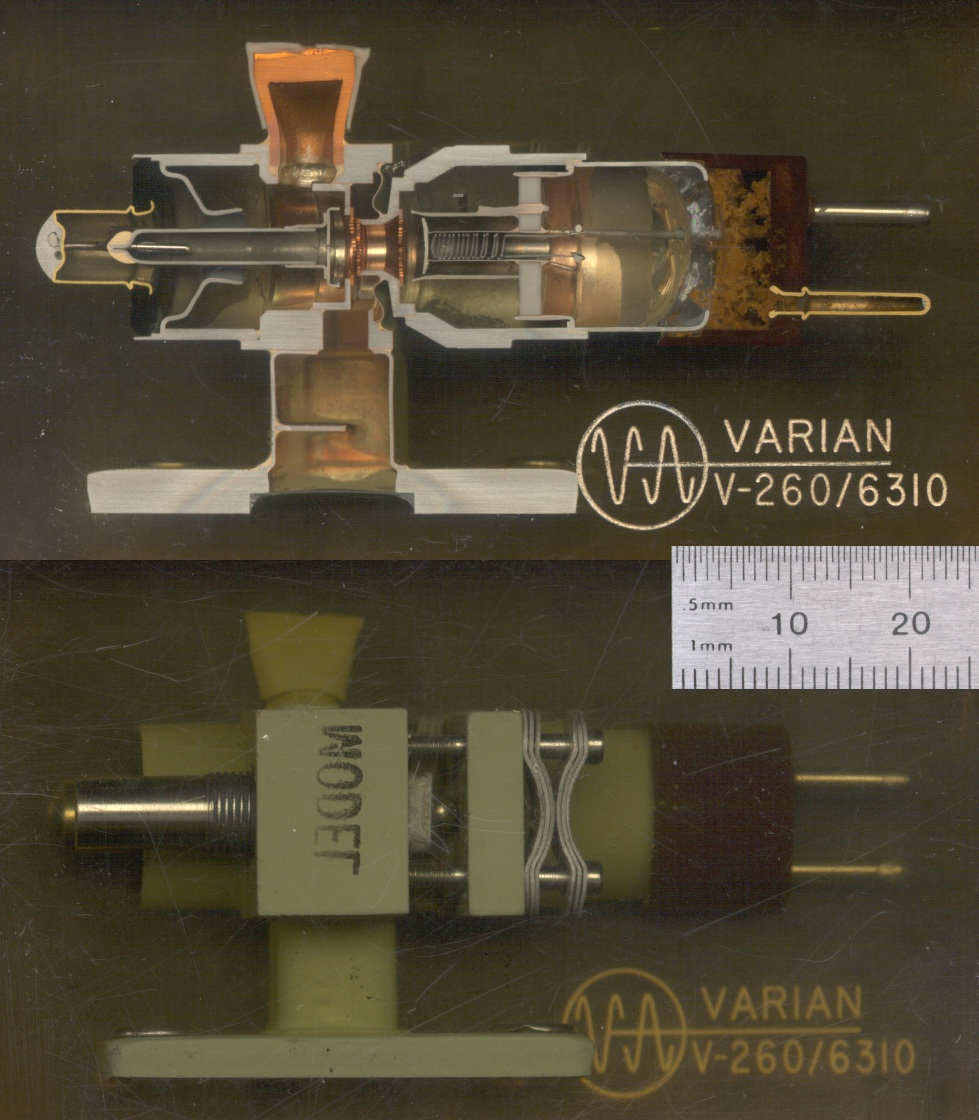
A reflex klystron (1953)

They initially created the company to commercialize the klystron and develop other technologies, such as small linear accelerators to generate photons for external beam radiation therapy. They also were interested in nuclear magnetic resonance technology.

One of Varian Associates' major contracts in the 1950s was to create a fuse for the atomic bomb. The Varian brothers had initially been supportive of military applications for the klystron and other technologies, on the grounds that they were primarily defensive weapons. This contract was different. Although politically progressive to the point of having socialist leanings, the Varians were patriotic at heart and had no sympathy for the Marxist model of socialism practiced by the Soviet Union. They also needed military contracts to survive and relished the technical challenges of this sort of work. As early as 1958 Russell and Sigurd expressed regret for their involvement in the development of weapons of mass destruction.

Most of the founders of Varian Associates, had progressive political leanings, and the company "pioneered profit-sharing, stock-ownership, insurance, and retirement plans for employees long before these benefits became mandatory". Nearly 50 years later, in 1997 the company was recognized by Industry Week as one of the best-managed companies in America. Among their early employees was bookkeeper Clara Jobs, mother of Steve Jobs.

== History ==
The company was initially headquartered in San Carlos, California, and started with only $22,000 in funding. It had problems raising additional capital, particularly due to Russell's insistence that the company be owned by its employees and his related refusal to accept outside investors. Hansen mortgaged his home for $17,000 to raise additional cash, and the group sought additional funds from friends. Ultimately the company raised $120,000 of capital via an offer of stock to all employees, directors, consultants, and a few sympathetic local investors who shared the company's goals. Military contracts for technology deemed necessary during the Cold War, including some classified projects helped the firm succeed. In 1953, Varian Associates moved its headquarters to Palo Alto, California, at Stanford Industrial Park – noted as the "spawning ground of Silicon Valley" – and was the first firm to occupy a site there.

In 1963 Varian hired Richard R. Ernst, who just graduated with a PhD in nuclear magnetic resonance spectroscopy from ETH Zurich. In the next 5 years at Varian, Ernst invented Fourier-transform NMR spectrometer and developed World's first commercial FT-NMR spectrometer, which was produced by Varian. in 1991 Ernst was awarded Nobel Prize in Chemistry for his work, that started at Varian.

In 1967, Varian entered the computer business by acquiring Decision Control Inc. (DCI) and renamed it Varian Data Machines. Their computers competed mainly with machines like those from Digital Equipment Corporation (DEC). 10 years later, Varian Data Machines was sold to Sperry Corporation.

On April 2, 1999, the company spun off its Gloucester, Massachusetts ion-implantation equipment business into Varian Semiconductor Equipment Associates and its Palo Alto-based scientific instrument business into Varian, Inc. The medical equipment business, which included manufacturing x-ray tubes in Salt Lake City, Utah, renamed itself Varian Medical Systems, Inc. and remained headquartered in Palo Alto. After the breakup, O'Rourke served as Varian Semiconductor's chairman. Varian, Inc., was later acquired by Agilent Technologies in May, 2010.

On Jan 30th 2017, Varian Medical Systems, Inc.(NYSE:VAR) spun off its X-Ray & Imaging Components business, primarily located in Salt Lake City, Utah to form VAREX Imaging Corporation (NASDAQ: VREX), a publicly listed company. The remaining part of medical equipment business, which mainly consists of oncology radiation business and proton therapy business remained with Varian Medical Systems, Inc. Headquarters remains in the Stanford Research Park, Palo Alto, California.

On August 2, 2020, Siemens Healthineers AG announced an agreement with Varian Medical Systems, Inc. to purchase the radiation oncology systems and software maker in an all-cash deal valued at $16.4 billion dollars. The deal completed on April 15, 2021, and was touted as the "biggest acquisition in healthcare" that year.

== Legacy ==
In 1998, the Congressional Record noted the 50th anniversary of the founding of Varian Associates, which then employed 7,000 people at 100 plants in nine countries. It had branched out into health care systems, analytical equipment and semiconductor manufacturing equipment. California Representative Anna Eshoo stated that the company had been awarded over 10,000 patents and was a "jewel in the crown of...Silicon Valley".

== See also ==
- Russell and Sigurd Varian
- Continental Electronics, a subsidiary from 1985 to 1990
- Communications & Power Industries, a 1995 spin-off, which includes the Varian brothers' original klystron business
- Intevac, a 1991 spin off
- Varian Data Machines, a former division of Varian Associates that sold minicomputers
- Varian v. Delfino
- Agilent Technologies, which bought Varian Inc in 2009

== Sources ==
- "America and the Utopian Dream: Utopian Communities: Halcyon". Yale University Beinecke Rare Book and Manuscript Library. Archived from the original on 2010-06-18.
- Hammond, Anne (2002). Ansel Adams: divine performance. Yale University Press. ISBN 978-0-300-09241-7.
- Hicks, Michael (2002). Henry Cowell, Bohemian. Urbana: University of Illinois Press. ISBN 0-252-02751-5
- Lécuyer, Christophe (2006). Making Silicon Valley: Innovation and the Growth of High Tech, 1930-1970. Chemical Heritage Foundation. ISBN 978-0-262-12281-8.
- Shumway, Eleanor L. (March 3, 2000). "The Temple of the People: A History". Temple of the People. Archived from the original on August 17, 2010.
- Varian, Dorothy (1983). The Inventor and the Pilot: Russell and Sigurd Varian (First ed.). Pacific Book Pub. ISBN 978-0-87015-237-5.
