= Stanford Research Park =

Technology park in Palo Alto

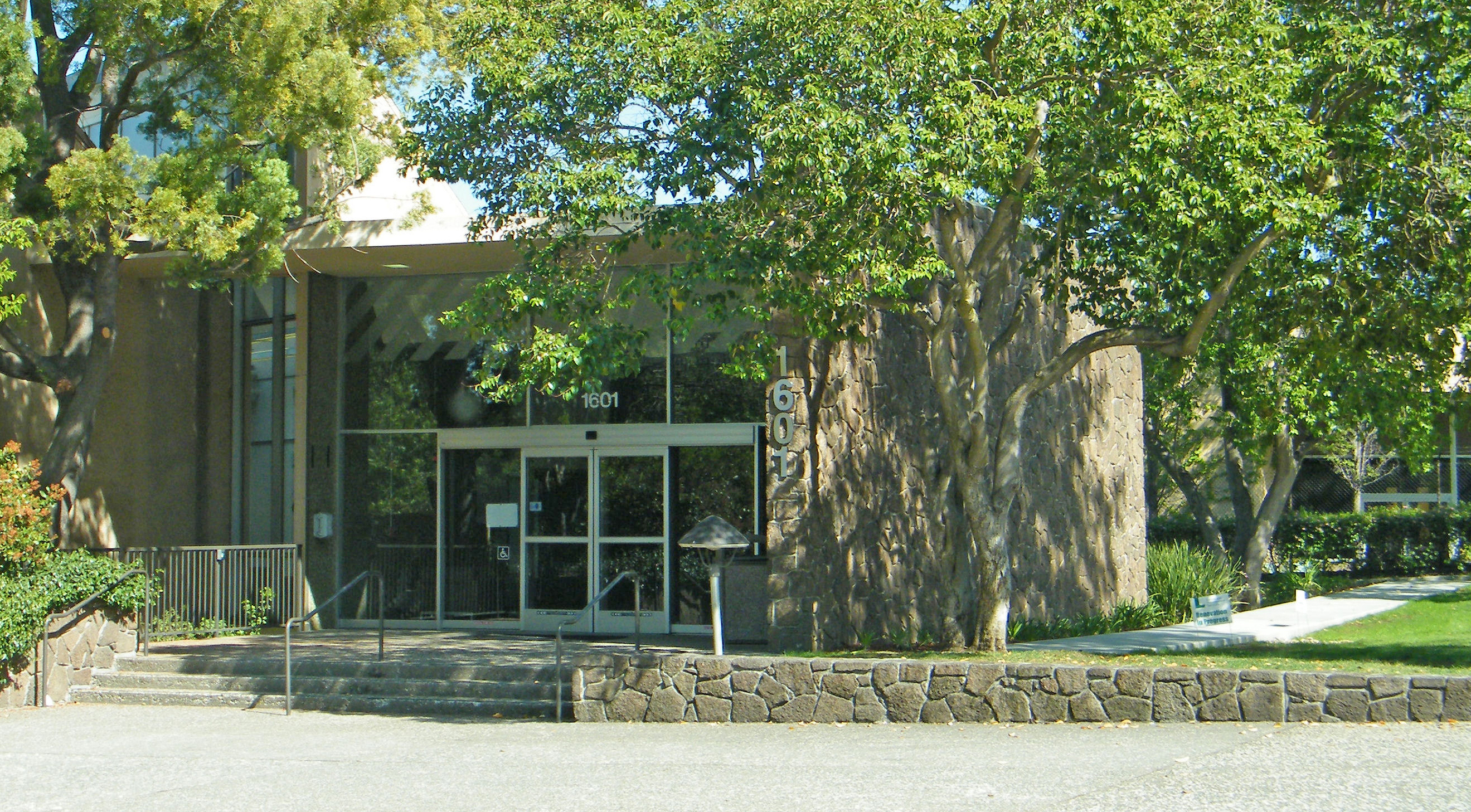
- Facebook's former headquarters in Stanford Research Park
- Former names: Stanford Industrial Park

General information
- Location: Palo Alto, California, United States
- Coordinates: 37.4069°N 122.1518°W
- Current tenants: Tesla, xAI, HP, Broadcom, SAP, Rivian, Guardant Health, StartX, Arc Institute
- Construction started: 1951
- Opened: 1953
- Owner: Stanford University
- Landlord: Stanford University

Technical details
- Grounds: 700-acre (280-hectare)

Website
- stanfordresearchpark.com

Stanford Research Park (SRP) is a technology park established in 1951 as a joint initiative between Stanford University and the City of Palo Alto. It was the world's first university research park. It has more than 150 companies, including Rivian, HP, Tesla, xAI, SAP and Broadcom; previous high-profile tenants include NeXT Computer, Xerox PARC, and Facebook. It has been called "an engine for Silicon Valley" and "the epicenter of Silicon Valley".

== Facilities ==
The park covers a 700-acre (280-hectare) area and has 10 million square feet of commercial real estate in an area surrounding Page Mill Road, south west of El Camino Real and extending beyond Foothill Expressway to Arastradero Road. By January 2018, the park's 140 buildings house over 150 different companies and their 23,000 employees. It is currently home to companies like HP, Lockheed Martin, Rivian, Martin Collier Phillips, Broadcom, and SAP. Tesla is the park's largest tenant as of December, 2025. In 2016, SRP contributed an estimated $775 million in terms of economic activity to Palo Alto and approximately $2.4 billion to Santa Clara County. In 2016, SRP contributed more than $45 million in taxes (across local, state, and federal).

== History ==
After World War II, Stanford University found itself in difficult financial circumstances. But given that it was rich in land, Stanford University Provost and Dean of Engineering Frederick Terman proposed a Stanford-affiliated and R&D-focused business park that would generate income for Stanford as well as tax revenue for the Palo Alto community. Stanford University and the City of Palo Alto partnered to found the park, which was initially named Stanford Industrial Park. In 1951, the initiative was authorized and 209 acres were allocated. In 1953, Varian Associates moved in as the park's first tenant.

In the early days, Stanford tightly controlled development, without the help of an outside developer. It also rigorously screened potential tenants to ensure they were in line with university objectives. By 1956, Hewlett-Packard established its world headquarters in SRP. The park acquired more land as it grew from 40 tenants in 1960 to 100 tenants in 1985 to over 150 by January 2018. The name was changed in the 1970s to Stanford Research Park to highlight "the focus of cooperation between the university and the tech companies". In 1991, the Stanford Management Company was established to manage the university's financial and real estate assets, including SRP.

=== Controversies ===
In 2014, the Palo Alto City Council allowed a proposed 17-acre (6.9-hectare) affordable housing community with 180 units in the Stanford Research Park to proceed, despite protests by neighborhood residents. The community opened in June 2017. In 2016, Stanford University and twelve of the park's largest companies formed the Transportation Management Association in order to mitigate traffic congestion from employee commutes, noting that it was making companies within the park less attractive to current and prospective employees. SRP lacks a nearby Caltrain station. The group is exploring several options, including "new shuttles, carpool routes and a trip-planning app".

== See also ==
- Business cluster
- Mega-Site
