= Varian Data Machines =

- Formerly: Decision Control Inc.
- Founded: 1967
- Headquarters: Newport Beach, California, United States
- Products: Minicomputers
- Parent: Varian Associates (1967–1977); Sperry Corporation (1977–?)

Varian Data Machines was a division of Varian Associates which sold minicomputers. It entered the market in 1967 through acquisition of Decision Control Inc. (DCI) in Newport Beach, California. It met stiff competition and was bought by Sperry Corporation in June 1977 who merged it into their Sperry UNIVAC division as the Sperry UNIVAC Minicomputer Operation.

== Computers ==
DATA / Varian 620 registers
^{1}_{5}	^{1}_{4}	^{1}_{3}	^{1}_{2}	^{1}_{1}	^{1}_{0}	^{0}_{9}	^{0}_{8}	^{0}_{7}	^{0}_{6}	^{0}_{5}	^{0}_{4}	^{0}_{3}	^{0}_{2}	^{0}_{1}	^{0}_{0}	(bit position)
Accumulator registers
A																Register A
B																Register B
Index register
X																Index Register X
Program counter
	P															Program counter
Status register
															O	Overflow flag

=== DATA/620 ===
The first DCI DATA/620 was installed in 1965 and could be rented for $900 per month, a lower cost than most other computers then available. The DATA/620 was a parallel, binary 16-bit general-purpose digital computer with magnetic-core memory expandable to 32,768 words. An 18-bit word length (for data, not addresses or instructions) was optionally available. A basic machine cycle took 1.8 microseconds, and the core memory read time was 700 nanoseconds. The computers use two's complement arithmetic and had four main registers - accumulator A, accumulator extension B, an index register X and a program counter register. Some variants supported microprogramming. The DATA/620 used a hardware front panel console that allowed starting and stopping the machine, examining memory and registers and changing memory or registers with front-panel switches. The company proudly proclaimed that most debugging was now possible "without even having to use an oscilloscope". The DATA/620 was built with discrete transistors in a bit-sliced architecture (that is, the arithmetic unit and all registers for one bit are contained in two circuit boards). The system of circuit boards was called "VersaLOGIC", with logic levels of 0 V and -12 V. Architecture and instruction set of the DATA/620 were similar to other minicomputers of the era, such as the Honeywell 316 or the PDP-8. Features typical of early minicomputers (and not found in later microprocessor architectures) include:

- The absence of a stack pointer. Instead, the return address of a subroutine call is stored in the first word of the subroutine (see PDP-8 § Subroutines for a more detailed discussion).
- The possibility to "micro-code" several operations in one instruction word (e.g. set A, B, and X to zero in one operation; see PDP-8 § OPR (OPeRate) for comparison). Likewise, a single jump instruction can test several condition at once, i.e. the jump is performed if all the tested conditions are true (e.g. A, B, and X are all zero).
- Multi-level indirect addressing. Instead of the address of an operand, an instruction contains the address of the address of the operand.
- An execute instruction that allows a single, one-word instruction to be executed from an arbitrary address (since the execute instruction itself is a two-word instruction, nested execute instructions are not possible). There are unconditional and conditional forms of this instruction.

Register A serves as the primary accumulator, that is, it supplies one operand for arithmetic and logic operations and receives the result of the operation. The second operand for these operations is read from memory. The first 2048 words of memory can be addressed directly by arithmetic and logic operations. Addressing the full memory range requires the use of registers B or X as an index register or the use of an indirect address in the first 512 words of memory. The second operand could also be addressed relative to the program counter P (up to 512 words) or be an immediate, 16-bit value. A hardware option could be purchased that added multiplication and division instructions (which combined A and B as a 32-bit register).

A DATA/620 with up to 8192 Words of memory weighed 400 lb (180 kg) and consumed 500 W.

By November 1967, 75 DATA/620 computers had been installed.

=== DATA 620/i ===
The 620/i shipped in June 1967. The use of DTL and TTL integrated circuits allowed the weight to be reduced to 90 lb (41 kg) and the power consumption to 340 W. The rental rate was reduced to $500 per month. The system used 5 V logic levels (like all subsequent computers in the series) and was packaged in a 19-inch rack. The bit-slice architecture of the 620/i could fit 6 bit for all registers on one circuits board (in the 16-bit version, 2 bit on one card were not used). The instruction set was backwards compatible to the DATA/620. Beside the optional multiplication and division instructions another hardware option could be purchased that allowed the entire address range to be addressed directly through two-word arithmetic/logic and load/store operations. Varian called this extended addressing.

The R-620/i, a ruggedized version of the DATA 620/i, was announced in April 1969.

By November 1970, 1300 DATA 620/i had been installed, making this machine far more popular than the original DATA/620.

=== Varian 620/f ===
The 620/f shipped in November 1970. By using 7400 Series integrated circuits, including the 74181 arithmetic-logic unit, the 620/f achieved a faster machine cycle time of 750 nanoseconds.

A lower cost 520/i shipped in October 1968.

=== Varian 620/L ===
The 620/L-100 was released in 1973. It had a cycle time of 950 nanoseconds and a more compact system chassis than the 620/F. The Sperry V70 series had semiconductor memory, but could also support magnetic core. Various models were released between 1972 and 1977.

== Applications ==
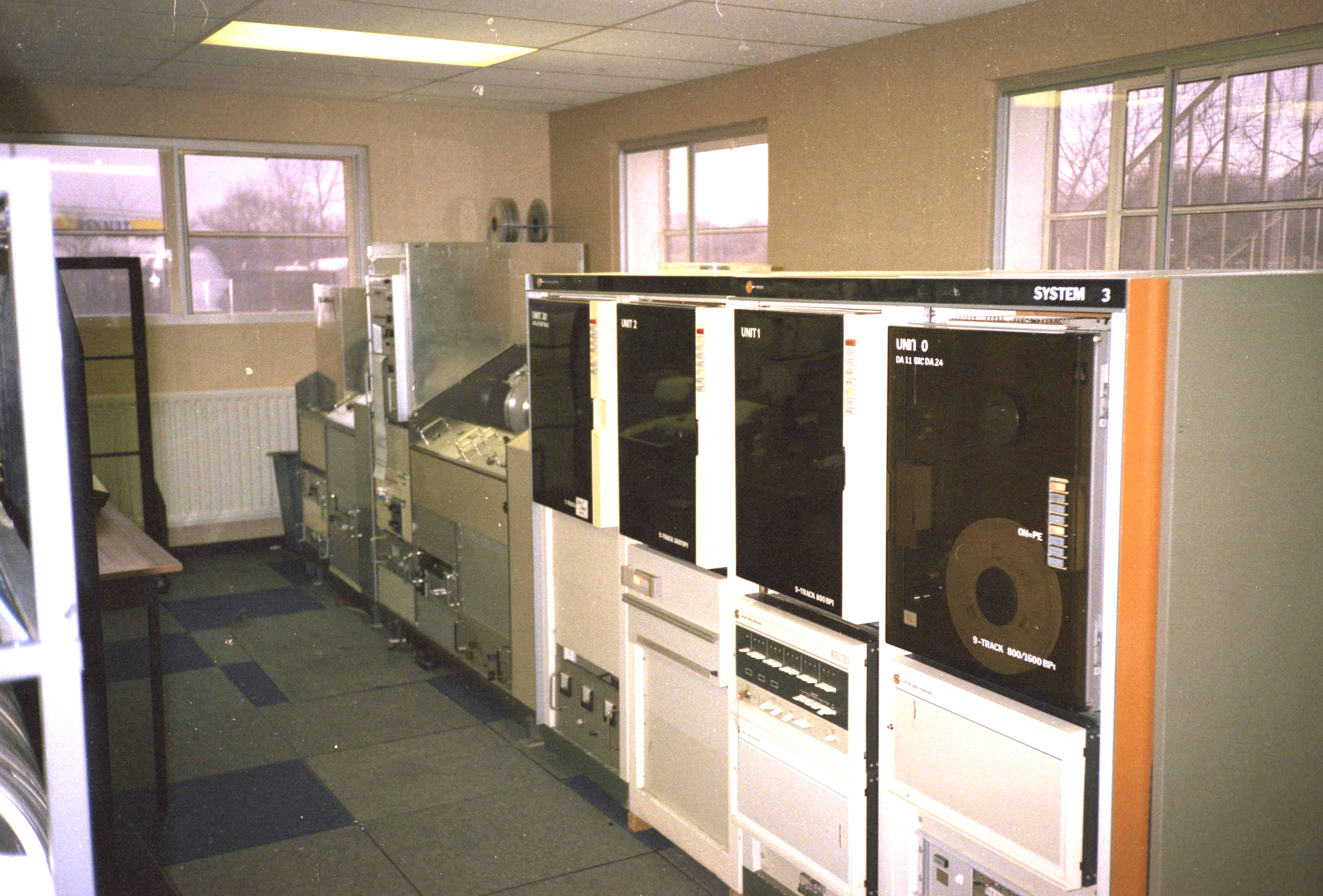
Varian Data Machines system connected to an analogue tape playback system in 1984

The Tymnet network, a communication network predating the Internet that gave terminals access to remote mainframe computers, used Varian 620/i computers as its end points. A number of terminals were connected to the 620/i through asynchronous serial links with baud rates between 110 and 300 baud. A synchronous leased line with a baud rate of 1200 or 2400 baud then connected the 620/i to the network. Interestingly, the 620/i computers did not have serial interface hardware but performed the serialization/deserialization and baud rate detection in software ("bit banging").

Varian V72 computer systems were installed at Bruce Nuclear Generating Station on the eastern shore of Lake Huron in Ontario, Canada, as the digital control computer system that monitors and controls the major reactor and power plant functions. As of February 2017 these were still in operation and scheduled to be replaced by more modern systems in 2018 and 2019.

== Varian computers in museums ==
The MIT Museum has a Varian 620/i in its collection.
