= Varian, Inc. =

U.S. technology company

Varian Inc.
- Type: Public (NASDAQ: VARI)
- Industry: Scientific instruments
- Founded: 1999
- Fate: Acquired by Agilent Technologies
- Headquarters: Palo Alto, California
- Key people: Allen J. Lauer, Chairman; Garry Rogerson, President & CEO
- Products: Scientific instruments
- Number of employees: 3,700
- Website: www.varianinc.com

Varian, Inc. was one of the largest manufacturers of scientific instruments for the scientific industry. They had offerings over a broad range of chemical analysis equipment, with a particular focus on Information Rich Detection and Vacuum technology. Varian was spun off from Varian Associates in 1999 and was purchased by Agilent Technologies in May 2010 for $1.5 billion, or $52 per share.

Varian Inc. had its corporate headquarters in Palo Alto, California, and offices in Australia, the Benelux countries, Brazil, Canada, China, Germany, France, Italy, Japan, Korea, Russia, Sweden, Taiwan, the United Kingdom, and the United States.

== Manufacturing plants ==
Varian Inc. contained the following manufacturing plants:

- Lake Forest, California USA
- Palo Alto, California USA
- Walnut Creek, California USA
- Lexington, Massachusetts, USA
- Cary, North Carolina, USA
- Mulgrave, Victoria Australia (the largest Varian Inc manufacturing and R&D plant)
- Middelburg, The Netherlands
- Grenoble, France
- Yarnton, United Kingdom
- Church Stretton, Shropshire, United Kingdom (polymer laboratories)
- Turin, Italy

== Products and services ==
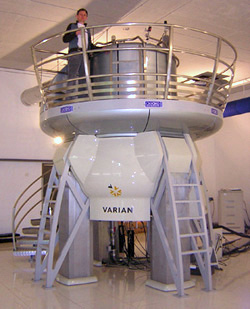
A 900MHz NMR instrument

- Chromatography, including gas chromatography, GC/MS, high performance liquid chromatography, and LC/MS.
- Spectroscopy, including UV-Vis, CD, near infrared, and FT-IR
- Inductively coupled plasma, including mass spectroscopic and atomic emission spectroscopic detection.
- mass spectrometry, including FTMS
- Nuclear magnetic resonance
- Linear accelerator
- Magnetic resonance imaging
- X-ray Crystallography
- Information rich detection
- Drugs of Abuse Testing
- Dissolution Testing
- Vacuum Pumps
- Leak Detection
- Turbo Pumping Systems
- Vacuum Measurement
- Valves and components

== History ==
In October 1967, Techtron Pty Ltd merged with Varian Associates. Techtron is a manufacturer of Atomic Absorption Spectrometers and Spectral lamps.

In 1982, Varian transferred the Cary UV-Visible product line to Australia.

In 1997, Varian bought Chemagnetics, a Colorado-based manufacturer of solid-state NMR spectrometers.

In 2002, Varian bought Ansys Technologies, Inc., a California-based manufacturer of In-Vitro Medical Devices.

In 2004, Varian Inc bought Magnex Scientific, an Oxford-based manufacturer of high-field magnets.

In 2005, Varian bought Polymer Laboratories, a speciality polymer analysis and manufacturing company.

In 2006, Varian bought Ion Spec, an FTMS (Fourier Transform Mass Spectrometry) manufacturing company.

In 2007, Varian, Inc. bought Analogix, Inc., a company specializing in flash chromatography.

In 2008, Varian bought Oxford Diffraction, a British company specializing in X-ray diffraction equipment.

On 27 July 2009, Agilent Technologies announced it would buy Varian Inc, for $1.5 Billion.

On 14 October 2014, Agilent made the strategic decision to close its NMR business. Agilent entered the NMR business in 2010, with the acquisition of Varian.

Several former Varian engineers have continued the business through private ventures, including the probe department spawning the company PhoenixNMR and the software being made open source. Many of the former Varian employees now honor Russell Varian's legacy of innovation by funding the Varian Young Investigator Award that recognizes early career investigators in NMR that make significant advancements in instrument development.

== See also ==
- Laboratory equipment
