= W. W. Hansen =

William Webster Hansen
- Born: May 27, 1909; Fresno, California
- Died: May 23, 1949 (aged 39); Palo Alto, California
- Education: Stanford University
- Known for: microwave electronics
- Scientific career
- Fields: accelerator physics
- Workplaces: Hansen Laboratories

William Webster Hansen (May 27, 1909 – May 23, 1949) was an American physicist and professor. He was one of the founders of the technology of microwave electronics.

== Biography ==
Hansen's father William G Hansen, who was a son of immigrants from Denmark, was a hardware store owner in Fresno, California. He encouraged his son's early talent in mathematics and enthusiasm for electronics. He entered Stanford University at the age of 16, earning his B.A. in 1929 and his Ph.D. in 1933.

Hansen went on to become interested in the problem of accelerating electrons for X-ray experiments, using oscillating fields, rather than large static voltages. At the University of California, Berkeley, Ernest Lawrence and his assistant David H. Sloan, had worked on an accelerator driven by a resonant coil. Hansen proposed replacing the coil with a cavity resonator. In 1937, brothers Russel H. Varian and Sigurd F. Varian came to Stanford to work on the foundations of what was to become radar. Hansen exploited some of the Varian's work to develop the klystron and during the years 1937 to 1940, along with collaborators such as John R. Woodyard, founded the field of microwave electronics. In 1941, he moved his team to the Sperry Gyroscope Company where they spent the war years employing their expertise in radar applications and in other problems.

Returning to Stanford in 1945 as a full professor, he embarked on the construction of a series of linear accelerators based on klystron technology and of GeV performance. Along with the Varian brothers and Edward Ginzton, he co-founded Varian Associates in 1948. Sadly, he was never to see the completion of the klystron project. He died at age 39 in Palo Alto, California of berylliosis and fibrosis of the lungs, caused by inhaling the beryllium used in his research. In 1947, the Hansen Experimental Physics Laboratory (HEPL) was founded as a facility at Stanford University. The facility is designed to promote interdisciplinary enterprises across different branches of science and was named in his honor.

== Personal life ==
In October 1938, William Webster Hansen married Betsy Ross, who was the younger daughter of Perley Ason Ross, professor of physics at Stanford. Shortly after his death Betsy committed suicide. Their only child had died six months after his birth during the fall of 1947.

== Honors ==
- IEEE Morris N. Liebmann Memorial Award of the Institute of Radio Engineers (1944)
- President's Certificate of Merit (1948)
- Member of the National Academy of Sciences (1949)

== Sources ==
- Obituaries:
  - New York Times, 24 May 1949
  - Proceedings of the Institute of Radio Engineers, 37 (1949), 910
- Bloch, Felix (1952). "William Webster Hansen, 1909-1949". Biographical Memoirs of the National Academy of Sciences. 27: 121–137.
- Süsskind, C. (1981). "Hansen, William Webster". In Gillespie, C.C. (ed.). Dictionary of Scientific Biography. New York: Charles Screibner's Sons. pp. 495–496. ISBN 0-684-16970-3.
- Varian, Dorothy (1983). The Inventor and the Pilot: Russell and Sigurd Varian. Palo Alto: Pacific Books. ISBN 978-0870152375.

== Related Reading ==
- Wilson, R. R.; Littauer, R. (1960). Accelerators: Machines of Nuclear Physics. New York City: Doubleday & Company.
- Ginzton, Edward L. (1975). "The $100 idea". IEEE Spectrum: Feb. 30–39. doi:10.1109/MSPEC.1975.6368703. S2CID 19467137.
- Bloch, F.; Hansen, W. W.; Packard, Martin (1 February 1946). "Nuclear Induction". Physical Review. 69 (3–4): 127. Bibcode:1946PhRv...69..127B. doi:10.1103/PhysRev.69.127.
- Ginzton, Edward L. (April 1983). "Early Accelerator Work at Stanford" (PDF). SLAC Beam Line: 2–16. Archived from the original (PDF) on 2022-11-18.
