= List of compositions by Henry Cowell =

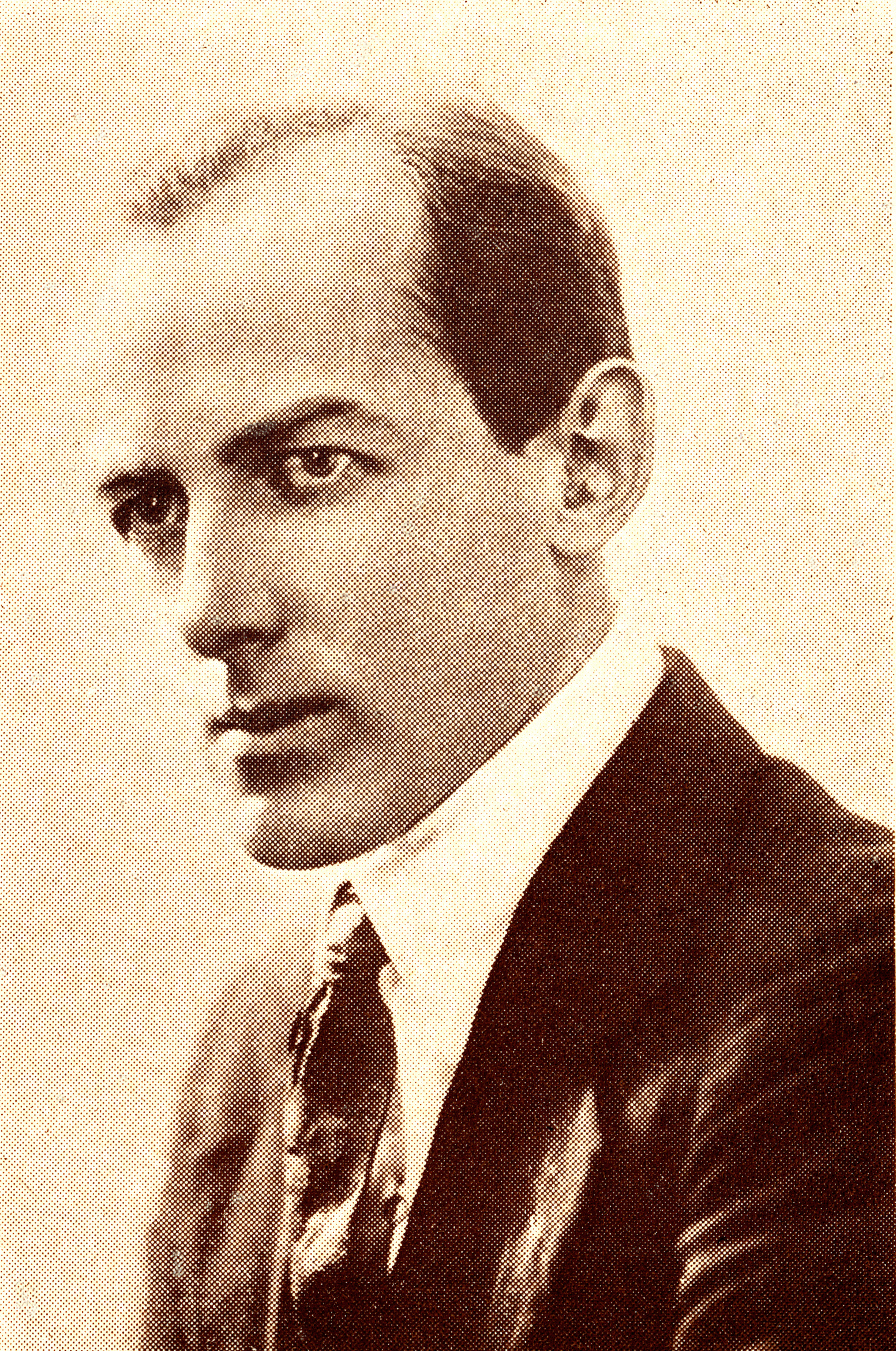
Photo of Henry Cowell from promotional flier for his 1924 Carnegie Hall debut

This is a list of compositions by Henry Cowell.

== Pieces by date of composition ==
- Anger Dance (1914; orig. Mad Dance)
- Sonate for cello and piano (1915)
- Dynamic Motion (1916; frequently misdated 1914)
- For Unaccompanied Cello (1919)
- Three Irish Legends (1922)
1. The Tides of Manaunaun (1917; frequently misdated 1911 or 1912)
2. The Hero Sun (1922)
3. The Voice of Lir (1920)
- Five Encores to Dynamic Motion (1917)
1. What's This?
2. Amiable Conversation
3. Advertisement
4. Antinomy (rev. 1959)
5. Time Table
- The Trumpet of Angus Og (1918–24)
- Fabric (1920)
- Vestiges (1920)
- The Sword of Oblivion for string piano (ca. 1920–22)
- Exultation (1921)
- Six Ings (1922)
1. Floating
2. Frisking
3. Fleeting
4. Scooting
5. Wafting
6. Seething
- Piece for Piano with Strings (1923; for solo string piano, despite possibly confusing title)
- Aeolian Harp for string piano (ca. 1923)
- Ensemble for String Quintet and Thunder Sticks (1924)
- A Rudhyar (1924)
- The Harp of Life (1924)
- The Snows of Fuji-Yama (1924)
- The Banshee for string piano (1925)
- Slow Jig (1925)
- The Leprechaun (1928)
- Two Woofs (1928)
- Euphoria (1929)
- Fairy Answer (1929)
- Two Pieces (1930)
1. Lilt of the Reel
2. Tiger
- Sinister Resonance for string piano (ca. 1930)
- Ostinato Pianissimo (1934) for xylophone soloist and percussion ensemble
- Deep Color (1938)
- Rhythmicana (1938)
- High Color (ca. late 1930s–early 1940s)
- Elegie (for Hanya Holm) (1941)
- Saturday Night at the Firehouse for orchestra (1948)
- Persian Set (1957)
- Homage to Iran (1957)
