= Frog Peak Music =

Frog Peak Music is a composer's collective that produces and distributes experimental works, and functions as a home for its artists. It was co-founded in 1984 by Jody Diamond and Larry Polansky.

"Frog Peak Music is dedicated to exploring innovative technologies and aesthetics of publication and distribution, and committed to the idea of availability over promotion. Member artists determine which of their own works are included in Frog Peak, and how they are included."

"Frog Peak Music perpetuates and evolves the historical role of experimental independent publishing in the United States. In so doing, the collective engenders a hospitable publication environment for its members, and provides an example of some of the ways that artists might control their own work in a non-commercial, non-hierarchical fashion, erasing distinctions between artist and publisher."

"FP carries scores, recordings, writings and other works by hundreds of artists internationally. Frog Peak Music also has a CD label and several publications, including James Tenney's Meta + Hodos, John Chalmers' Divisions of the Tetrachord, and several others."

Frog Peak has published editions of the works of Johanna Magdalena Beyer, Ruth Crawford Seeger, and an on-line web-book, Janet and Her Dear Pheobe, written by Henry Cowell's mother (Clarissa Dixon).

== Members ==
- Anthony Braxton
- Philip Corner
- Barbara Benary
- Warren Burt
- Jody Diamond
- Rodney Dirk
- Alvin Curran
- Kenneth Gaburo (and Lingua Press)
- Kyle Gann
- Peter Garland
- Daniel Goode
- Lou Harrison
- Paul Paccione
- Larry Polansky
- David Rosenboom
- Frederic Rzewski
- Ezra Sims
- James Tenney
- Lois V Vierk
- Soundings Press
