= The Snows of Fuji-Yama =

Henry Cowell wrote the piano piece The Snows of Fuji-Yama (Note: Often is misspelled as "The Snows of Fujiyama".), HC 395, in 1924.

The piece was from Cowell's tone cluster phase and was his first expedition into the foray of Asian-inspired music, using black-key clusters to emphasize a pentatonic scale in F♯ major. He first performed the piece at a concert in the Los Angeles Millennium Biltmore Hotel on November 20, 1926.

== See also ==
- List of solo piano compositions by Henry Cowell
