= Piano Concerto (Cowell) =

- by Henry Cowell
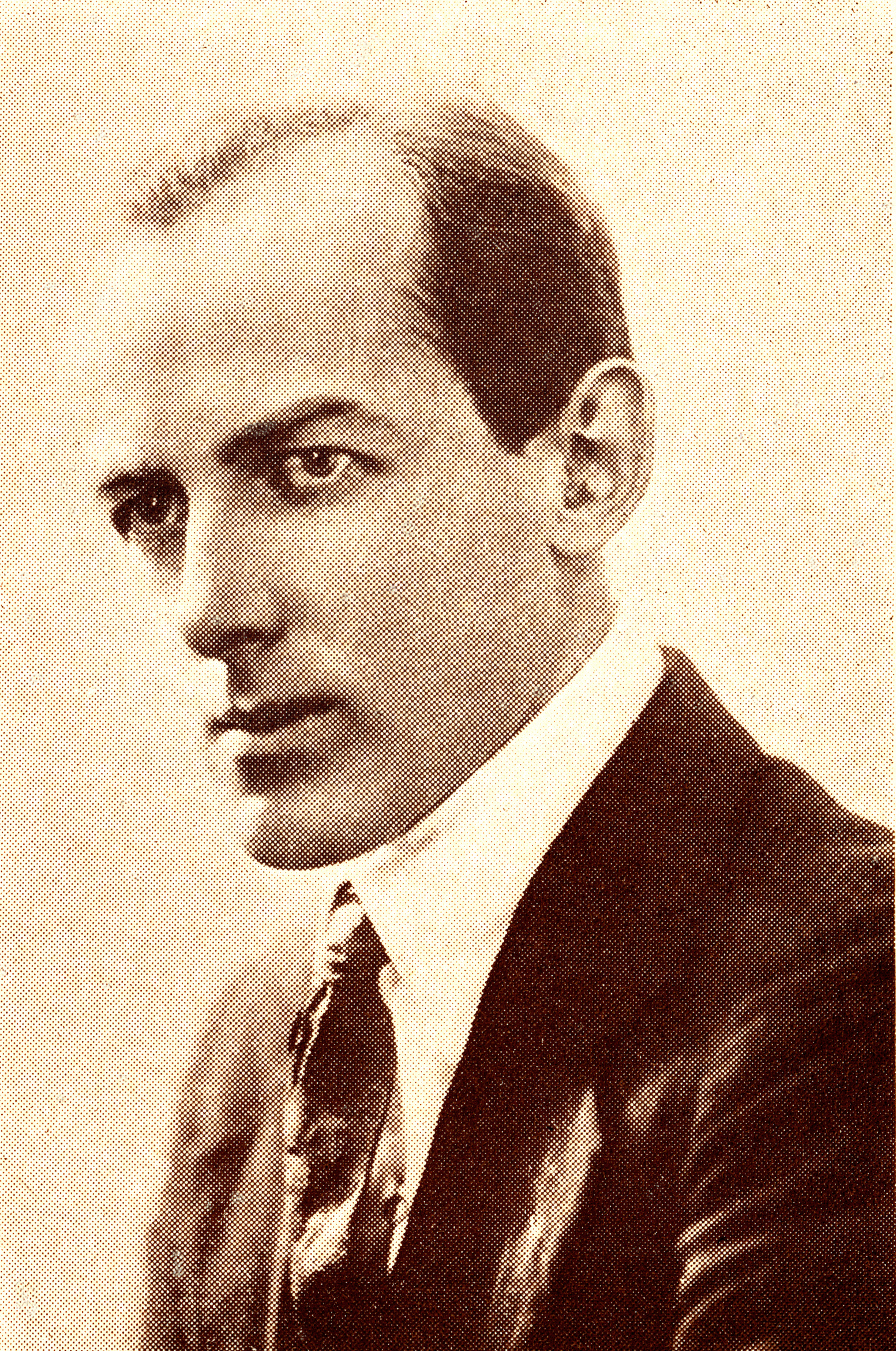
- Photo of Henry Cowell c. 1924
- Catalogue: HC 440
- Composed: 1928
- Performed: December 28, 1930
- Movements: 3
- Scoring: Piano concerto

Henry Cowell wrote his Piano Concerto (formally Concerto for Piano and Orchestra) in 1928. The piano concerto contains many innovative uses of dissonance, cluster chords and extended uses of form.

== History ==
Cowell completed his Piano Concerto in 1928, and premiered the first movement as soloist with the Conductorless Orchestra of New York City in April 1930; he was also the soloist in the first complete performance on December 28, 1930, with the Havana Philharmonic conducted by Pedro Sanjuan. It was only until 1978, long after the composer's death, that its first full performance was done in the United States.

== Movements ==
The concerto is in three movements:

1. Polyharmony
2. Tone Cluster
3. Counter Rhythm

The first movement, Polyharmony, begins with an orchestral tutti.

== Instrumentation ==
The concerto is scored for an orchestra with the following instruments:

Woodwinds

2 flutes
2 oboes
2 clarinets
2 bassoons

Brass

2 horns
2 trumpets
3 trombones (3rd doubling bass trombone)
tuba

Percussion

timpani

snare drum
tam-tam
cymbal

Keyboards

piano

Strings

16 violins
8 violas
8 cellos
4 basses

== See also ==
- List of solo piano compositions by Henry Cowell
