= Sidney Robertson Cowell =

American ethnomusicologist

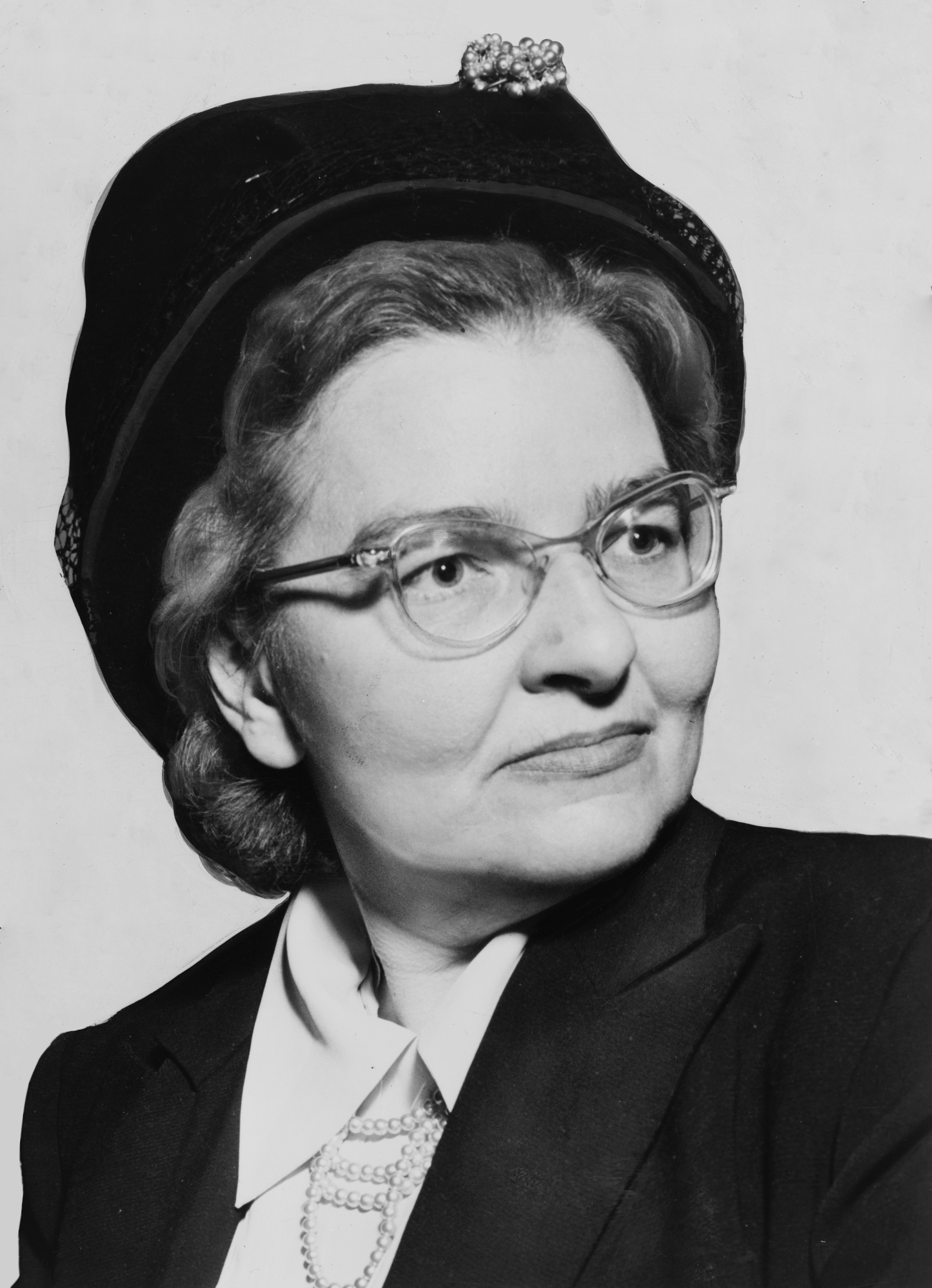
- Portrait of Cowell c. 1948
- Born: Sidney William Hawkins; June 2, 1903; San Francisco, California, U.S.
- Died: February 23, 1995 (aged 91); Woodstock, New York, U.S.
- Occupations: Ethnomusicologist; writer; pianist
- Spouses: Kenneth Robertson (m. 1924; div. 1934) Henry Cowell (m. 1941)

Sidney Robertson Cowell (born Sidney William Hawkins; June 2, 1903 – February 23, 1995) was an American ethnomusicologist, collector of folk songs, and the wife of the composer Henry Cowell.

== Life and career ==
She was born on June 2, 1903, in San Francisco, California, the daughter of Mabel (née Morrison) and Charles Albert Hawkins. She received a BA in Romance languages and philology from Stanford University in 1924. Later that year she married Kenneth Robertson, a medical student, and they went to Europe. She enrolled in 1925 in the École Normale de Musique in Paris, where she studied piano with Alfred Cortot. Upon returning to California, she taught at the Peninsula School for Creative Education in Menlo Park, California from 1926 to 1932. During that period, she studied counterpoint and analysis with Ernest Bloch and the music of non-European cultures with Henry Cowell at the San Francisco Conservatory of Music.

After divorcing in 1934 she moved to New York City, where she directed the Social Music Program at the Henry Street Settlement on the Lower East Side, working with elderly Jewish immigrants. In 1936 she became an assistant to Charles Seeger, technical advisor of the Music Unit of the Special Skills Division of the Resettlement Administration in Washington, D.C. (later the Farm Security Administration). In this capacity she began collecting recordings of folk music in Appalachia, the Ozarks and the Upper Midwest.

She returned to California, where she initiated and arranged for sponsorship by the Library of Congress, the University of California, Berkeley, and the Works Progress Administration of the Northern California Folk Music Project, which she directed from 1938 to 1940 with a staff of twenty. The project was one of the earliest attempts at conducting a large-scale ethnographic survey of American folk music in a defined region. In addition to 35 hours of sound recordings, the team complied 168 photographs of the musicians and their instruments and copious documentation.

In 1941 she married Henry Cowell, whom she had known since her teen years in California. The following year they moved to Shady, New York, a hamlet in the town of Woodstock. During World War II the two traveled as cultural ambassadors for the State Department, collecting music from around the world. They collaborated on numerous publishing projects. After his death in 1965 she continued to actively promote his musical legacy. She died at her home in Shady in 1995.

== Bibliography ==
- (1942) The Recording of Folk Music in California (Berkeley, Calif. : University of California Press).
- (with Alan Lomax, 1942). American Folk Song and Folk Lore, a Regional Bibliography (Washington, D.C.: Progressive Education Center).
- (with Henry Cowell, 1955). Charles Ives and His Music (New York : Oxford University Press).

== See also ==
- Folk Music of Wisconsin, 1937
