= The Tides of Manaunaun =

1917 composition by Henry Cowell

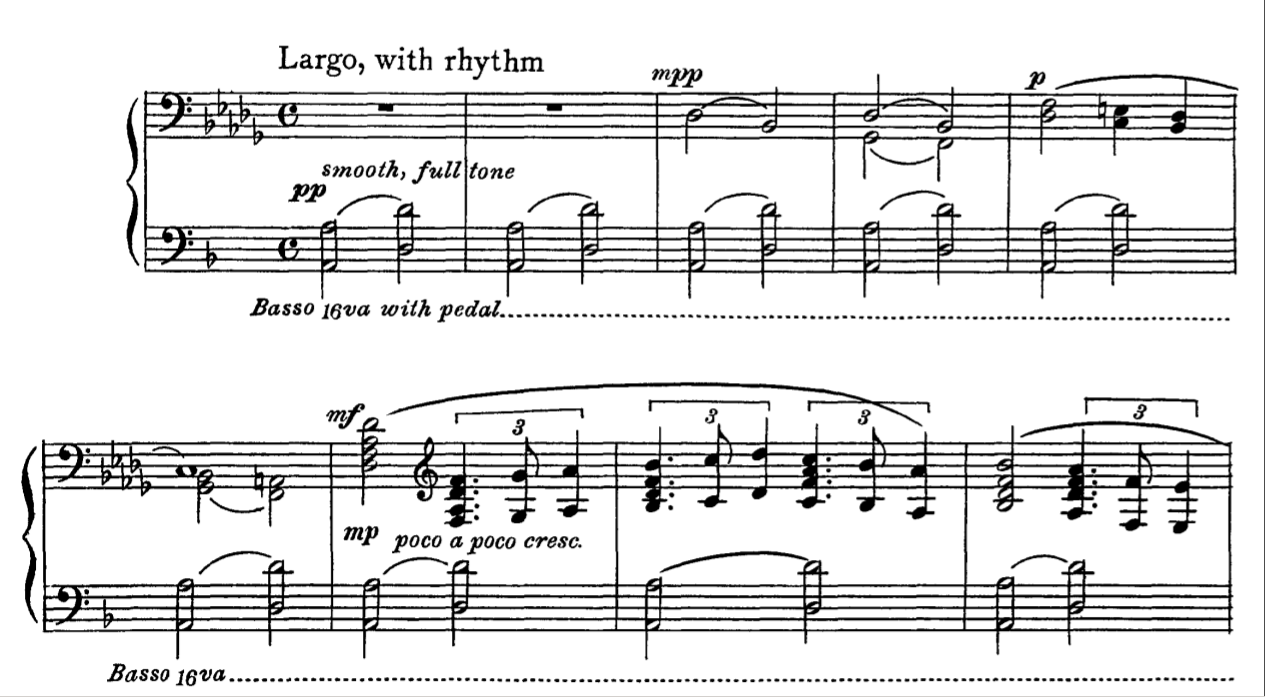
Opening bars of The Tides of Manaunaun, showing thirteen-note tone clusters. Massive clusters of 25 notes or more, to be played with the left forearm, occur later.

The Tides of Manaunaun is a short piano piece in D♭ Major by American composer Henry Cowell (1897–1965). It premiered publicly in 1917, serving as a prelude to a theatrical production, The Building of Banba. The Tides of Manaunaun is the best known of Cowell's many tone cluster pieces.

== Background ==
The Building of Banba, for which The Tides of Manaunaun was composed, was based on Irish mythological poems by the theosophist John Osborne Varian. The Building of Banba has been described by some scholars as a "pageant" or "play", and by Cowell himself (more than fifty years later) as an "opera". The production was staged in the summer of 1917 at a convention of the theosophical community of Halcyon in coastal San Luis Obispo County, California; Varian was a leader of the group, to which he had introduced the 20-year-old Cowell. Cowell would later claim that The Tides of Manaunaun had been composed in 1912, or even earlier. In 1944, Cowell arranged this song for orchestra and band – presumably to be played on radio – but the score was lost and no records have been found to confirm the radio broadcast. This song is dedicated to "B.W.W.", Blanche Wetherill Walton (1871–1963), Cowell's foremost patron and adherent over the years as well as a patron to Charles Seeger and Ruth Crawford Seeger. Cowell dedicated five other works to her between 1924 and 1961: "Ensemble, How Come?", "Euphoria", "Merry Christmas for Blanche", and "Birthday Melody for Blanche".

The work is the most famous and widely played of Cowell's tone cluster pieces, which he performed during tours of North America and Europe from the early 1920s through the mid-1930s. A performance of Cowell's so inspired Béla Bartók that the great Hungarian composer sought Cowell's permission to use tone clusters in his own work. Bartók would feature them in his Piano Sonata (1926) and suite Out of Doors (1926), his first significant works after three years of little composition.

Other early pieces of Cowell's featuring tone clusters include the atonal, dissonant Dynamic Motion (1916) and its five "encores"—What's This? (1917), Amiable Conversation (1917), Advertisement (1917), Antinomy (1917, rev. 1959; frequently misspelled "Antimony"), and Time Table (1917). In The Tides of Manaunaun the clusters resound majestically and then slowly subside, conveying not dissonance but transcendent mystery. As Cowell describes on the final, narrative track of the Folkways album on which his last piano recordings appear,

In Irish mythology, Manaunaun was the god of motion and of the waves of the sea. And according to the mythology, at the time when the universe was being built, Manaunaun swayed all of the materials out of which the universe was being built with fine particles which were distributed everywhere through cosmos. And he kept these moving in rhythmical tides so that they should remain fresh when the time came for their use in the building of the universe.

During the first two decades of his compositional career, Cowell continued often to reference Irish mythology in the titles of his piano pieces. The Harp of Life (1924), Cowell said, "is another in the suite based on the early Irish mythological opera," as, he explained, were The Voice of Lir (1920) and The Trumpet of Angus Óg (1918–24). Additional mythic traditions are referenced by The Hero Sun (1922), The Banshee (1925), and The Leprechaun (1928). Cowell also wrote songs of a similarly mythological character, including Angus Óg (The Spirit of Youth) (1917) and Manaunaun's Birthday (1924).

== Recordings ==
The Tides of Manaunaun
The first thirty seconds of the piece, as performed by Henry Cowell in 1963

The Tides of Manaunaun was first recorded around 1925 by Margaret Nikoloric for piano roll. Edwin Hughes played it for President Franklin D. Roosevelt at the White House, and Percy Grainger performed it frequently. (In 1940, Grainger would come to Cowell's aid by hiring him as an assistant when Cowell was paroled after serving four years in prison on a "morals" charge.) Under the name Deep Tides, Leopold Stokowski orchestrated The Tides of Manaunaun as the first of four Tales of Our Countryside (also known as Four Irish Tales), which he recorded in 1941. Cowell himself would record the original version at least twice—for Pleyel piano roll in the 1920s and for Folkways in the 1960s. It has been most recently recorded by Steffen Schleiermacher (1993, rel. 1994), Sorrel Hays (1997, rel. 1999), and Stefan Litwin (1999).

=== Albums including The Tides of Manaunaun ===
- American Piano Concertos: Henry Cowell (col legno 20064)—performed by Stefan Litwin (also includes orchestrated version performed by Radio Symphony Orchestra Saarbrücken, Michael Stern–director, Stefan Litwin–piano)
- The Bad Boys!: George Antheil, Henry Cowell, Leo Ornstein (hatHUT 6144)—performed by Steffen Schleiermacher
- Henry Cowell: Piano Music (Smithsonian Folkways 40801)—performed by Henry Cowell
- New Music: Piano Compositions by Henry Cowell (New Albion 103)—performed by Sorrel Hays

=== Listening ===
- Art of the States: Henry Cowell performances of six works by the composer, including The Tides of Manaunaun

== Sources ==
- Bartok, Peter, Moses Asch, Marian Distler, and Sidney Cowell; revised by Sorrel Hays (1993 [1963]). Liner notes to Henry Cowell: Piano Music (Smithsonian Folkways 40801).
- Cowell, Henry (1993 [1963]). "Henry Cowell's Comments: The composer describes each of the selections in the order in which they appear." Track 20 of Henry Cowell: Piano Music (Smithsonian Folkways 40801).
- Hicks, Michael (2002). Henry Cowell, Bohemian. Urbana: University of Illinois Press. ISBN 0-252-02751-5
