= John Osborne Varian =

Irish-American poet (1863–1931)

- John Varian photographed by Ansel Adams
- Born: 1863; Ireland
- Died: January 9, 1931 (aged 67–68)
- Occupations: Poet and amateur musician
- Spouse: Agnes Varian
- Children: Russell and Sigurd Varian; Eric Varian
- Relatives: Sheila Varian (granddaughter)
- Writing career
- Language: English

John Osborne Varian (1863 – January 9, 1931) was an American poet and amateur musician who was one of the early members of the Temple of the People and a leader within the theosophist utopian community of Halcyon, California. Two of his sons, Russell and Sigurd Varian, became notable inventors and went on to found Varian Associates, one of the first companies in Silicon Valley. Varian died on January 9, 1931, following pneumonia.

== Career ==
Born in Ireland, John Varian and his wife, Agnes became members of the Theosophical Society in Dublin where the movement attracted literary figures such as W. B. Yeats, James Cousins, and others. The Varians emigrated from Ireland to the United States in 1894, first settling in Syracuse, New York. There, the Varians became involved with a theosophical group headed by William Dower. When Dower moved to Halcyon, California, they joined him in 1914, shortly after its founding. Halcyon was a utopian community that included a sanatorium for the treatment of liquor, morphine, and opium addiction. The community had elements of socialism and some communal property. There, John Varian became a leader of the Temple of the People, simultaneously working with Dower as a chiropractor and masseur, while Agnes was the first Halcyon storekeeper and postmistress.

== Family ==
John and Agnes had three sons, Russell, Sigurd and Eric, all of whom had a keen interest in electricity. Russell was named in honor of the poet "Æ", George Russell, whom John had befriended in Ireland. The family was noted for affection, laughter and a spirit of adventure. All three boys exhibited an early fascination with electricity, which included pranks such as attaching electrical current to bed springs and door knobs in order to give visitors minor electric shocks. Russell and Sigurd became the co-founders of Varian Associates, an early Silicon Valley firm noted for production of the klystron tube, while Eric remained in the Halcyon area and had a career in the central California coast as an electrical contractor, and assisted the work of his daughter, Sheila Varian, who became a noted horse breeder.

== Artistic pursuits and affiliations ==
Varian's strong interest in Irish mythology helped fuel the interest of the young composer Henry Cowell in Irish folk culture and mythology. Cowell had previously befriended Varian's son Russell in 1911, when both boys were in their teens, and a piano sonata that Cowell composed for Russell brought Cowell to the attention of the elder Varian. In 1917, Cowell wrote the music for Varian's stage production of his Irish mythical poetry cycle, The Building of Banba. The prelude Cowell composed, The Tides of Manaunaun, would become one of Cowell's most famous and widely performed work. The Building of Banba has been described by some scholars as a "pageant" or "play," and by Cowell himself (more than fifty years later) as an "opera." The production was staged in the summer of 1917 at a convention of the theosophical community at Halcyon.

What majestic word are you speaking now, out of your ages and ages of growth...talking to the light and reaching for the sky?

— John Varian, "Sand Dunes" (publ. 1934)

Cowell in turn was a childhood music tutor of Ansel Adams, and the Varian family also became friends with Adams, who became particularly close to Russell and Sigurd through their mutual activity in the Sierra Club. Adams knew the family for over 30 years, and upon John Varian's death wrote a poem, To John Varian, which was published in 1931. While that work was one of only a few poems published by Adams, he later used a line from one of Varian's poems, "...What Majestic Word," as the title of his 1963 Portfolio Four, which was dedicated to the memory of Russell Varian, who had died in 1959.

Another close associate of Varian and his family was fellow Irish immigrant and theosophist Ella Young, who lived in Halcyon in a cabin behind the Varian's home in 1928 while she was finishing her book, The Tangle-Coated Horse and Other Tales, and working on her poetry. Varian himself published poetry, including works in the poetry journal Troubador' and a posthumous collection, Doorways Inward, published in 1934.

== Selected works ==
- "Black Mountain" (1906)
- "The Temple Convention" (1907)
- "The Living Symbol" (1907)
- "Body of God" (1929)
- Tirawa (1930)
- "The Wave" (1934)
- Doorways inward and other poems (1934)

== See also ==
- Celtic Revival

== Sources ==
- "America and the Utopian Dream: Utopian Communities: Halcyon". Yale University Beinecke Rare Book and Manuscript Library. Archived from the original on 2010-06-18.
- Hammond, Anne (2002). Ansel Adams: divine performance. Yale University Press. ISBN 978-0-300-09241-7.
- Hicks, Michael (2002). Henry Cowell, Bohemian. Urbana: University of Illinois Press. ISBN 0-252-02751-5
- Shumway, Eleanor L. (March 3, 2000). "The Temple of the People: A History". Temple of the People. Archived from the original on March 8, 2001.
- Varian, Dorothy (1983). The Inventor and the Pilot: Russell and Sigurd Varian (First ed.). Pacific Book Pub. ISBN 978-0-87015-237-5.
