= Madras Symphony =

The Madras Symphony is a symphony by American composer Henry Cowell, the 13th of the 20 he finished. It was composed in 1958. It was composed after Cowell's return from Madras, where he had studied Indian classical music.

The five movements of the symphony are

1. Alapna: Andante rubato
2. Tala Adi: Allegretto
3. Allegro
4. Andante
5. Allegro

The instrumentation includes parts for tablas and jalatarang, which are solistic and virtuosic in nature.

The American West Coast premiere of the symphony was given by San Francisco Composers Chamber Orchestra, conducted by Mark Alburger, at Old First Church in San Francisco on June 10, 2005. The work was also performed in 2010 at the Juilliard School in New York City.
