= List of classical music concerts with an unruly audience response =

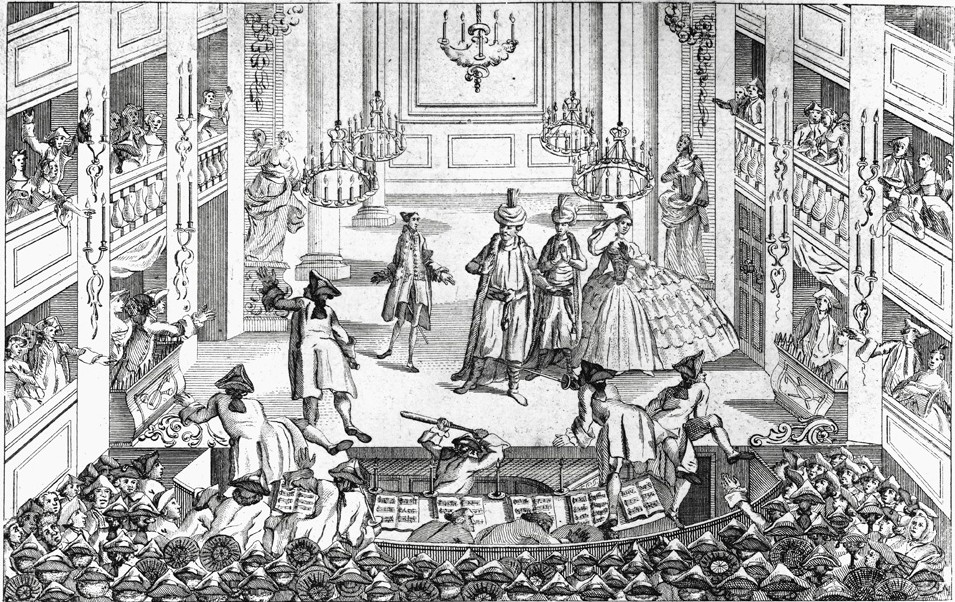
Riots at the Royal Opera House, 1763

There have been many notable instances of unruly behaviour at classical music concerts, often at the premiere of a new work or production. Audience members displayed unruly behavior for a variety of reasons.

== 18th century ==
Composer	Title	Date	Location	Details
Thomas Arne	Artaxerxes	February 24, 1763	London	At the revival of Thomas Arne's opera Artaxerxes, a mob protesting the abolition of half-price admissions stormed the theatre in the middle of the performance.

== 19th century ==
Composer	Title	Date	Location	Details
William Reeve	Family Quarrels	December 18, 1802	London	Part of the Jewish audience catcalled because of perceived anti-Jewish slights. The melody of one of the songs in this opera greatly resembled the sacred Jewish Kaddish prayer.
Gioachino Rossini	The Barber of Seville	February 20, 1816	Milan	Many audience members were supporters of the elder composer Giovanni Paisiello who had written a Barber of Seville of his own. They shouted, heckled, hissed, and jeered at Rossini's new version of the piece.
Daniel Auber	La muette de Portici	August 25, 1830	Brussels	Audience members at a performance in Brussels left before the end of the opera to join planned riots that were already taking place across the city, marking the beginning of the Belgian Revolution.
Hector Berlioz	Benvenuto Cellini	September 10, 1838	Paris	The audience hissed at most of the music after the first few numbers.
Richard Wagner	Tannhäuser	March 14, 1861	Paris	The audience was unruly for several reasons. Whistling and cat-calls occurred the night before, during the premiere of the "Paris version", in response to the music, like the shepherd's piping in Act I. Wagner also did not pay the claque's fee in order to prevent disruptions. The interruptions increased during the second performance, when the Jockey-Club de Paris organized a disruption in response to the opera's ballet being placed in the first act instead of the second, which was customary. The jockey members usually arrived in time for the second act in order to see the ballet, and did not take kindly to Wagner's dissent.
Arrigo Boito	Mefistofele	March 5, 1868	Milan	The audience came predisposed to drown out Boito's claqueurs and succeeded in making the music inaudible with their hisses and boos.

== 20th century ==
Composer	Title	Date	Location	Details
Giacomo Puccini	Madama Butterfly	February 17, 1904	Milan	One of the biggest flops in Italian opera history, the performance was met with jeers and boos throughout. Originally, the opera was split into only two acts, with no intermission during the overlong second act. Puccini, aiming for verismo, planted people with bird-whistles throughout the audience to accompany the Act 2 intermezzo. The already restless audience responded by making loud animal noises of their own. Puccini withdrew the opera the very next day and made several changes before re-debuting the opera three months later in Brescia to a much more favorable response.
Richard Strauss	Elektra	March 12, 1910	London	Due to Strauss's already poor reputation, when he was brought on stage, he was met with screaming and fits of discontent.
Francesco Balilla Pratella	Musica Futurista	March 9, 1913	Rome	At the second performance of the work, the audience booed and threw refuse at the orchestra, and some fighting occurred.
Alban Berg	Altenberg Lieder	March 31, 1913	Vienna	As part of a front in Vienna's ongoing style wars, the audience booed and catcalled, and some punches were thrown. Berg's piece was highly expressionistic, which prompted the uproar after growing tension in the crowd. The event came to be known as the Skandalkonzert and also as the Watschenkonzert due to the concert organizer allegedly slapping an audience member, which was described by Oscar Straus as "the most harmonious sound of the evening."
Igor Stravinsky	The Rite of Spring	May 29, 1913	Paris	Audience members were shocked by the avant garde music, choreography, and production design. The audience's exclamations and jeering grew to a deafening uproar.
Sergei Prokofiev	Piano Concerto No. 2	September 5, 1913	St. Petersburg	The work was met with hisses and catcalls.
Luigi Russolo	The Awakening of a City, The Meeting of Automobiles and Aeroplanes	April 21, 1914	Milan	A concert organized by the Futurists to provide the first public demonstration of their experimental "noise-making" instruments called intonarumori resulted in an expected fracas, with Futurists led by Filippo Tommaso Marinetti fighting members of the audience in the stalls.
Erik Satie	Parade	May 18, 1917	Paris	One faction of the audience booed, hissed, and was generally unruly, but they were eventually silenced by an enthusiastic ovation.
Anton Webern	Five Movements for String Quartet, Op. 5	August 8, 1922	Salzburg	Rosaleen and Hans Moldenhauer called Webern's "Salzburg affair" a "riot [...] subdued only by police". Webern interrupted his summer with Schoenberg in Traunkirchen to attend the Amar Quartet's performance, praising them to Berg but leaving briefly shaken and deterred from composing. Wilhelm Grosz cried "terrible!" and laughed during the fourth movement, while Adolf Loos and Rudolf Ganz defended Webern. A London Daily Telegraph reporter wrote, "I never saw an angrier man" of Webern's taking the stage amid the fray, "as if he were going to kill". The Quartet played the work in full for an invitation-only audience the next day, and Arthur Bliss, Arthur Honegger, Francis Poulenc, and Jean Wiéner reassured Webern.
Edgard Varèse	Hyperprism	March 4, 1923	New York	The audience laughed throughout and hissed at the conclusion, which prompted Varèse to repeat the work in hopes of a more serious response.
Rued Langgaard	Symphony No. 6	September 26, 1923	Copenhagen	Frejlif Olsen, editor of the Ekstra Bladet, reported what happened the day after: "The audience abandoned themselves to one surprise after the other; along the rows of seats tittering, hissing, the gnashing of teeth and suppressed 'goodgriefs' could be heard [...] some groaned, others spat, an elderly lady collapsed and had to be carried out, and when the piece had finally come to an end, a violent booing and hissing could be heard throughout the concert hall, offended shrieks and outbursts of laughter drowned out a half-hearted applause. Rud Langgaard failed to understand what was going on - he thought he was being called forward, he stood up there on stage and waved and bowed with a bouquet of flowers in one hand."
George Antheil	Sonata Sauvage	October 4, 1923	Paris	Very raucous physical altercations and verbal fights broke out within three minutes of Antheil playing, with many distinguished guests in attendance. Artist Man Ray reportedly punched a man in the nose, Marcel Duchamp began hurling obscenities at a fellow audience member, and Erik Satie was heard shouting, "What precision! What precision!"
Henry Cowell	Antinomy	October 15, 1923	Leipzig	The audience threw program notes at Cowell and clambered onto the stage, leading to a large physical altercation and the arrest of over 20 audience members.
Henry Cowell	Five Encores to Dynamic Motion	October 31, 1923	Vienna	An audience member began screaming at Cowell, "Stop! Stop!" and would not be quiet when shushed by audience members, leading to an attempt to drown one other out with continuous catcalling.
Erik Satie	Mercure	June 15, 1924	Paris	The police were called to the premiere due to unruly behavior that sprang from the Parisian cultural infighting of the time.
George Antheil	Ballet Mécanique	June 19, 1926	Paris	The premiere performance received a large ovation despite some unruly behavior in the audience, including an outburst by Ezra Pound, but there were some fistfights in the street after the concert.
Alban Berg	Wozzeck	November 11, 1926	Prague	Musicologist Brian S. Locke called the "Wozzeck Affair" the "most important event at the Czechs' National Theater in the interwar period". Planned disruptions began in the sleeping soldiers' chorus (act 2) as Otakar Ostrčil conducted the Tuesday performance, favored by wealthy and upper-middle-class subscribers. Police cleared the audience, including Berg, his wife Helene, and their friend Alma Mahler. Amid anti-German sentiment and rising Czech fascism, politically polarized critics debated the opera before authorities forbade more performances.
Béla Bartók	The Miraculous Mandarin	November 27, 1926	Cologne	The plot caused a commotion in the audience, which began leaving during the performance.
Anton Webern	String Trio, Op. 20	September 13, 1928	Siena	The Kolisch Quartet's 1928 ISCM festival performance at the Palazzo Chigi-Saracini was disrupted by fist fights and a call for Benito Mussolini's intervention when the second movement began.
Kurt Weill	Rise and Fall of the City of Mahagonny	March 9, 1930	Leipzig	Organized bands of right-wing agitators planted themselves in the audience and created a large commotion, directed towards the opera's supposed anti-German sentiment. It was subsequently banned by the Nazis in 1933.
Igor Stravinsky	Danses concertantes	February 27, 1945	Paris	A group of students from Olivier Messiaen's class, including Serge Nigg and Pierre Boulez, protested noisily with police whistles against the neoclassical style of the compositions.
Igor Stravinsky	Four Norwegian Moods	March 15, 1945	Paris	Same as above.
Pierre Boulez	Polyphonie X	October 6, 1951	Donaueschingen	Musicologist Antoine Goléa, who attended the concert, recalled: "Those who experienced this Donaueschingen première will remember the scandal as long as they live. Shouts, caterwauling, and other animal noises were unleashed from one half of the hall in response to applause, foot-stamping and enthusiastic bravos from the other". Boulez was unable to attend, but, after hearing a tape of the concert, decided to withdraw the piece.
John Cage	4'33"	1952	New York	During the premiere of this piece, the audience grew agitated due to the complete silence. It consisted of three movements, and during the third movement audience members began to walk out of the performance.
Edgard Varèse	Déserts	December 2, 1954	Paris	The audience booed and jeered the piece.
Richard Wagner	Die Meistersinger von Nürnberg	1956 Bayreuth Festival	Bayreuth	A new interpretation of Die Meistersinger by Wagner's grandson Wieland Wagner removed elements associated with German nationalism and introduced a minimalist, modernist staging. Particularly controversial was the removal of scenery depicting Nuremberg – both the setting of the play and a city central to Nazi propaganda. The production was booed by the audience throughout the summer of 1956, beginning a tradition of booing at future Bayreuth Festivals.
Luigi Nono	Intolleranza 1960	April 13, 1961	Venice	The opera's premiere was disrupted by shouts from a neo-fascist faction in the audience.
John Cage	Atlas Eclipticalis	February 6, 1964	New York	Part of an avant-garde season of music featuring the New York Philharmonic conducted by Leonard Bernstein, most performances had received lukewarm responses. This one, with Cage as performer, was met with boos and hisses. Allegedly, the orchestra failed to take the music seriously, and in so doing, effectively sabotaged it. The event was recorded, and released as part of a Bernstein retrospective set.
Hans Werner Henze	Das Floß der Medusa	December 9, 1968	Hamburg	Students hung a Che Guevara banner, the Red, and Black flags, and after the chorus responded in protest, the police began making arrests, prompting Henze to cancel the concert.
Steve Reich	Four Organs	January 18, 1973	New York	At a Carnegie Hall performance of the work, the conservative audience tried yelling and sarcastically applauding to hasten the end of the piece, which received both boos and cheers during the ovation. One of the performers, Michael Tilson Thomas, recalls: "One woman walked down the aisle and repeatedly banged her head on the front of the stage, wailing 'Stop, stop, I confess.'"
Richard Wagner	Tristan und Isolde	1981	Tel Aviv, Israel	Disturbances broke out within the Mann Auditorium in Tel Aviv as Conductor Zubin Mehta led the Israel Philharmonic Orchestra with music by Richard Wagner. By tradition, Wagner's work had been banned by the Israeli orchestra since 1939 because of his anti-Semitic beliefs and the Nazi glorification of his music. Arguments broke out during and after the concert, with security guards wrestling protesters. Three musicians left their desks by prearrangement with the conductor.
John Adams	Grand Pianola Music	1982	New York	When the piece premiered at the Horizons Festival at Lincoln Center, the audience booed. Adams attributed the reaction to the contrast his work presented to the serialist pieces that had preceded it at the same concert.
Harrison Birtwistle	Panic	1995	London	The British Broadcasting Corporation received thousands of complaints after the piece's premiere was broadcast to millions on the Last Night of the Proms, which was typically programmed with patriotic standards rather than contemporary pieces.

== 21st century ==
Composer	Title	Date	Location	Details
Giuseppe Verdi	Aida	December 10, 2006	Milan	When tenor Roberto Alagna's opening aria "Celeste Aida" was booed by the loggionisti in the opera house's less expensive seats, he walked off stage while the music was still playing. Understudy Antonello Palombi, in a black dress shirt and slacks, came on a few seconds later to replace him. Alagna did not return to the production.
Steve Reich	Piano Phase	February 29, 2016	Cologne	During a performance of the piece by Iranian harpsichordist Mahan Esfahani in the Kölner Philharmonie, parts of the crowd clapped, whistled, and walked out. Esfahani, as he introduced the piece in English, had been ordered by a heckler to speak in German. Loud arguments between numerous members of the crowd persisted for several minutes; Esfahani stopped his performance and started playing a concerto by C. P. E. Bach instead. He attributed the 'pandemonium' to the choice of a modern composition, while the German media inferred a xenophobic motive.
Giacomo Puccini	Tosca	January 4, 2023	Barcelona	The controversy primarily stemmed from the unconventional staging of the opera at the Gran Teatre del Liceu. The production featured Mario Cavaradossi as an alter ego of Italian film director Pier Paolo Pasolini, who was murdered in 1975, trying to draw parallels between them as artists seen inconvenient to religious and political powers. Controversial scenes included many references to sexual violence and an invented scene of homosexual prostitution between Pasolini and his alleged killer while the song "Love in Portofino" played in the background. All this was met with substantial booing from the audience.
Piotr Tchaikovsky	Symphony No. 5	April 28, 2023	Los Angeles	During a quiet moment in the second movement, the audience was distracted by a woman's moan, which many surmised to be — in the words of composer and audience member Magnus Fiennes — a "loud and full body orgasm". The woman's motive was never identified, and some audience members suggested it could instead have been a sleep attack or other medical condition.
Mason Bates	The Amazing Adventures of Kavalier & Clay	September 21, 2025	New York	During an interval at the work's premiere at the Metropolitan Opera, US Senator Chuck Schumer was brought on stage to deliver remarks. He was heckled by supporters of fellow Democratic party member Zohran Mamdani, whom Schumer had declined to endorse as the party's candidate for mayor of New York.
Giacomo Puccini	Tosca	October 24, 2026	Calgary	On the production's closing night at the Southern Alberta Jubilee Auditorium, members of the audience waved Palestinian flags and yelled "Free Palestine" before being escorted out. The protest was a response to the events of the opening night: bass Gabriel Sanchez-Ortega, who was playing escaped political prisoner Cesare Angelotti, had unfurled a Palestinian flag at the curtain call and was fired from the production.

== See also ==
- Succès de scandale
