= Halcyon, California =

Unincorporated community in California

Halcyon
- Unincorporated community
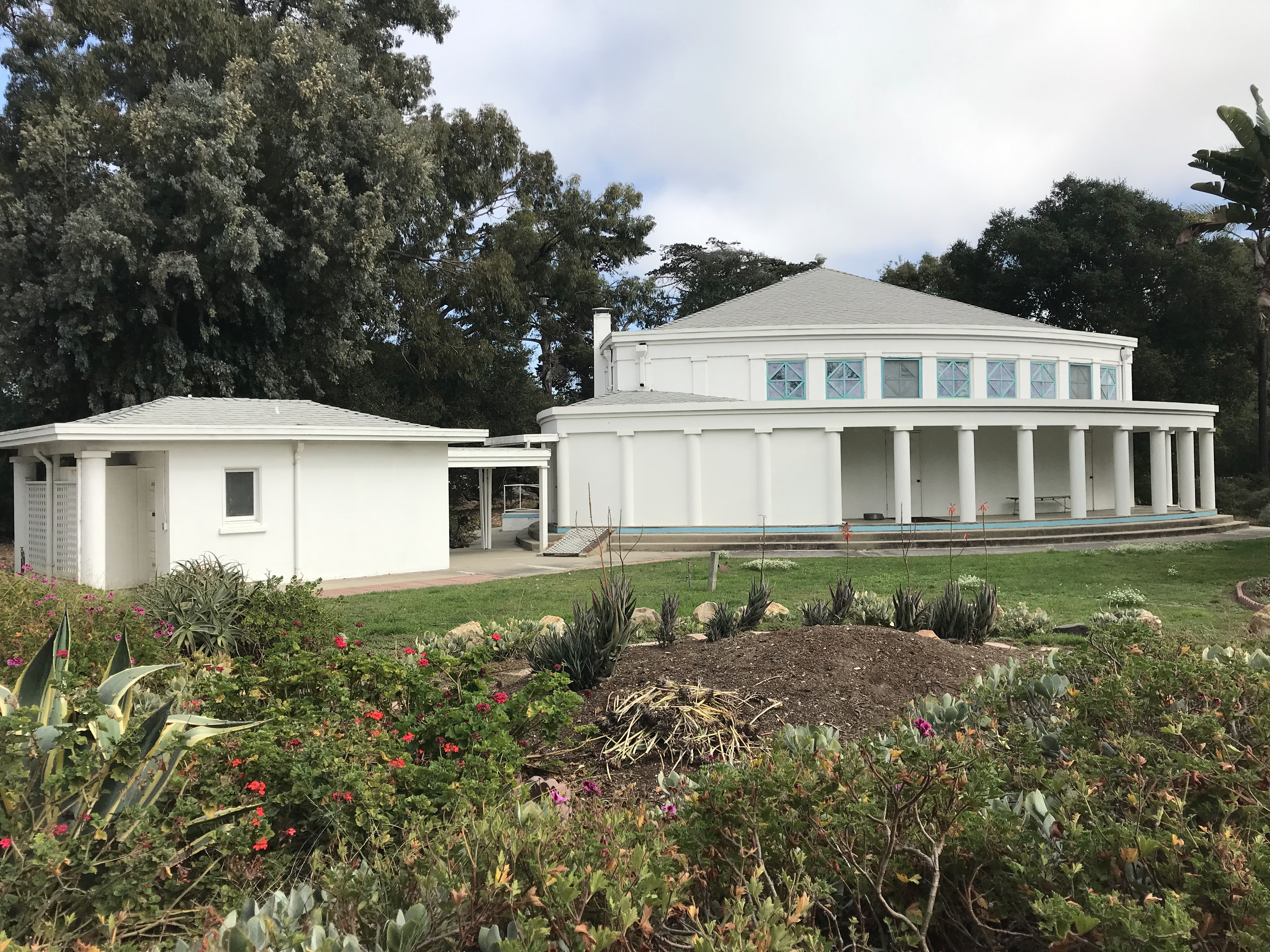
- Blue Star Memorial Temple

- Location in California
- Coordinates: 35°6′12″N 120°35′45″W
- Country: United States
- State: California
- County: San Luis Obispo
- Founded: 1903
- Time zone: UTC-8 (Pacific (PST))
  - Summer (DST): UTC-7 (PDT)
- ZIP codes: 93421
- GNIS feature ID: 1660712

Halcyon is an unincorporated community in San Luis Obispo County, California, United States, between Oceano and Arroyo Grande. Founded in 1903 as a Theosophical intentional community, it is the headquarters of the Temple of the People, a religious organization established in Syracuse, New York, in 1898.

The community developed around cooperative agriculture, a sanatorium, and the Temple's religious activities. Its residents and visitors included the poet John Varian and composer Henry Cowell. The 130-acre (53 ha) Halcyon Historic District, which includes the Blue Star Memorial Temple and other community buildings, was added to the National Register of Historic Places in 2017.

== History ==
=== Indigenous regional history ===
The surrounding Oceano dunes region is part of the homeland of the Northern Chumash, also known as the Obispeño. Their villages participated in trade linking coastal and inland communities, exchanging goods such as shell beads and stone for tools. Northern Chumash descendants continue to live in the region and participate in protecting its cultural and natural resources.

=== Founding and cooperative settlement ===
William Dower and Francia LaDue founded the Temple of the People in Syracuse, New York, in 1898. Both had belonged to the Theosophical Society. The organization began publishing its periodical, The Temple Artisan, in 1900. The group acquired the 200-acre (81 ha) Granville Shinn farm near Oceano and dedicated its Temple center at Halcyon on January 1, 1903. A headquarters cottage, completed that May, also accommodated LaDue and the community's early religious meetings.

The Temple Home Association, formed in 1903, organized a cooperative settlement. Members leased land from the association and undertook farming, poultry raising, printing, and craft work. A $100 membership provided a half-acre allotment and a vote in the association; members shared profits from its businesses and could also operate their own enterprises. Financial difficulties and disagreements led to the abandonment of cooperative business operations. By 1913, the association had become a landholding organization.

Dower directed the Halcyon Hotel and Sanatorium, which opened in May 1904 in the nearby Coffee Rice mansion. It treated patients with nervous disorders, alcoholism, and chronic illnesses. The sanatorium closed around 1933. Its premises continued to host community activities until the property was sold in 1949.

== Historic district and buildings ==
The Halcyon Historic District encompasses 130 acres (53 ha) of houses, community buildings, and agricultural land. Its National Register nomination identifies 1903–1949 as its period of significance. The district was listed on March 27, 2017.

The Blue Star Memorial Temple commemorates LaDue, who was known to Temple members as Blue Star and died in 1922. Architect Theodore Eisen designed the building. Construction began in January 1923, and the unfinished, roofless structure was consecrated on August 12 that year. The roof was added in 1924, when construction was completed. Its plan is a triangle with outward-curving sides, surrounded by a colonnaded porch. High windows admit light through opalescent glass.

A general store and post office opened in 1908. In 1947, salvageable portions of the original building were moved south to Halcyon Road and LaDue Street; the rebuilt structure also incorporated wood from the former Halcyon Pottery Works. Hiawatha Lodge was built in 1927 as a community center. The building housing the William Quan Judge Library was constructed in 1931–1932 as a guesthouse. Part of its ground floor was converted for the library in the late 1950s, and offices were added upstairs in the early 1970s.

== Arts and residents ==
Poet and playwright John Varian and his wife Agnes made their Halcyon home a gathering place for writers, artists, and musicians. Irish writer Ella Young was among those associated with this circle. Community theatrical productions combined music, poetry, and stage effects, including outdoor performances of Varian's plays. Henry Cowell, a frequent visitor who later owned a house in Halcyon, composed music for Varian's work and participated in the community's musical life.

John Varian's sons, Russell and Sigurd Varian, spent part of their youth in Halcyon. Working with William W. Hansen at Stanford University, they demonstrated the klystron in 1937. The brothers subsequently helped establish Varian Associates in 1948.

== Temple of the People ==
The Temple of the People maintains its headquarters in Halcyon. Its teachings draw on Theosophy, including beliefs in karma and reincarnation. Worship at the Blue Star Memorial Temple includes Sunday services, a monthly communion ceremony, and a daily healing service.

The organization's leader holds the title Guardian in Chief. Rick London succeeded Eleanor Shumway in December 2022. Shumway died on August 12, 2025.

Guardians in chief of the Temple of the People
Name	Tenure
Francia LaDue	1898–1922
William Dower	1922–1937
Pearl Dower	1937–1968
Harold Forgostein	1968–1990
Eleanor Shumway	1990–2022
Rick London	2022–present
