= Clarissa Dixon =

American anarchist and author (1851–1916)

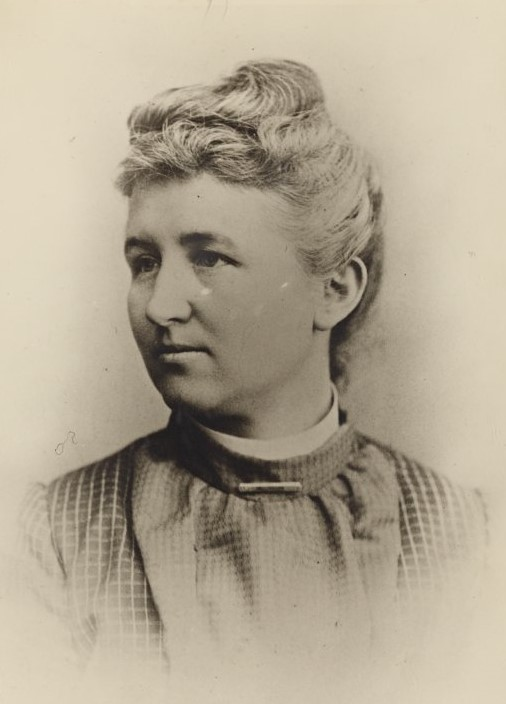
- Portrait of Dixon c. 1910
- Born: November 30, 1851; Hennepin, Illinois, U.S.
- Died: May 15, 1916 (aged 64); Menlo Park, California, U.S.
- Occupations: Author; activist; poet; teacher
- Spouses: George Davidson (m. 1869; div. 1890) Harry Cowell (m. 1893; div. 1903)
- Children: 2 (including Henry Cowell)
- Writing career
- Notable works: Janet and Her Dear Phebe (1909)

Clara "Clarissa" Belnap Dixon (Note: Dixon would change her surname after both her marriages, with her going by Clarissa Davidson (1869–92) and Clarissa Cowell (1893–1903).) (Note: Some sources incorrectly spell the middle name as Belknap.) (November 30, 1851 – May 15, 1916) was an American anarchist philosopher, labor activist, feminist and writer who lived at various times in the Great Plains and California. She dedicated much of her life for writing articles advocating for socialism, personal memoirs, and incidental poetry. She was the mother of avant-garde composer Henry Cowell.

== Early life ==
=== Childhood ===
Clara Belnap Dixon was born on November 30, 1851, in Hennepin, Illinois, a small town on the Illinois River about forty miles north of Bloomington, to woodworker Samuel Asenath Dixon and Bethshua Dixon (née Nash). The family's ancestry was of mostly Scotch and Irish descent, but Samuel's lineage was partially English and had been in America for centuries, with figures including astronomer Jeremiah Dixon, one of the surveyors behind the American Mason–Dixon line.

Clarissa was the second of five children born to Samuel and Bethshua. The family moved at some point, to let all the children to attend free public school and church in the small village of Amityville, near Eddyville, Iowa. The area was an unassuming Midwestern plains farming community some forty miles southeast of Des Moines, which suited the young couple's rural sensibilities. She was raised in a strict fundamentalist Christian household.

Frustrated by her parents' beliefs, she renounced her church membership and left the town at age seventeen, relocating to the nearby city of Kirkville in Wapello County. It was there where she met George Davidson, a young farmhand. They were wed in 1869 and had their only son, Clarence, little more than a year later in 1871. At the same time, Clarissa decided to seek a thorough education at the age of nineteen, and attended a private school in nearby Ottumwa. She later became one of the six teachers in all of Eddyville, working for around eight years largely in small, one-room country schools.

=== Early activism ===
As a young woman, Dixon regularly attended labor movement, communist, and anarchist gatherings in Chicago. Using a toy typesetting device, she produced a political leaflet, functioning as an unsalaried specialist and representative regarding labor reform and women's suffrage for local newspapers. Her devotion to these reforms led her to voluntarily write for these publications – such as The Chicago Sentinel, The American Nonconformist, and The Iowa Farmers' Tribune — papers that circulated widely but didn't pay their writers.

As early as 1883, Dixon's politically charged essays and manifestos were attracting both praise and scorn from around the country. She was being solicited by papers and magazines from the nation's largest cities, though her popularity mainly rested among the more impoverished communities of the northern Midwest. In 1889 she would join Sigismund Danielewicz's new California-based anarchist paper The Beacon. Dixon became a semi-regular contributor to The Beacon while still living in distant Kirkville, Iowa.

== Settling in California ==
=== Burgeoning career ===
Urging to escape the Midwest and its fundamentalist atmosphere, she took the train alone to San Francisco in 1890, a city with a then-lively colony of unconventional writers. Dixon, it has been suggested, may have been specifically drawn to the bohemianism of the literary community, but it's unknown precisely which aspects of the city and California more broadly appealed to her. After moving to California, Danielewicz handed over The Beacon's printing equipment and subscription list to her. Dixon's friendships during this period included the writers Jack London, George Sterling and Ambrose Bierce.

While in San Francisco, she teamed up with a young Irish immigrant, Harry Cowell, to found the fortnightly anarchist paper, Enfant Terrible. She used this opportunity to provide a more unfiltered and strong-willed disposition. Her style of writing and use of propaganda is exemplified in one of Enfant Terrible's first 1891 publications:

The clergyman has no more right than the clown to marry people. The judge has no more right than the jail-bird to sentence people. The policeman has no more right than the pauper to arrest people. The tax collector has no more right than any other thief to filch people's property. The legislator has no more right than the lackey to make laws. I have no reverence for God, nor parents, nor sovereigns, nor presidents, nor popes, nor bishops, nor dead bodies, nor ancient institutions; in short, I have no reverence for any person or thing.

As well as in a 1892 article from the Boston journal Liberty:

The State uses money robbed from the parents to perpetuate its powers of robbery by instructing their children in its own interest. The church also, uses its power to perpetuate its power. And to these twin leeches... are the tender minds of babies entrusted for education.

Dixon opposed the revolutionary philosophy of socialism, calling for a more "evolutionary" than "revolutionary" transformation, reinforcing education and cultivation of individual freedom over insurrection, achieving utopia via gradual reform. She ended a treatise in The Enquirer by advocating for men and women to organize with the call, "Working people of the world, unite; you have only your chains to lose, you have a world to win."

=== Marriage and continued work ===
Dixon and Cowell would marry in 1893. She lost most of her possessions in the 1906 San Francisco earthquake and fire. She would flee the state and settle with her mother's family in the American Plains and Midwest, later settling briefly in New York City.

She released her only published book in February 1909, the sapphic feminist novel Janet and Her Dear Phebe, which The New York Times characterized at the time as, "a very intense sort of a love story in which the lovers are two little girls who are devoted to each other with that fervency known only to feminine childhood". The Frederick A. Stokes Company would contractually pay her $100 for the novel, but after poor sales, she received no royalties and the publishing company refused multiple manuscripts for new material she sent them over the following four years.

== Later life ==
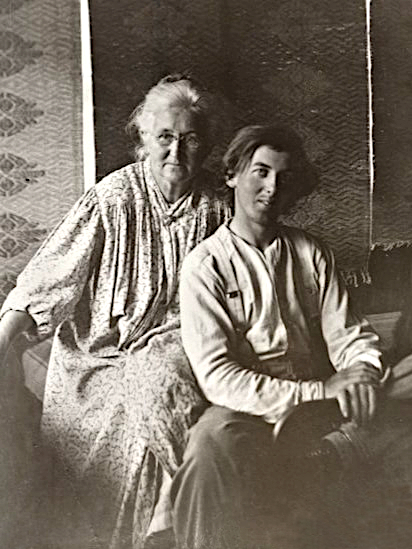
Dixon and her son Henry in Menlo Park, California, 1915.

=== Raising Henry ===
Dixon's second child, Henry Dixon Cowell, was born in 1897, at which point she was forty-six years old. The married Cowell couple built a crude cottage on the outskirts of Menlo Park, California. Clarissa took a particular interest in anti-authoritarian relations between parents and children, adopting a Spencerian approach to raising the young boy, writing, "[Spencer] has shown that the status of women and children improves in proportion to the decline of militarism and the advance of industrialism."

Due to an ongoing affair between Harry and a French mistress, the Cowells amicably divorced in 1903, by which time Henry was five years old. Clarissa from then on raised Henry as a single mother.

=== Death and legacy ===
In 1914, Dixon began a typed manuscript of biographical details of her son Henry's early life, which she completed before her death from breast cancer in 1916, at age 64.

In the years following her death, Henry sold Clarissa's poetry collection. He additionally set sixteen of his mother's poems to music.

== See also ==
- Anarchism in the United States
- History of the socialist movement in the United States
