= Henry Cowell =

American composer (1897–1965)

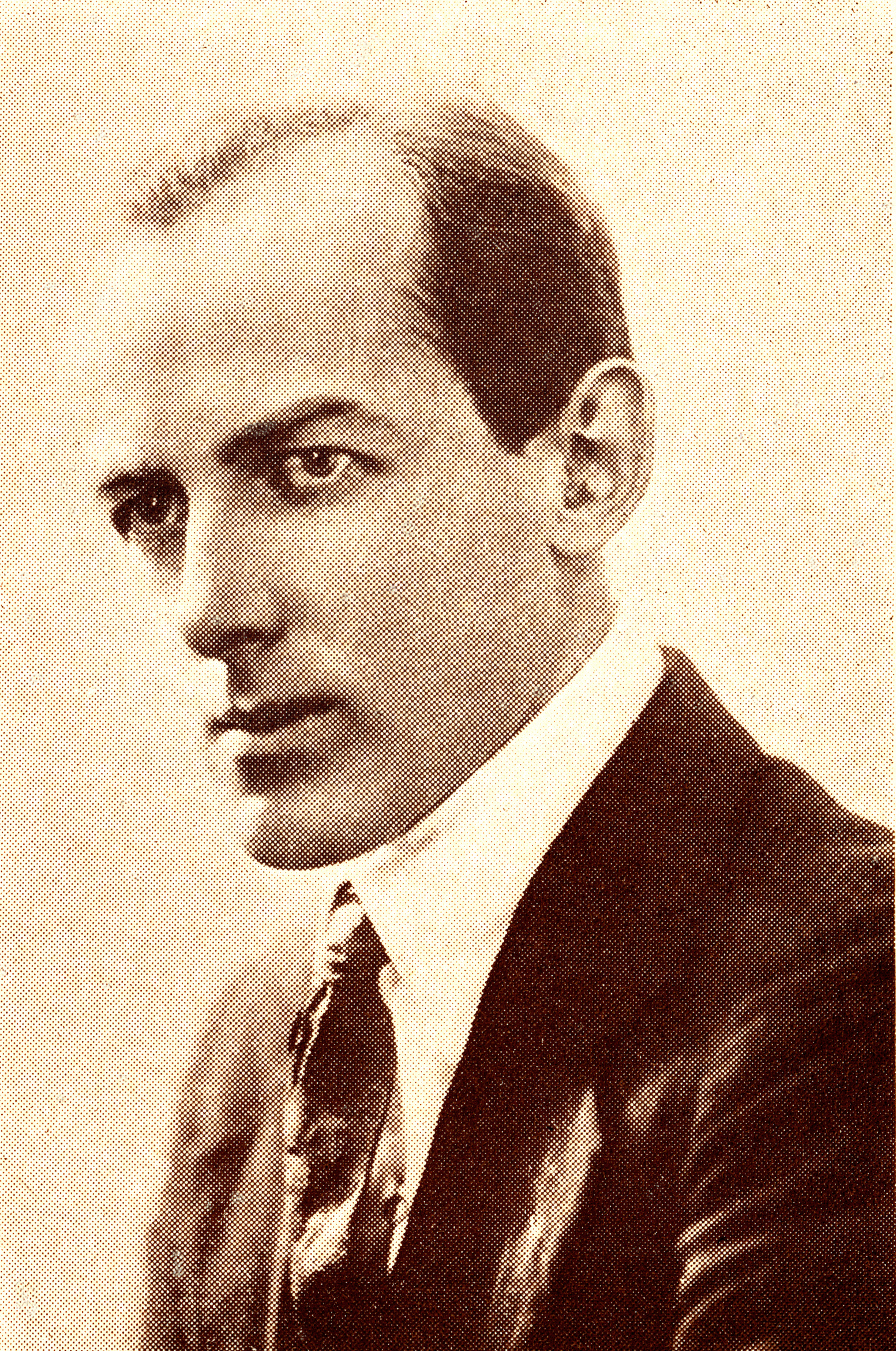
- Photo from promotional flier for Cowell's 1924 Carnegie Hall debut
- Born: Henry Dixon Cowell; March 11, 1897; Menlo Park, California, U.S.
- Died: December 10, 1965 (aged 68); Woodstock, New York, U.S.
- Occupations: Composer; writer; pianist; publisher; teacher
- Spouse: Sidney Robertson (m. 1941)
- Parent(s): Harry Cowell; Clarissa Dixon

Signature
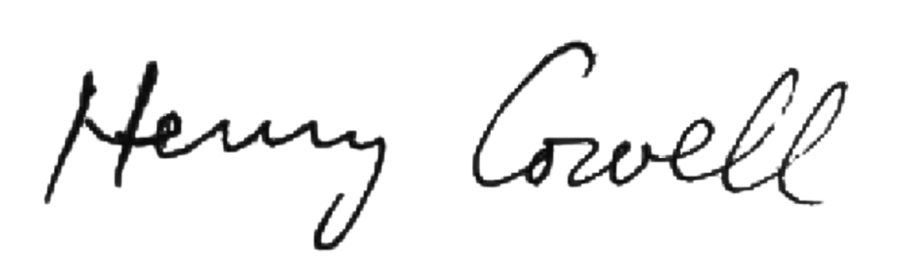

Henry Dixon Cowell (/ˈkaʊəl/; March 11, 1897 – December 10, 1965) was an American composer, writer, pianist, publisher, and music teacher. Earning a reputation as an extremely controversial performer and eccentric composer, Cowell became a leading figure of American avant-garde music for the first half of the 20th century. His writings and music served as a great influence on composers such as Lou Harrison, George Antheil, and John Cage. He is considered one of the most important and influential composers from the United States.

Cowell was mostly self-taught and developed a unique musical language, often blending folk melodies, dissonant counterpoint, unconventional orchestration, and influences from ancient Celtic religion. He was an early proponent and innovator of many modernist compositional techniques and sensibilities, including string piano, prepared piano, tone clusters, and graphic notation. The Tides of Manaunaun, originally a theatrical prelude, is the best-known and most widely-performed of Cowell's tone cluster pieces for piano.

He was married to ethnomusicologist Sidney Robertson Cowell.

== Early life ==
=== Childhood ===
Cowell was born on March 11, 1897, in rural Menlo Park, California. His father, Henry Blackwood "Harry" Cowell, was a romantic poet and then-recent immigrant from County Clare, Ireland. His mother, Clara "Clarissa" Cowell (née Dixon), was a political activist, author, and native of the Great Plains. She was 46 when she gave birth to Henry and over ten years older than her husband. Clarissa's ancestry was similarly Scottish and Irish, although her paternal lineage had been in America for centuries, with figures including Jeremiah Dixon. After meeting for the first time, the two quickly wed and undertook bohemian lifestyles, residing in a small, crude cottage Harry had built on the outskirts of the city and where Henry would eventually be born. It was in his first few years that Henry had his first exposure to music.

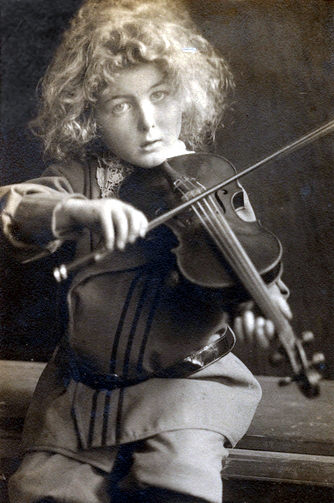
Henry playing the violin — aged 5 (c. 1902)

His parents often sang to him the folk songs of their native homelands, and he was soon able to recite them before he learned to speak. During occasional visits to downtown San Francisco, he also recalled hearing the traditional music of Indonesia, China, Japan, and others. The family was gifted small instruments by friends and neighbors, including a mandolin harp and a quarter-size violin, the latter of which the young Henry took an interest in, making it his instrument of choice for a few years. His mother eventually decided to stop both the private lessons and his public school career after Cowell had severe bouts of Sydenham's chorea and scarlet fever — from which he eventually recovered.

Due to an ongoing affair between Harry and a French mistress, the Cowells amicably divorced in 1903, by which time Henry was 5. He was thereafter raised in Chinatown by his mother, who imbued him with her strong anarchist and feminist beliefs. It was during this time he exhibited a strong defiance of gender stereotypes — he refused to have his hair cut, often wore women's clothing and adored the color pink while preferring to be called "Mrs. Jones". He also had further music exposures when engaging with his new Asian-American friends and their families in the neighborhood. After the 1906 San Francisco Earthquake, much of the Cowells' possessions and memorabilia were destroyed in the ensuing fire, after which Henry and his mother fled California. With no permanent place to live, Henry resided with his mother's family and friends around the American Plains and Midwest, later in New York City. School teachers of this time often took note of his "musical genius" and eccentric personality that was hindered by "extreme poverty". Lewis Terman, an eventual pioneer of the IQ test, met with the young Henry during the family's brief stay in rural Iowa. He would posit that Cowell had, "language almost literary. No college professor of English could have improved upon it. And it was so natural. His conversation breathes intelligence. I had the feeling that no unschooled boy who was not a genius of the first order could speak thus" and, "Although the IQ is satisfactory, it is matched by scores of others. [...] But there is only one Henry." Clarissa's career as a progressive feminist writer did not earn her much money, and by the time they eventually returned to San Francisco, she had become terminally ill with breast cancer. They found their home destroyed from the prior earthquake, and looted by vandals after standing unoccupied for so long. Neighbors housed the two as the then thirteen-year-old Henry restored it. In order to keep them financially afloat, he took up small jobs such as picking and selling flower bulbs at the Menlo Park Train Station, janitorial work, farming, and cleaning a neighbor's chicken houses.

=== Education and early career ===
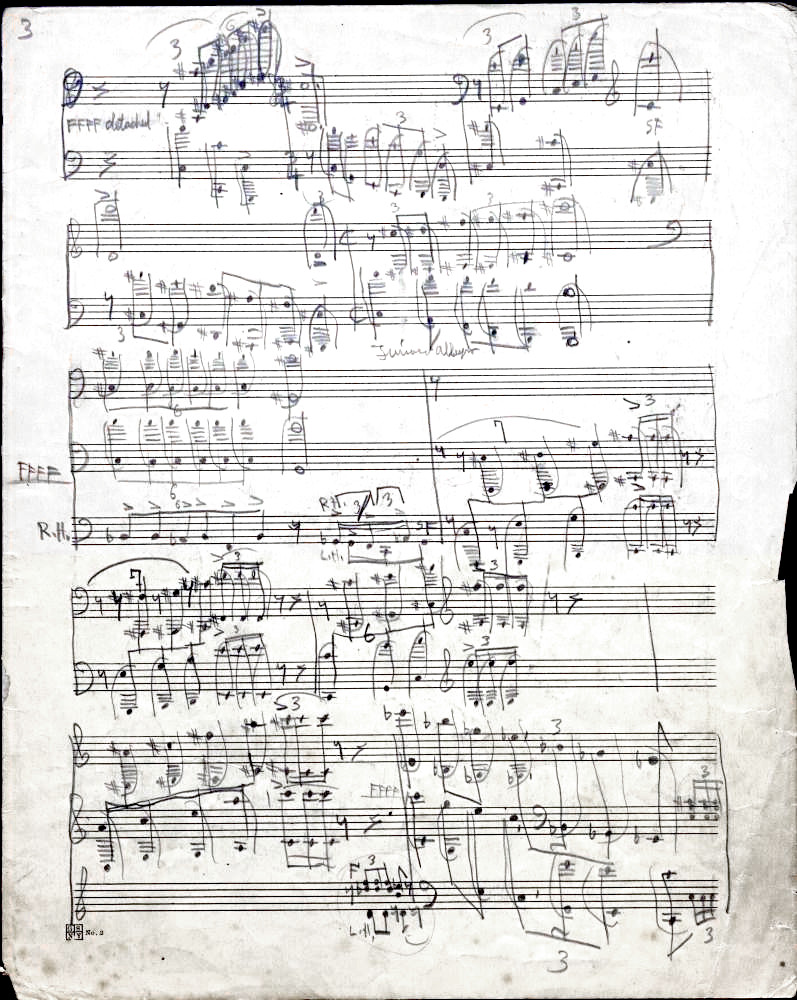
The original manuscript to Dynamic Motion (1916), showing the young Cowell's early methods for notating large piano clusters

While receiving no formal musical education and little schooling of any kind beyond his mother's home tutelage, Cowell began to compose in his mid-teens. Cowell saved what money he could from odd jobs, and at the age of fifteen, purchased a used upright piano for $60. The piano significantly aided his compositional output — by 1914, he had written over 100 pieces, including his first surviving piece for solo piano, the repetitive Anger Dance (originally Mad Dance). (Note: Cowell describes the inspiration for the piece in the commentary track he recorded for Folkways in 1963: "The Anger Dance was composed at a time when I had been very much annoyed by the fact that a doctor to whom I showed a bent-up leg suggested that it should be cut off immediately. And since I didn't in the least approve of this, and thinking of it over and over again made me more and more angry, I stomped home on my crutches, and the phrases of the Anger Dance went through my mind louder and louder as I walked home" (track 20/5:06–5:41). Cowell biographer Michael Hicks (2002) describes the work as one of Cowell's "most prescient" and "proto-minimalist" (p. 60). The piece's structure does anticipate minimalist procedures, and an interpretation by Steffen Schleiermacher from 1993 is simultaneously metronomic and jazzy in a way that reveals its kinship with the work of Steve Reich, in particular. But in his own 1963 recording, Cowell expresses a torment, through jagged tempi and ambivalent dynamics (all clearly purposeful), that renders Anger Dance very different in character from the work of the American minimalists.) He would begin experimenting in earnest, often by slamming the keyboard with all his strength, and rolling his mother's darning egg across the strings. In the same year, at the age of 17, Cowell enrolled at the University of California, Berkeley, studying composition with renowned American musicologist and composer Charles Seeger. Seeger later made note of their "concurrent but entirely separate pursuit[s] of free composition and academic disciplines." After showing Seeger the drafts of his music, he encouraged Cowell to write about the methods and theory behind his tone clusters, which later became the draft for his book New Musical Resources.

Still a teenager, Cowell wrote the piano piece Dynamic Motion (1916), his first important work to explore the possibilities of the tone cluster. It requires the performer to use both forearms to play massive secundal chords and calls for keys to be held down without sounding for sympathetic resonance. After two years at Berkeley, Seeger recommended that Cowell study at the Institute of Musical Art (later the Juilliard School) in New York City. Cowell only studied there for three months (October 1916 to January 1917) before dropping out, believing the musical atmosphere was too stifling and uninspiring. It was in New York, however, where he met fellow modernist piano composer Leo Ornstein. The two would collaborate in later decades.

In February 1917, Cowell enlisted in the army to avoid being drafted into World War I and seeing direct military combat. He served in the ambulance training facility at Camp Crane in Allentown, Pennsylvania, where he had a short stint as the assistant band director for a few months. In October 1918, Cowell was transferred to Fort Ontario in Oswego, New York. He was transferred just before the Spanish flu pandemic killed thirteen men at Camp Crane.

=== Time at Halcyon ===
Cowell soon returned to California, where he had become involved with Halcyon, a theosophical community in Southern California. Cowell joined the commune after befriending Irish-American poet and former Menlo Park resident John Osborne Varian. Cowell's connection to Irish folk music from his father meant he was instantly drawn to Varian, Irish nationalism, Celtic legends, and theosophy more broadly. Although the residents at Halcyon embraced a tolerant and communist-leaning lifestyle, their music preferences were considered quite conservative for the time. Varian described it as "sangtified raggtime [sic]" and, "rehymnified hymn music [sic]." Cowell managed to convince members to embrace his music, and wrote incidental and programmatic music to be performed at Halcyon. In 1917, Cowell wrote the music for Varian's stage production The Building of Banba; the prelude he composed, The Tides of Manaunaun, with its rich, evocative clusters, would become Cowell's most famous and widely performed work. Irish symbology later became a broader theme in his music, as an unwitting extension of the Celtic Revival movement of the 20th century.

== Musical career ==
=== New music and first tours ===
Beginning in the early 1920s, Cowell toured widely in North America and Europe as a pianist, with the financial aid of his former tutors — playing his own experimental works, seminal explorations of atonality, polytonality, polyrhythms, and non-Western modes. He gave his debut recital in New York, toured through France and Germany, and became the first American musician to visit the Soviet Union, with many of these concerts sparking large uproars and protests. It was on one of these tours that in 1923, his friend Richard Buhlig introduced Cowell to young pianist Grete Sultan in Berlin. They worked closely together — an aspect vital to Sultan's personal and artistic development. Cowell later made such an impression with his tone cluster technique that prominent European composers Béla Bartók and Alban Berg requested his permission to adopt it.

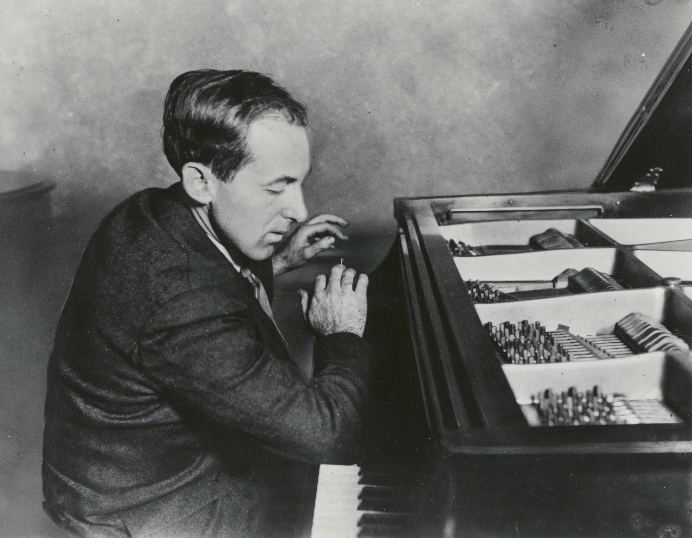
Cowell playing the piano, demonstrating his "forearm" technique by slamming down with his right arm on the middle register, c. 1920s

In a letter addressed to his friend on January 10, 1924, Cowell wrote, "I kicked up quite a stir in London and Berlin, and had some very good, and some very bad notices from both places." A new method advanced by Cowell during this period, in pieces such as Aeolian Harp (1923) and Fairy Answer (1929), was what he dubbed "string piano" — rather than using the keys to play, the pianist reaches inside the instrument and plucks, sweeps, and otherwise manipulates the strings directly. Cowell's endeavors with string piano techniques were the primary inspiration for John Cage's development of the prepared piano. In early chamber music pieces, such as Quartet Romantic (1915–17) and Quartet Euphometric (1916–19), Cowell pioneered a compositional approach he called "rhythm-harmony": "Both quartets are polyphonic, and each melodic strand has its own rhythm," he explained. "Even the canon in the first movement of the Romantic has different note-lengths for each voice."

In 1919, Cowell began writing New Musical Resources, which was finally published after extensive revision in 1930. In the book, Cowell discussed the variety of innovative rhythmic and harmonic concepts he used in his compositions (and others that were still entirely speculative). He talks about harmonic series and "the influence [it] has exerted on music throughout its history, how many musical materials of all ages are related to it, and how, by various means of applying its principles in many different manners, a large palette of musical materials can be assembled." It would have a powerful effect on the American musical avant-garde for decades after. John Cage hand-copied the book and later studied Cowell, and Conlon Nancarrow would refer to it years later as having "the most influence of anything I've ever read in music."

=== The Leipzig incident ===
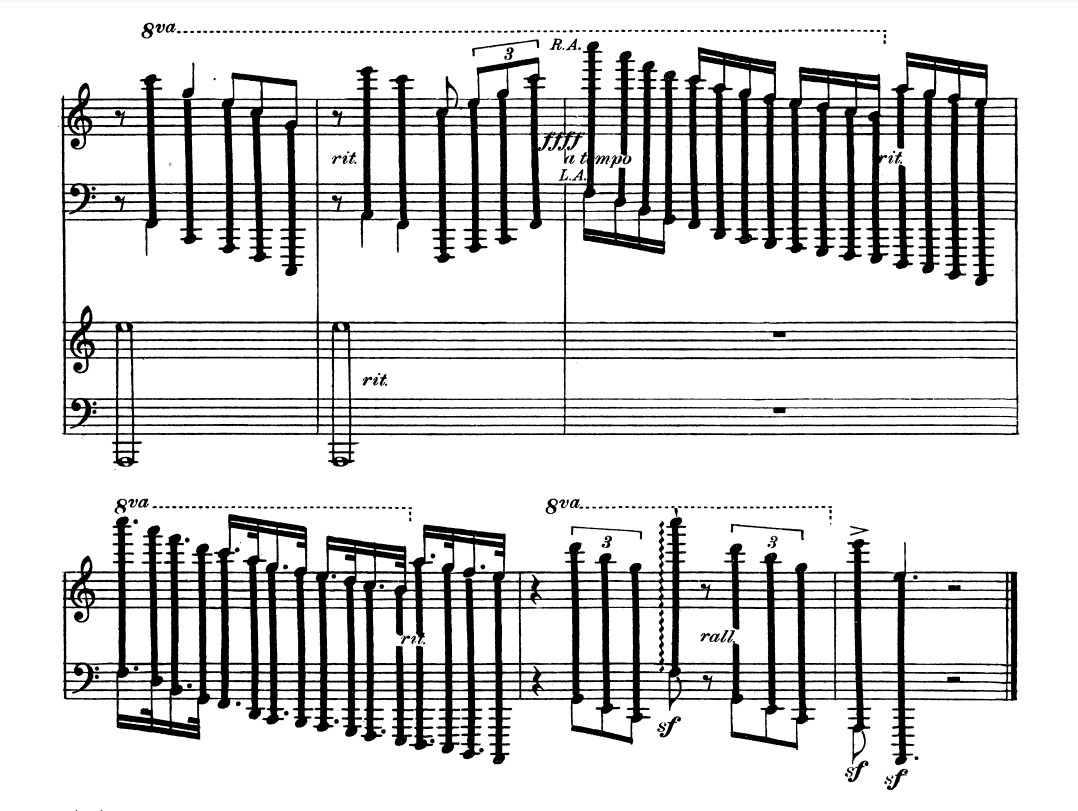
The finale of the movement Antinomy from Five Encores to Dynamic Motion (1917), showing five-and-a-half octave chromatic clusters to be played with both forearms

During his first tour in Europe, Cowell played at the famous Gewandhaus in Leipzig, Germany, on October 15, 1923. He received a notoriously hostile reception during this concert, with some modern musicologists and historians referring to the event as a turning point in Cowell's performing career. As he progressed further into the concert, deliberately saving the loudest and most provocative pieces for last, the audience's reception became more and more audible. Gasps and screams were heard, and Cowell recalled hearing a man in the front rows threaten to physically remove him from the stage if he did not stop. While playing the fourth movement Antinomy (Note: Often misspelled in some articles and music programs as "Antimony".) from his Five Encores to Dynamic Motion, he later recalled:

[...] the audience was yelling and stamping and clapping and hissing until I could hardly hear myself. They stood up during most of the performance and got as near to me and the piano as they could. [...] Some of those who disapproved of my methods were so excited that they almost threatened me with physical violence. Those who liked the music restrained them.

During this excitement, a man jumped up from one of the front rows and shook his fist at Cowell and said, "Halten Sie uns für Idioten in Deutschland?" ("Do you take us for idiots in Germany?"), while others threw the concert's program notes and other paraphernalia at his face. About a minute later, an angry group of audience members clambered onto the stage, with a second, more supportive group following. The two groups began shouting over and confronting one another, which eventually turned into a large physical confrontation and riot on the stage, after which the Leipzig police were promptly called. Cowell later recalled of the incident, "The police came onto the stage and arrested 20 young fellows, the audience being in an absolute state of hysteria — and I was still playing!" As he had no severe physical injuries, the Leipzig authorities decided not to admit him to the local medical facility. After the concert had concluded and the stage was cleared, he was noticeably shaken and jittery as he took his bow for the remaining audience and then left the hall.

In the days following, the local Leipzig press was incredibly harsh regarding Cowell, the performance, and his musical style more broadly. The Leipziger Abendpost called the event, "[...] such a meaningless strumming and such a repulsive hacking of the keyboard not only with hands, but also even with fists, forearms and elbows, that one must call it a coarse obscenity — to put it mildly — to offer such a cacophony to the public, who in the end took it as a joke." The Leipziger Neuste-Nachrichten additionally referred to his techniques as "musical grotesqueries". Comparisons were later made between this event and other riotous performances by experimental composers in Europe, including the Paris premiere of Igor Stravinsky's The Rite of Spring a decade earlier and the musical performances of Italian Futurist artist Luigi Russolo.

=== Further experimentation ===
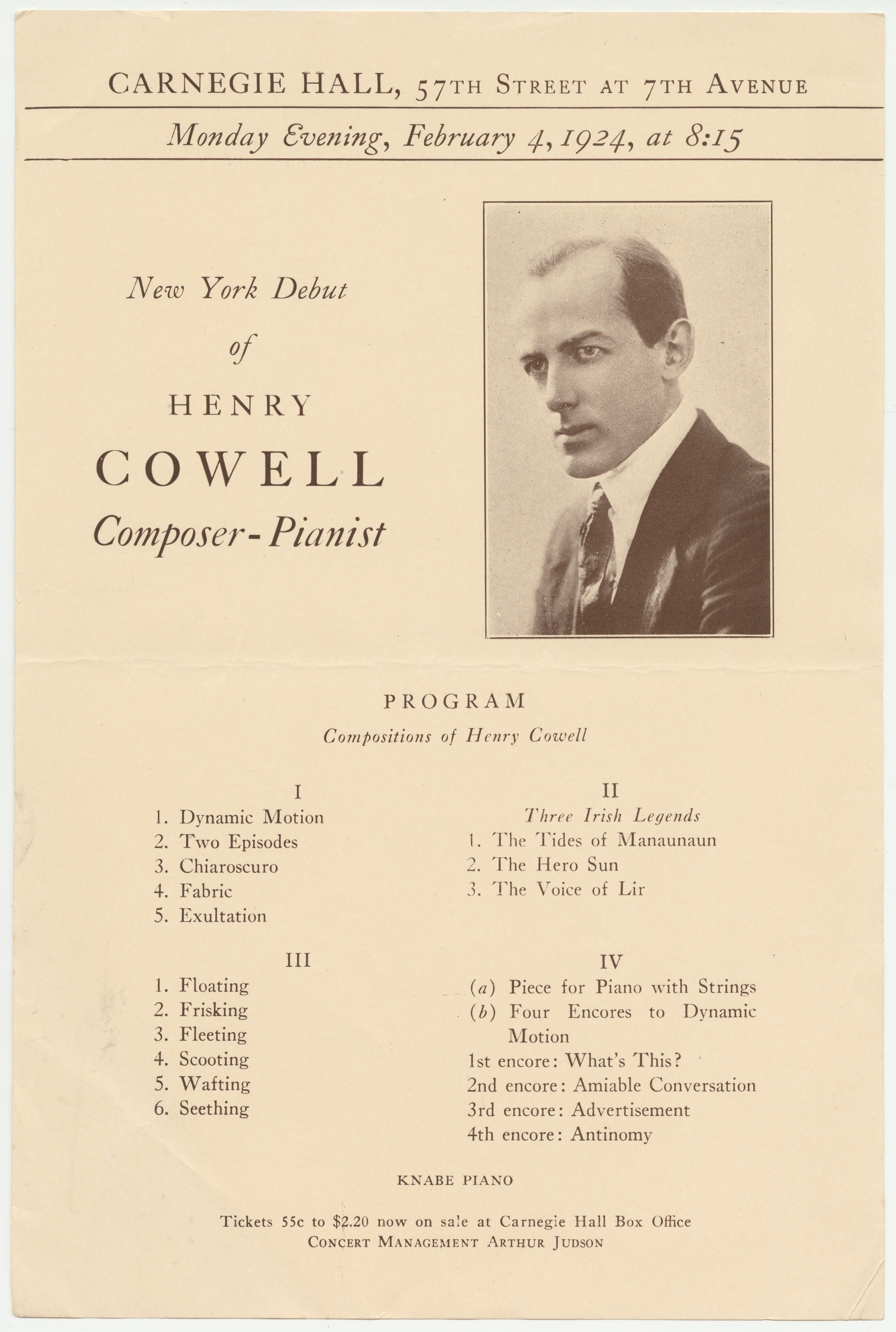
Promotional flier for Cowell's 1924 Carnegie Hall debut (Note: Only four of the five written encores to Dynamic Motion — which excluded Time Table — were played at the debut, at the direction of Cowell.)

Cowell's interest in harmonic rhythm, as discussed in New Musical Resources, led him in 1930 to commission Leon Theremin to invent the Rhythmicon, or Polyrhythmophone, a transposable keyboard instrument capable of playing notes in periodic rhythms proportional to the overtone series of a chosen fundamental. The world's first electronic rhythm machine, with a photoreceptor-based sound production system proposed by Cowell, it could produce up to sixteen different rhythmic patterns simultaneously, complete with optional syncopation. Cowell wrote several original compositions for the instrument, including an orchestrated concerto, and Theremin built two more models. Soon, however, the Rhythmicon would be virtually forgotten until the 1960s, when English music producer Joe Meek experimented with its rhythmic concept.

Cowell pursued a radical compositional approach through the mid-1930s, with solo piano pieces remaining at the heart of his output — important works from this era include The Banshee, requiring numerous playing methods such as pizzicato and longitudinal sweeping and scraping of the strings, and the manic, cluster-filled Tiger (1930), inspired by William Blake's "The Tyger". Much of Cowell's public reputation continued to be based on his trademark pianistic technique: a critic for the San Francisco News, writing in 1932, referred to Cowell's "famous 'tone clusters,' probably the most startling and original contribution any American has yet contributed to the field of music." A prolific composer of songs (he would write over 180 during his career), Cowell returned in 1930–31 to Aeolian Harp, adapting it as the accompaniment to a vocal setting of a poem by his father, How Old Is Song? He built on his substantial oeuvre of chamber music, with pieces such as the Adagio for Cello and Thunder Stick (1924) that explored unusual instrumentation and others that were even more progressive: Six Casual Developments (1933), for clarinet and piano, sounds like something Jimmy Giuffre would compose thirty years later. His Ostinato Pianissimo (1934) placed him in the vanguard of those writing original scores for percussion ensemble. He created forceful large-ensemble pieces during this period as well, such as the Concerto for Piano and Orchestra (1928) — with its three movements, "Polyharmony," "Tone Cluster," and "Counter Rhythm" — and the Sinfonietta (1928), whose scherzo Anton Webern conducted in Vienna. In the early 1930s, Cowell began to delve seriously into aleatoric procedures, creating opportunities for performers to determine primary elements of a score's realization. (Note: It is possible that Cowell had earlier dabbled in a more whimsical form of aleatory. The liner notes to the Folkways Henry Cowell: Piano Music, written in 1963 and revised in 1993, assert that each phrase of Anger Dance "may be repeated many times, depending on how angry the player is able to feel." Of Advertisement (Third Encore to Dynamic Motion) (1917, not 1914 as the liner notes state) — which Cowell called "a satire on repititious advertisement of a raucous nature" (track 20/2:14–2:20) — it is likewise said that "there is a section that may be repeated, to emphasize the absurdity, as many times as the performer likes." Nicholls (1991) notes that, in fact, the published score of Anger Dance "gives specific instructions regarding the number of repetitions each musical fragment should be subjected to" (p. 167). He observes, however, that Cowell in his own recording of the piece reiterates certain phrases beyond the specified number.) One of his major chamber pieces, the Mosaic Quartet (String Quartet No. 3) (1935), is scored as a collection of five movements with no preordained sequence.

=== New Music Society and impresario work ===
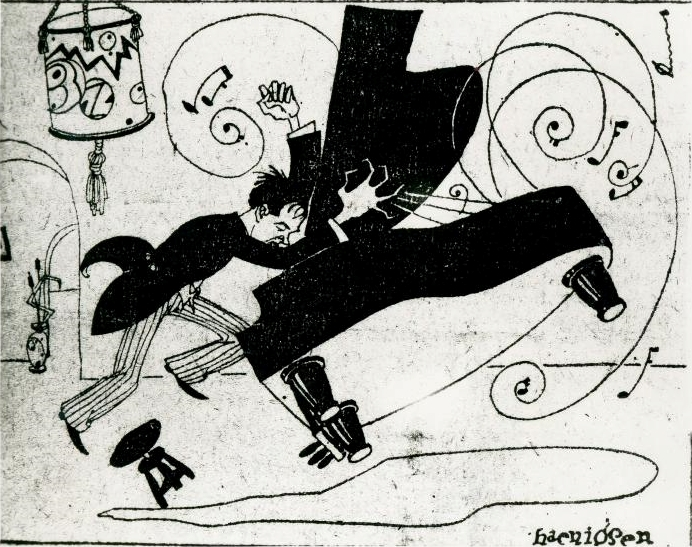
Satirical caricature of Cowell at the piano by Harry Haenigsen, c. mid-1920s

Cowell was the central figure in a circle of avant-garde composers that included his good friends Carl Ruggles and Dane Rudhyar, as well as Leo Ornstein, John Becker, Colin McPhee, French expatriate Edgard Varèse, Ruth Crawford (whom he convinced Charles Seeger to take on as a student), and Johanna Beyer. Cowell and his circle were sometimes referred to in the press as "ultra-modernists," a label whose definition is flexible and origin unclear (it has also been applied to a few composers outside the immediate circle, such as George Antheil, and to some of its disciples, such as Nancarrow); Virgil Thomson styled them the "rhythmic research fellows." In 1925, Cowell organized the New Music Society, one of whose primary activities was staging concerts of their works, along with those of artistic allies such as Wallingford Riegger and Arnold Schoenberg — the latter of whom would later ask Cowell to play for his composition class during one of his European tours. Less than two years later, Cowell founded the periodical New Music Quarterly, which would publish many significant new scores under his editorship, both by the ultra-modernists and many other composers, including Ernst Bacon, Paul Bowles, Aaron Copland, Otto Luening and Gerald Strang. Before the publication of the first issue, he solicited contributions from a then-obscure composer who became one of his closest friends, Charles Ives. Major scores by Ives, including the Comedy from his fourth symphony, Fourth of July, 34 Songs, and 19 Songs, would receive their first publication in New Music; in turn, Ives provided financial support to a number of Cowell's projects (including, years later, New Music itself). Many of the scores published in Cowell's journal were made even more widely available as performances of them were issued by the record label he established in 1934, New Music Recordings.

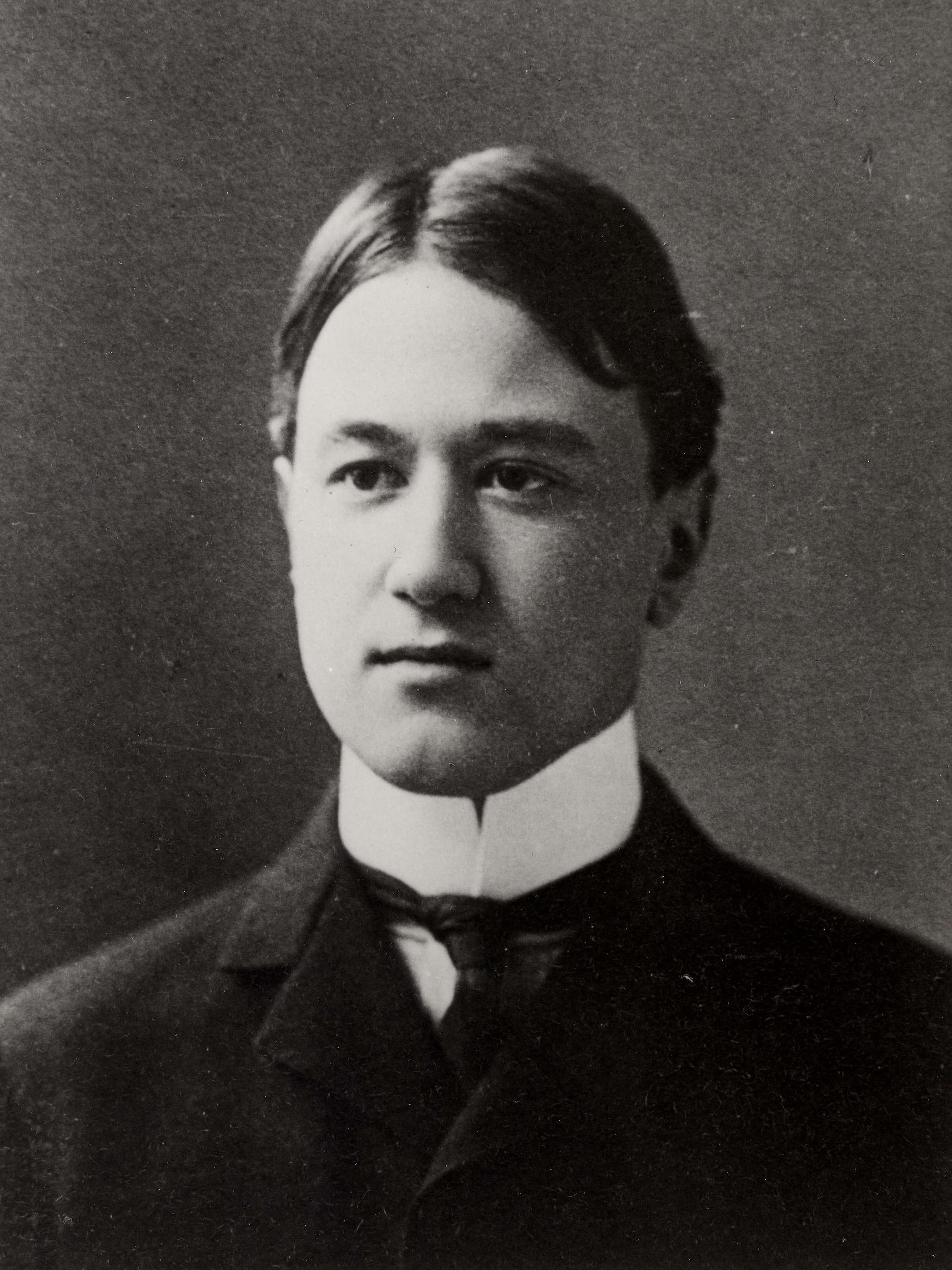
Cowell was dedicated to publishing and popularizing the music of Charles Ives (pictured) via New Music Quarterly

The ultra-modernist movement had expanded its reach in 1928, when Cowell led a group that included Ruggles, Varèse, his fellow expatriate Carlos Salzedo, American composer Emerson Whithorne, and Mexican composer Carlos Chávez in founding the Pan-American Association of Composers, dedicated to promoting composers from around the Western Hemisphere and creating a community among them that would transcend national lines. Its inaugural concert, held in New York City in March 1929, featured exclusively Latin American music, including works by Chávez, Brazilian composer Heitor Villa-Lobos, Cuban composer Alejandro García Caturla, and the French-born Cuban Amadeo Roldán. Its next concert, in April 1930, focused on the U.S. ultra-modernists, with works by Cowell, Crawford, Ives, Rudhyar, and others such as Antheil, Henry Brant, and Vivian Fine. Over the next four years, Nicolas Slonimsky conducted concerts sponsored by the association in New York, across Europe, and, in 1933, Cuba. Cowell himself had performed there in 1930 and met with Caturla, whom he was publishing in New Music. Cowell continued to work on both his behalf and Roldán's, whose Rítmica No. 5 (1930) was the first free-standing piece of Western classical music written specifically for percussion ensemble. (Note: For instrumentation details, see Percussion Ensemble Music 1910–1940. The first entr'acte in Dmitri Shostakovich's opera The Nose (1928) is scored for percussion ensemble.) During this era, Cowell also spread the ultra-modernists' experimental creed as a highly regarded teacher of composition and theory; among his many students were George Gershwin, Lou Harrison (who said he thought of Cowell as "the mentor of mentors"), and John Cage, who later proclaimed him "the open sesame for new music in America."

Encouragement of the music of Caturla and Roldán, with their proudly African-based rhythms, and of Chávez, whose work often involved instruments and themes of the Indigenous peoples of Mexico, was natural for Cowell. Growing up on the West Coast, he had been exposed to a great deal of what is now known as "world music"; along with Irish airs and dances, he encountered music from China, Japan, and Tahiti. These early experiences helped form his unusually eclectic musical outlook, exemplified by his famous statement, "I want to live in the whole world of music." He went on to investigate Indian classical music and, in the late 1920s, began teaching a course, "Music of the World's Peoples," at the New School for Social Research in New York and elsewhere — Harrison's tutelage under Cowell would begin when he enrolled in a version of the course in San Francisco. In 1931 a Guggenheim Fellowship enabled Cowell to go to Berlin to study comparative musicology (the predecessor to ethnomusicology) with Erich von Hornbostel. He studied Carnatic music and gamelan with leading instructors from India (P. Sambamoorthy), Java (Raden Mas Jodjhana), and Bali (Ramaleislan). (Note: Note that this source includes a photograph of a man with a Rhythmicon; the man is not Cowell, as the image's position in the article implies, but an associate, musical theorist Joseph Schillinger.)

=== Imprisonment ===
On May 23, 1936, Cowell was arrested in Menlo Park on a "morals" charge for allegedly having oral sex with a seventeen-year-old male. (Note: Among those who were questioned and confessed to the police, the youngest was a seventeen-year-old who, at the time, would have been legally considered an adult under the former age of majority laws of California.) After initially denying the allegation, under further questioning he admitted not only to the act but to additional sex acts with the teenager and other young men in the area, including during his time at Halcyon more than a decade earlier. He was never accused by authorities of pedophilia or molestation, but since the young men were typically referred to as "boys" at the time, incorrect assumptions were made by sensationalist newspapers and many in the public, severely damaging what public reputation he had along with the revelation of his homosexual activities. While jailed and awaiting a court hearing, he wrote a full confession accompanied by a request for leniency on the basis that "he was not exclusively homosexual but was in fact in love with a woman he hoped to marry". Suggestive letters and other artifacts were received from both Cowell and the young men who spoke to police, which were later used by the prosecution in his trial. Cowell ultimately decided to overrule his attorneys and plead guilty, for reasons unknown. Probation was denied by Judge Maxwell McNutt, and Cowell received the standard sentence of one to fifteen years. In August 1937, after a parole hearing, the Board of Pardons fixed his term of incarceration at the maximum possible sentence, a decade-and-a-half.

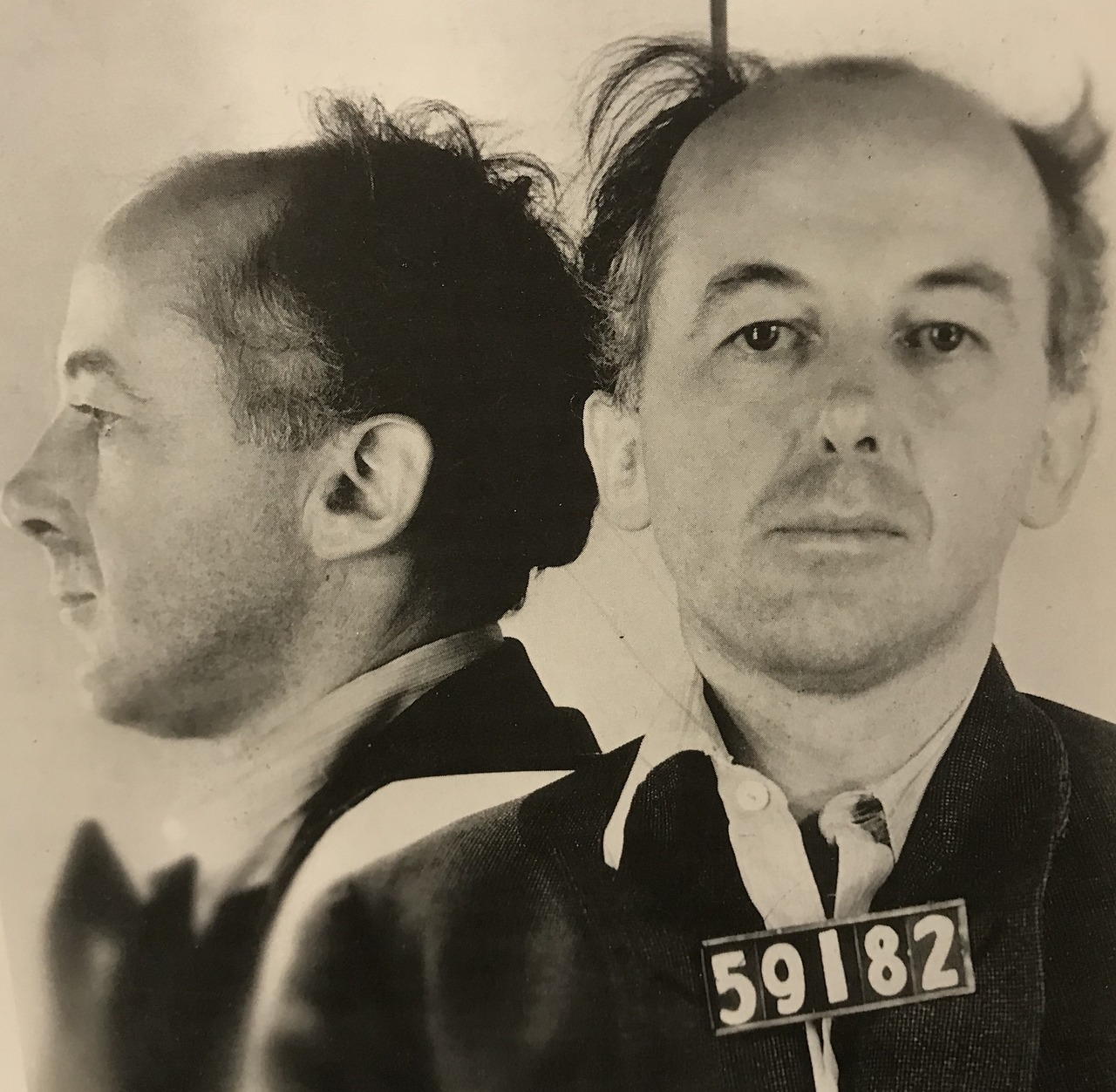
Mugshot of Cowell taken after his arrest on May 23, 1936

Cowell ultimately spent four years in San Quentin State Prison, during a tumultuous era of the prison's history. Former warden Clinton Duffy would say it "had a reputation as one of the most primitive penitentiaries in the world." Physical abuse by wardens and officials was common for so-called "bad behavior", often via whipping and starvation. During his incarceration, several leading psychologists evaluated the composer according to now-disregarded theories of homosexuality, and later expressed faith in the idea of possibly "rehabilitating" the composer. Despite this time, Cowell taught music to fellow inmates, directed the prison band, and continued to write at his customary prolific pace, producing around sixty compositions. These included two major pieces for percussion ensemble: the Oriental-toned Pulse (1939) and the memorably sepulchral Return (1939). He also continued his experiments in aleatory music: for all three movements of the Amerind Suite (1939), he wrote five versions, each more difficult than the last. Interpreters of the piece are invited to simultaneously perform two or even three versions of the same movement on multiple pianos. In the Ritournelle (Larghetto and Trio) (1939) for the dance piece Marriage at the Eiffel Tower, he explored what he called an "elastic" form. The twenty-four measures of the Larghetto and the eight of the Trio are each modular; though Cowell offers some suggestions, any hypothetically may be included or not and played once or repeatedly, allowing the piece to stretch or contract at the performers' will — the practical goal being to give a choreographer freedom to adjust the length and character of a dance piece without the usual constraints imposed by a prewritten musical composition.

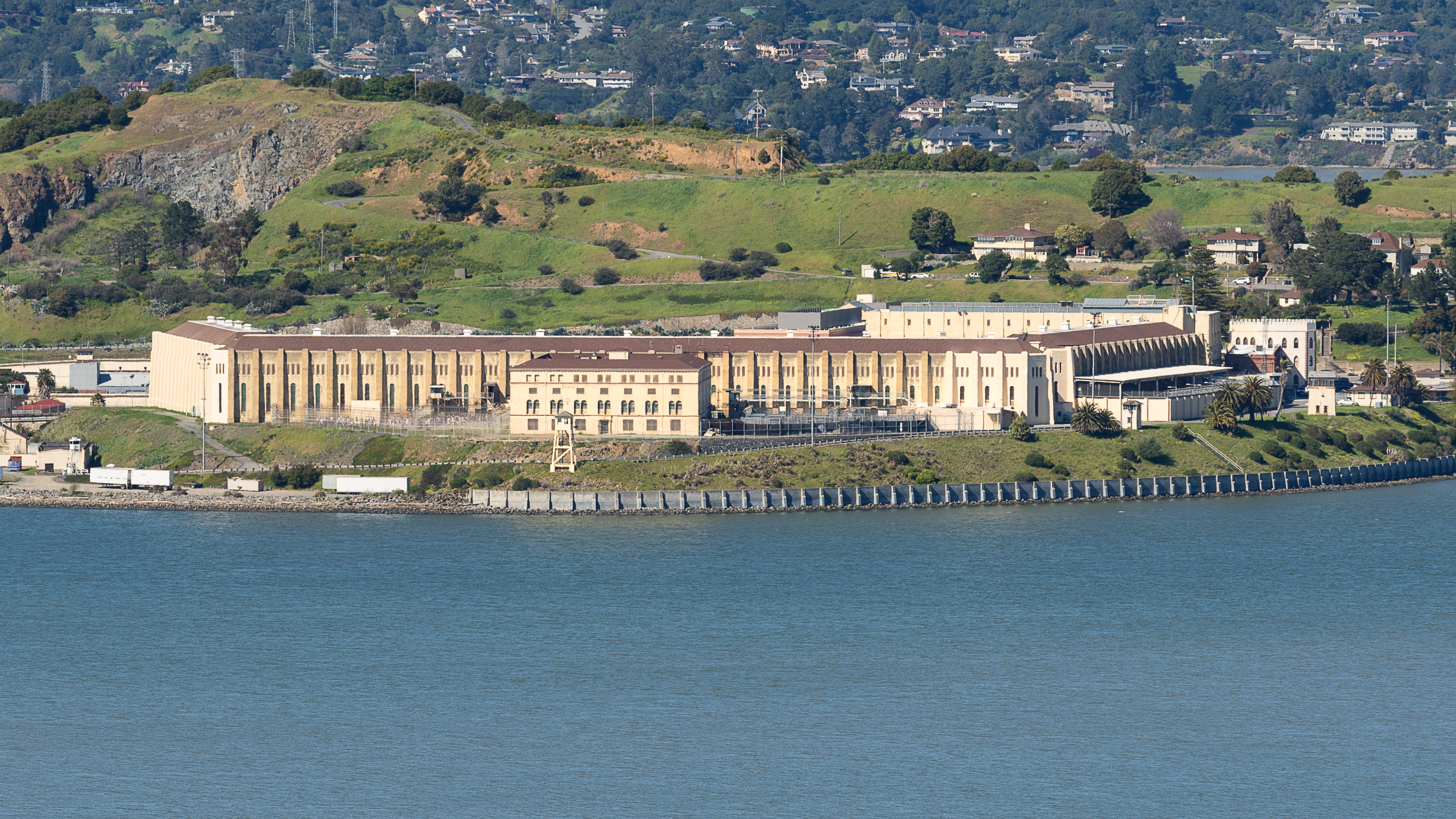
An aerial view of San Quentin State Prison, where Cowell stayed incarcerated for four years

Cowell had contributed to the Eiffel Tower project at the behest of Cage, who was not alone in lending support to his friend and former teacher. He and other gay composers such as Aaron Copland and protégé Lou Harrison easily empathized about his persecution. Harrison said in 1937, "[the] prevailing lack of balanced perception in the great mass was never so wholly apparent to me before." Cowell's cause had been taken up by composers and musicians around the country, one of the most vocal of which was his former teacher and collaborator Charles Seeger. However, a few, including Ives, temporarily broke contact with him. (Note: Sources conflict on what actually caused Ives' sudden lack of contact with Cowell. It is believed that Ives's wife, Harmony, was the one who recommended that he not to write to Cowell while in prison — so as to not have her husband's name sullied by controversy, and herself having views against homosexual behavior. The only known correspondence the two had from this era was a letter Cowell received on May 29, 1937, with Ives saying, "I've started to write you a few times or more, but didn't because I didn't know what to write or say or what to think or do – and I don't now – so I'll shut up! At least I can do all I can & I will to help New M[usic] Editions keep going as well as possible and as you would want... I do hope you can keep well & that things will go well in the future.") Cowell was eventually paroled in 1940; he subsequently moved in with Australian expatriate composer Percy Grainger and his wife in White Plains, New York. The following year Cowell married Sidney Hawkins Robertson, a prominent folk music scholar who had been instrumental in winning his freedom. Cowell was granted a pardon from California governor Culbert Olson on December 28, 1942.

== Later life ==
=== Seclusion and style shift ===
Despite the pardon — which allowed him to work at the Office of War Information, creating radio programs for broadcast overseas — his arrest, incarceration, and attendant notoriety had a devastating effect on Cowell. Conlon Nancarrow, on meeting him for the first time in 1947, reported, "The impression I got was that he was a terrified person, with a feeling that 'they're going to get him.'" He was often pestered by reporters to comment on the circumstances of his crimes and arrest, but often refused to do so. The experience took a lasting toll on his music: Cowell's compositional output became strikingly more conservative soon after his release from San Quentin, with simpler rhythms and a more traditional harmonic language.

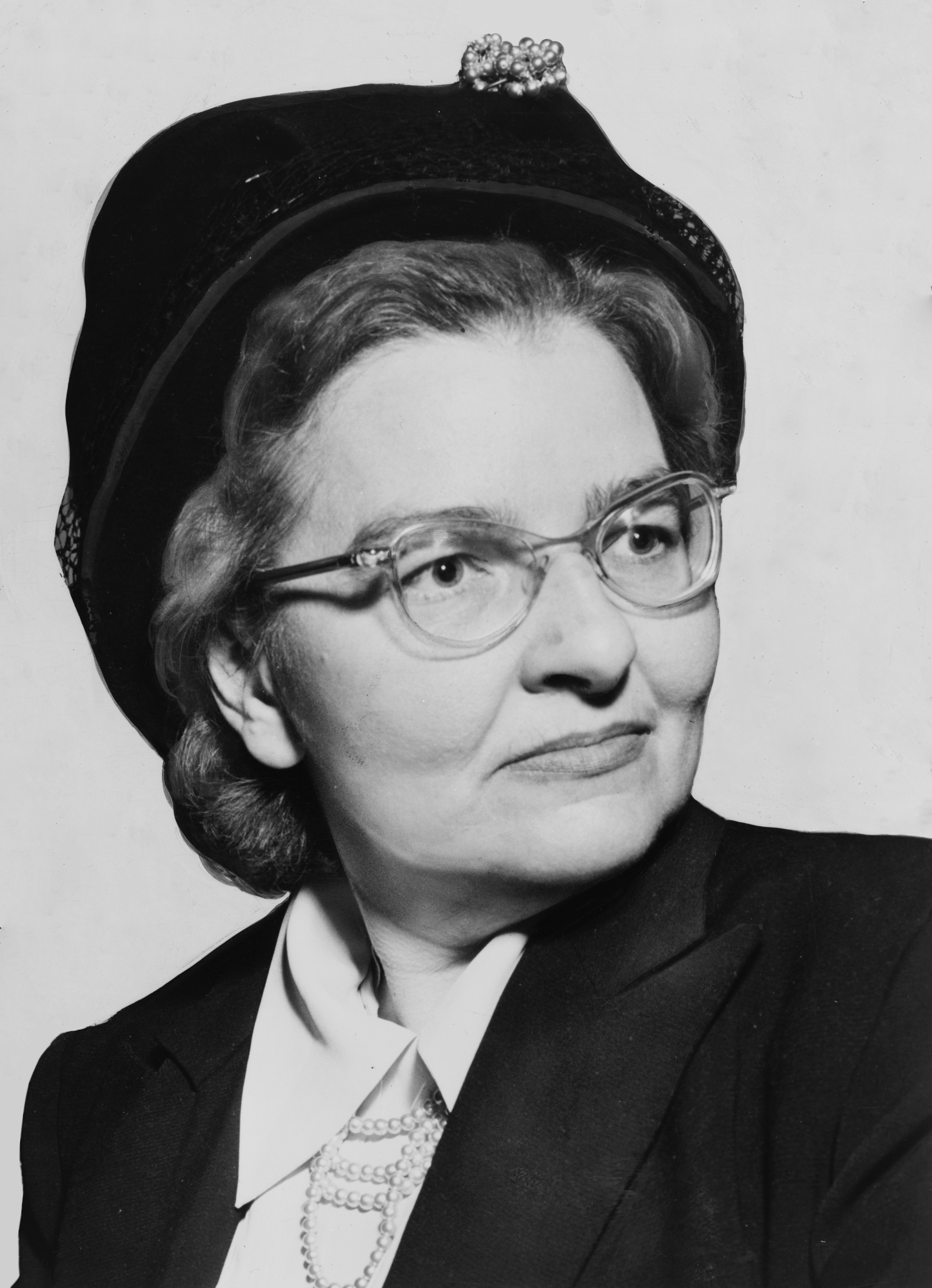
Sidney Robertson Cowell, Henry's wife, with whom he spent the last years of his life.

Many of his later works are based on American folk music, such as the series of eighteen Hymn and Fuguing Tunes (1943–64); folk music had certainly played a role in a number of Cowell's prewar compositions, but the provocative transformations that had been his signature were now largely abandoned. And, as Nancarrow observed, there were other consequences to Cowell's imprisonment: "Of course, after that, politically, he kept his mouth completely shut. He had been radical politically, too, before."

No longer an artistic radical, Cowell nonetheless retained a progressive bent and continued to be a leader (along with Harrison and McPhee) in the incorporation of non-Western musical idioms, as in the Japanese-inflected Ongaku (1957), Symphony No. 13, "Madras" (1956–58), and Homage to Iran (1959). His most compelling, poignant songs date from this era, including Music I Heard (to a poem by Conrad Aiken; 1961) and Firelight and Lamp (to a poem by Gene Baro; 1962). Cowell was elected to the American Institute of Arts and Letters in 1951. Having revived his friendship with Ives, Cowell, in collaboration with his wife, wrote the first major study of Ives's music and provided crucial support to Harrison as his former pupil championed the Ives's rediscovery. Cowell resumed teaching — Burt Bacharach, Dominick Argento, J. H. Kwabena Nketia, and Irwin Swack were among his postwar students — and served as a consultant to Folkways Records for over a decade beginning in the early 1950s, writing liner notes and editing such collections as Music of the World's Peoples (1951–61) (he also hosted a radio program of the same name) and Primitive Music of the World (1962). In 1963 he recorded searching, vivid performances of twenty of his seminal piano pieces for a Folkways album. Perhaps liberated by the passage of time and his own seniority, in his final years Cowell again produced a number of individualistic works, such as Thesis (Symphony No. 15; 1960) and 26 Simultaneous Mosaics (1963).

=== Final years and death ===
In October 1964, Cowell was diagnosed with colorectal cancer after a doctor discovered an abundance of polyps in his system during an exam. It was decided that it could not be operated on, as it went undiagnosed for too long and almost completely engulfed his large intestine. Cowell died on December 10, 1965, in his Shady, Woodstock, New York, home, following a series of strokes and succumbing to the disease.

== Compositions ==
In a career that spanned more than half a century, Cowell wrote in a very wide range of styles with his own idiosyncratic twist, including serialism, jazz, romanticism, neoclassicism, avant-garde, noise music, minimalism, etc. He is believed to have written over 940 compositions in whole, the majority for solo piano, although some have since been lost or destroyed. His wide musical catalog is typically divided into three periods – an experimental and wild early period, a more refined and technical middle period, and a neo-romantic late period.

== Legacy ==
=== Reception ===
Henry Cowell's music covers a wider range in both expression and technique than that of any other living composer. His experiments begun three decades ago in rhythm, in harmony, and in instrumental sonorities were considered then by many to be wild. Today they are the Bible of the young and still, to the conservatives, "advanced."... No other composer of our time has produced a body of works so radical and so normal, so penetrating and so comprehensive. Add to this massive production his long and influential career as a pedagogue, and Henry Cowell's achievement becomes impressive indeed. There is no other quite like it. To be both fecund and right is given to few.—Virgil Thomson, 1953 (Note: The most recent standard collection of Virgil Thomson's writings, edited by Richard Kostelanetz and published in 2002, identifies Thomson's statement as undated. The statement is excerpted at length in the liner notes to the Smithsonian Folkways CD Henry Cowell: Piano Music issued in 1993. There the quote is dated 1953, but no source is provided. Given that (a) many of the dates listed for Cowell's piano pieces in the Folkways liner notes are incorrect (see Hicks (2002), p. 80, for more on that topic) and (b) Thomson refers to "experiments begun three decades ago," a date earlier than 1953 is plausible.)

Cowell remains a somewhat obscure figure in the history of both American music and experimental music more broadly. In his time, opinions of his music and performances were incredibly mixed. Some reviewers and music critics of the time called him a "creative genius", who played "fantastically well", while others referred to his compositions as "lawless, without a trace of counterpoint," and the "peak of atonal thought" — the latter of which Cowell sarcastically used as a promotion in a following tour.

Some of the more matter-of-fact viewpoints were offered by critics such as Evelyn Wells of The San Francisco Call and Post, "Cowell's compositions are like the better order of paintings, one must stand far back, at respectful distances, before order results from chaos, and the colorful motes of sound resolve into one theme." The intent of the international press was more to emphasize his unconventional and violent performance tendencies, with headlines like those from The Daily Mail: "Piano Played with Elbow. Fingers too Limited for Mr. Cowell. Result Like a Nursery in Rebellion." and The Daily Express: "Elbow Pianist. A Wonderful Test for the Instrument."

He was considered a highly respected educator and promoter of classical music in America during the New Music period of his life. In November 2009, a two-day event celebrating Cowell's music was held in the San Francisco Bay Area near his birthplace, Menlo Park, by Other Minds.

=== Contributions to music ===
Many of the techniques Cowell either invented or pioneered are still relevant to today's music. Tone clusters in music have since been utilized by prominent classical composers such as Béla Bartók, George Crumb, Olivier Messiaen, Karlheinz Stockhausen, Iannis Xenakis, Einojuhani Rautavaara, and Krzysztof Penderecki, among others. Experimental and progressive rock keyboardists like Keith Emerson, Rick Wright, and John Cale similarly employed string piano techniques and clusters in their performances, as did free jazz pianists Dave Burrell, Cecil Taylor, Sun Ra, etc.

His 1930 book New Musical Resources is still considered a useful resource for composers, having been championed by his colleagues and subsequent students.

== Selected discography ==
=== Recordings by Cowell ===
- Henry Cowell: Piano Music (Smithsonian Folkways 40801)—performances of twenty of his compositions for solo piano, including Dynamic Motion, The Tides of Manaunaun, Aeolian Harp, The Banshee, and Tiger, and a commentary track (album pictured in article)
- Tales of Our Countryside (American Columbia 78 rpm Set X 235, recorded July 5, 1941)—the All-American Youth Orchestra conducted by Leopold Stokowski, with Cowell as piano soloist

=== Selected recordings ===
- American Piano Concertos: Henry Cowell (col legno 20064)—large-ensemble pieces, including Concerto for Piano and Orchestra and Sinfonietta, as well as The Tides of Manaunaun and other pieces for solo piano; performed by the Saarbrücken Radio Symphony Orchestra, Michael Stern—director, Stefan Litwin—piano
- The Bad Boys!: George Antheil, Henry Cowell, Leo Ornstein (hatHUT 6144)—solo piano pieces, including Anger Dance, The Tides of Manaunaun, and Tiger; performed by Steffen Schleiermacher
- Dancing with Henry (mode 101)—solo and chamber pieces, including two versions of Ritournelle (Larghetto); performed by California Parallèle Ensemble, Nicole Paiement–conductor and director, Josephine Gandolfi—piano
- Henry Cowell (First Edition 0003)—orchestral pieces, including Ongaku and Thesis (Symphony No. 15); performed by Louisville Orchestra, Robert S. Whitney and Jorge Mester—conductors
- Henry Cowell: A Continuum Portrait, Vol. 1 (Naxos 8.559192) and Vol. 2 (Naxos 8.559193)—solo, chamber, vocal, and large-ensemble pieces; performed by Continuum, Cheryl Seltzer and Joel Sachs—directors
- Henry Cowell: Mosaic (mode 72/73)—solo and chamber pieces, including Quartet Romantic, Quartet Euphometric, Mosaic Quartet (String Quartet No. 3), Return, and three versions of 26 Simultaneous Mosaics; performed by Colorado String Quartet and Musicians Accord
- Henry Cowell: Persian Set (Composers Recordings Inc. CRI-114 recorded April 1957 and reissued on Citadel CTD 88123)—Four movements for Chamber Orchestra, Leopold Stokowski—conductor
- Henry Cowell: Persian Set (Koch 3-7220-2 HI)—orchestral and large-ensemble pieces, including Hymn and Fuguing Tune No. 2; performed by Manhattan Chamber Orchestra, Richard Auldon Clark—conductor
- New Music: Piano Compositions by Henry Cowell (New Albion 103)—solo piano pieces
- Songs of Henry Cowell (Albany–Troy 240)—including How Old Is Song?, Music I Heard, and Firelight and Lamp; performed by Mary Ann Hart—mezzo-soprano, Robert Osborne—bass-baritone, Jeanne Golan—pianist
