= String piano =

Direct manipulation of piano strngs in music

Cover of Henry Cowell: Piano Music, recorded in 1963, with Cowell demonstrating the longitudinal sweeping technique

String piano is a term coined by American composer-theorist Henry Cowell (1897–1965) to collectively describe pianistic extended techniques in which sound is produced by direct manipulation of the strings, instead of or in addition to striking the piano's keys. Pioneered by Cowell in the 1920s, such techniques are now often called upon in the works of avant-garde classical music composers.

== Techniques ==
String piano compositions can involve a wide range of techniques. Among those employed by Cowell, the first major proponent of the approach, are:

- plucking (pizzicato)
- flicking back and forth across a string with a fingernail (similar to a mandolin tremolo)
- sweeping chromatically across the strings with the fingers
- sweeping across the strings with the flat of the hand (producing a tone cluster)
- sweeping along one or more strings with the flesh of the finger(s)
- scraping along one or more strings with the fingernail(s)

Strings may also be pressed at specific points along their length with the fingers of one hand while being played by the other to produce different harmonic pitches. These sounding techniques may be combined with direct muting of the strings with devices similar to those used to mute violins. In string piano pieces that call for the performer to sit at the keyboard, the keys may be depressed and held down silently with one hand to create chords, including tone clusters, that are played by the other on the strings; use of the sustain and soft pedals offer additional variations to string piano playing. For string piano pieces in which the performer stands alongside the instrument without addressing the keyboard, the pedals of the piano (and even, silently, the keys) may also be employed with the help of an assistant or a deadweight. Cowell also wrote passages for techniques involving simultaneous manipulation of the strings—sliding along one or more with the fingers or a metal object—and keyboard sounding in order to produce glissando effects. Other objects, such as bows and brushes, may also be used to elicit sound directly from the strings.

== History ==
According to Cowell biographer Michael Hicks, "The first 'serious' composer to write for piano strings was probably Percy Grainger (1882–1961): at the close of his In a Nutshell suite (1916), he directs the pianist to play on several bass strings with a yarn-covered mallet." Soon afterward, Cowell began using string piano techniques in his compositions. One of his first important works to employ the approach is the solo Piece for Piano with Strings (1923). Per the Lichtenwanger listings, Cowell's earliest piece calling for string piano techniques is The Sword of Oblivion (ca. 1920–22) for solo piano. Like A Composition (1925), for piano and string quartet, it combines traditional keyboard sounding with direct string playing. Aeolian Harp (ca. 1923) is Cowell's first composition exclusively for string piano—while keys are silently held down, as described above, all the sounding is done by direct address of the strings. Among his other works purely for string piano are The Banshee (1925) and Sinister Resonance (ca. 1930). How Old Is Song? (1930–31) is for voice and string piano (the accompaniment is adapted from Aeolian Harp).

John Cage, a student of Cowell's, was inspired by the string piano concept to pursue his explorations of the prepared piano.

In Music of the Spheres, composed in 1916–18, the Danish composer Rued Langgaard directs the pianist to play glissandi directly on the piano strings. He calls it "Glissando-piano" in the score. In Langgaard's Insektarium for solo piano from 1917, the pianist is also instructed to play directly on the strings in two of the movements.

Although few composers other than Cowell have used the term "string piano" to describe their use of the piano strings (George Crumb, for instance, refers to the "resources of the 'extended piano'"), such techniques were increasingly called upon during the second half of the 20th century, eventually becoming part of the general vocabulary of contemporary pianistic writing and performance. Many composers have used such "inside-the-piano" techniques sporadically, as special effects; a few have made more substantial use of them, such as Crumb (e.g., Makrokosmos, vols. 1 and 2 [1972; 1973]), Halim El-Dabh, Sofia Gubaidulina (e.g., Dancer on a Tightrope [1993]), Mauricio Kagel (e.g., Trio in drei Sätzen [1984–85]), Carl Orff (e.g., Antigonæ [1949]), Karlheinz Stockhausen (e.g., Klavierstücke XII–XIV [1979–84]), Toru Takemitsu (e.g., Corona for Pianists [1962]), and David Tudor. In 1977 composer Stephen Scott founded the Bowed Piano Ensemble at Colorado College, an ensemble of ten musicians playing in and around a grand piano.

== Some recordings ==
- Daughters of the Lonesome Isle: John Cage (New Albion 070)—includes In the Name of the Holocaust (1942) for string piano and Music for Piano No. 2 (1953), arranged for bowed piano, performed by Margaret Leng Tan
- George Crumb: Makrokosmos, Vols. 1 and 2 (Music and Arts 1044)—includes a number of pieces featuring string piano techniques, performed by Jo Boatright
- Henry Cowell: A Continuum Portrait, Vol. 1 (Naxos 8.559192)—includes Irish Suite, for string piano and small orchestra, performed by Continuum, Joel Sachs–conductor, Cheryl Seltzer–piano
- Henry Cowell: A Continuum Portrait, Vol. 2 (Naxos 8.559193)—includes Piece for Piano with Strings and The Banshee, performed by Cheryl Seltzer
- Henry Cowell: Piano Music (Smithsonian Folkways 40801)—includes The Banshee and (linked on one track) Aeolian Harp and Sinister Resonance, performed by Henry Cowell (album pictured in article)
- New Music: Piano Compositions by Henry Cowell (New Albion 103)—includes The Banshee, performed by Chris Brown, and Aeolian Harp, performed by Sorrel Hays
- Songs of Henry Cowell (Albany–Troy 240)—includes How Old Is Song?, performed by Mary Ann Hart–mezzo-soprano, Jeanne Golan–pianist
- Vikings of the Sunrise (New Albion 084)—Fantasy on the Polynesian star path navigators, performed by the Bowed Piano Ensemble

== See also ==
- Piano extended technique
