= Iron Composer =

International music competition

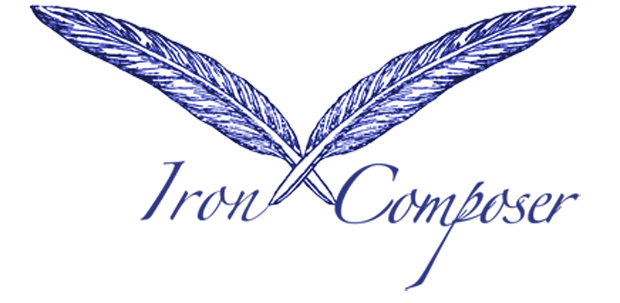
The logo for Iron Composer (designed by Joe Drew).

Iron Composer is a music competition operated where five composers are given just five hours to write a piece of music. The competition is operated by Analog Arts, and it was first organized as part of the ARTSaha! festival. Iron Composer is currently held at the Baldwin-Wallace Conservatory of Music in Berea, Ohio. The competition is open to composers of all ages.

== History ==
The idea for Iron Composer originated in the composition seminars of Lucky Mosko at CalArts. Mosko would present his students with something like a bag of carrots and give them an hour to write a piece of music using the carrots. While organizing the ARTSaha! 2007 festival for Analog Arts, curator Joe Drew presented the idea of an Iron Composer competition to Ken Bales who had recently been appointed to an endowed professorship at the University of Nebraska at Omaha. Bales agreed to fund the first competition, which was open only to Nebraska residents between the ages of 18 and 26. The following year, the competition was opened to a national field. In 2009, Iron Composer moved to Baldwin-Wallace, where it has remained. The age restrictions were dropped in 2010, and Iron Composer is currently open to composers of any age from around the world.

== Structure ==
An annual invitational event is organized after an open call for entries. Five finalists are selected on the basis of their submitted scores and biographies. On the day of the competition, the finalists are assigned an instrumentation and a secret musical ingredient at the beginning of the day. They have five hours to write in a private room with a piano. The finalists assemble their scores and parts for the rehearsal. Each composer is given about a half-hour with the ensemble to rehearse. The performance order is chosen by a random drawing.

The five pieces are performed on a public concert that same evening. Since 2009, WCLV 104.9 FM has broadcast the Iron Composer concert live. Three judges comment on each piece and assign them a score. The judging panel always includes a composer, one of the performers on the concert, and the third judge is usually a non-musician. Until 2012, the top three finalists are awarded cash prizes ranging from $100 to $500. Currently, all five composers receive prizes beginning at $200. In 2013, the top prize included a performance of a new or existing work with the Blue Water Chamber Orchestra. In 2014, the top prize was expanded to include a $500 commission from Blue Water.

== Scoring ==
Iron Composer is scored on a 50-point scale, allowing for a possible total of 150 points for each finalist. Points are awarded on four different criteria:

- Use of the Secret Ingredient (15 points)
- Originality (15 points)
- Technical Command (10 points)
- Overall Presentation (10 points)

In the event of a tie, the composer who earned more points for Use of the Secret Ingredient and Originality will be ranked higher.

== Contests ==
Year	Results	Instrumentation	Secret Ingredient
2015	1. Tawnie Olson; 2. Dorothy Hindman; 3. Rica Narimoto; 4. Ryan Keebaugh; 5. Kirsten Broberg	Recorder (sopranino, alto, or bass), celeste, and sound icon	Board Games: (composers selected) Concept, Go, Lost Treasure, Mystery Mansion, Subbuteo
2014	1. Jason Thorpe Buchanan; 2. Michelle McQuade Dewhirst; 3. Gene Pritsker; 4. Charles Norman Mason; 5. Polina Nazaykinskaya	Low String Trio: viola, cello, double bass	Sound Map of Downtown Cleveland: recordings from locations within a 1-mile radius of the venue
2013	1. Jakub Polaczyk; 2. Can Billir; 3. David Wolfson; 4. Jennifer Jolley; 5. Christoffer Schunk	Brass Trio double-bell trumpet trombone French horn	Audience Participation clapping; foot tapping; humming; snapping; whistling
2012	1. David Carter; 2. Caroline Mallonée; 3. Julie Hill; 4. Mark Popeney; 5. Anne Goldberg	Prepared piano Tuba Clarinet	8 seconds of silence
2011	1. Zvonimir Nagy; 2. Melody Eötvös; 3. David Kirkland Garner; Matthew Heap Mari Takano	Organ (1914 Austin)	Regina Music Box
2010	1. Natalie Williams; 2. Marcus Maroney; 3. Anthony Green; Yotam Haber Marie Incontrera	Flute & cello	A broad assortment of sticks and stones
2009	1. Sunny Knable; 2. Travis Jeffords; 3. Andrew Jamieson; Devin Farney John Rot	2 pianos 2 trumpets 1 percussionist (5 toms/1 bass drum)	Little Red Riding Hood (Brothers Grimm version)
2008	1. Hermes Camacho; 2. Elizabeth Lim; 3. Greg Simon; George Lam Joe Trapanese	Piano trio	Monet's Impression, Sunrise
2007	1. Luke Furman; 2. Mark Diischer; 3. David von Kampen; Colin Breen Timothy Vallier	Wind quintet	The Jetsons motif by Hoyt Curtin

1 = First prize; 2 = Second prize; 3 = Third prize; 4 = Fourth prize; 5 = Fifth prize
