= The American Prize =

Music award

The American Prize is a set of annual nonprofit national competitions in the performing arts which recognizes and rewards commercial and noncommercial recorded performances of classical music in the United States based on submitted applications. There is no live competition. The award is bestowed at professional, college/university, community, and high school levels in a number of areas including composition, piano, voice, chamber music, conducting, and ensemble performance. The jury consists of well-known performing artists in each area, with the conductor and composer David Katz serving as chief judge.

Artists and ensembles self-nominate through an application process or are nominated by a teacher, parent, board member or colleague. Evaluation is a key component of the competition; applicants who reach finalist status or higher receive a written evaluation from a member of the judging panel. Judges include composer Judith Lang Zaimont, and Metropolitan Opera soprano Sharon Sweet. Winners of each category receive a cash award.

== Composition winners ==
=== Professional Division ===
	Orchestra	Choral	Chamber music	Band/wind ensemble	Opera / theater / film / dance
2011	Jesse Ayers	Ted Vives	not awarded	not awarded	not awarded
2012	Michael Gatonska	Brian Holmes	not awarded	not awarded	not awarded
2013	Alessandra Salvati	Jonathan Santore	Michael Deak	Aleksander Sternfeld-Dunn	not awarded
2014	Gregg Wramage	Dominick DiOrio	Piotr Szewczyk	Laurence Bitensky	Todd Goodman
2015	Angelique Poteat	Travis Alford	tie: David Garner / Judith Lang Zaimont	David Avshalomov	Yiguo Yan
2016	Jennifer Bellor	Lansing McLoskey	Justin Dello Joio	Miguel Roig-Francolí	Justin Dello Joio
2017	Brian Ciach	(pending)	instrumental: Ching-chu Hu / choral (pending)	Robert Denham	Jocelyn Hagen
2019		Nilo Alcala			Eric W. Sawyer
2020	Tyler Goodrich White	major works: John Muehleisen / shorter works: Donald Skirvin	instrumental: Jakub Polaczyk / vocal: William Vollinger	Shawn Okpebholo	Zach Redler
2021	Ruihan Yang	Michael Bussewitz-Quarm	Nickitas Demos	Kyle Kindred	Dave Ragland

=== College/University Division ===
	Orchestra	Choral	Chamber Music	Band/Wind Ensemble	Opera / Theater / Film / Dance
2013	Roberto Kalb	Joshua Fishbein	not awarded	not awarded	not awarded
2014	Texu Kim	Saunder Choi	Rodrigo Bussad	not awarded	not awarded
2015	Patrick O’Malley	Kyle Randall	Derek David	not awarded	not awarded
2016	Jihyun Kim	Matthew Recio	Lara Poe	Derek Jenkins	Georgi Dimitrov (student division)
2017	Antonio Juan Marcos	(pending)	instrumental: Olga Amelkina-Vera / choral (pending)	Tyler Bouque	Michele Cheng
2021	Patrick Holcomb	not awarded	Liam Diethrich	Andrew Faulkenberry	Nathaniel Trost
2023	(pending)	Frank Duarte	(pending)	(pending)	(pending)

== Piano winners ==
=== Professional Division ===
	Solo	Concerto
2011	Lin-Yu Wang	Sarah S. Chan
2012	Nathanael May	not awarded
2013	Petronel Malan	Anthony Michael Cornet
2014	Nassib Nassar	Kasandra Keeling
2015	Michael Angelucci	Bill John Newbrough
2016	Jeremy Samolesky	Thomas Yee
2017-18	Roberto Plano	Richard Bosworth
2018-19	Svetlana Belsky	Tzu-Yin Huang
2019-20	Lei Weng	Anna Dmytrenko
2021	Liana Paniyeva	Susan Merdinger
2022	Yifei Xu	Cristian Makhuli
2023	Sophia Agranovich	Sergei Kvitko
2024	Anjun Zheng	Emiko Edwards

=== College/University Division ===
	Solo	Concerto
2011	Sora Park	George Hemcher
2012	Azariah Tan	Azariah Tan
2013	not awarded	not awarded
2014	Hyunki Yoon	not awarded
2015	Anna Dmytrenko	not awarded
2016	Eunsun So	Nathan Cheung
2017-18	Nicholas Susi	Xiao Chen
2018-19	John Wilson	Aoshuang Li
2019-20	Chenyu Wang	Bogyeong Lee
2021	Jen-Hao Yeh	Yang Li
2022	Kiwa Mizutani	not awarded
2023	Junwen Liang	not awarded
2024	not awarded	not awarded

== Voice winners ==
=== Professional Division ===
	Opera / operetta (women)	Opera / operetta (men)	Art song / oratorio (women)	Art song / oratorio (men)
2011	Laura Strickling	Jonathan Beyer	Christine Steyer	Blake Friedman
2012	Suzanne Vinnik	Christian Ketter	Sharin Apostolou	Matthew Garrett
2013	Suzanne Vinnik	Christian Ketter	Emily Marvosh	Darren Chase
2014	Megan Marino	Mitchell Hutchings	Sarah Davis	Leo Rado
2015	Aundi Marie Moore	Peter Lightfoot	Tania Coambs	Jorell Williams
2016	Samantha Britt	Keith Brown	Margaret Lias	Stephen Lancaster
2017-18	Meredith Mecum	Ryan Francis Burns	Kristina Bachrach	Justin John Moniz
2018-19	Jacqueline Piccolino	Logan Tanner	Emily Yocum Black	Justin John Moniz
2019-20	Madison Marie McIntosh	Leo Radosavljevic	Ann Cravero	Bryan Pinkall
2021	Jacquelyn Matava	Wayd Odle	Loralee Songer	Ryan Townsend Strand

=== College/University Division ===
	Opera / operetta (women)	Opera / operetta (men)	Art song / oratorio (women)	Art song / oratorio (men)
2015	Sarah Bauer	Galeano Salas	Paulina Nastasha Yeung	not awarded
2016	Natalie Logan	Quinn Bernegger	Samantha Schmid	Quinn Bernegger
2017	tie: Sarah Cooper / Kellie Motter	Ben M. Reisinger	Lauren Elizabeth Walker	David John Davani
2021	Kim Kenny	not awarded	Solene Le Van	Morgan Manifacier

== Orchestral winners ==
=== Professional Division ===
	Orchestral performance	Conducting
2010	Lancaster Festival Orchestra	Gary Sheldon, Lancaster Festival Orchestra
2011	Pensacola Symphony Orchestra	Christopher Zimmerman, Fairfax Symphony Orchestra
2012	National Philharmonic	Dirk Meyer, Duluth Superior Symphony Orchestra
2013	not awarded	not awarded
2014	Park Avenue Chamber Symphony	not awarded
2015	Western Piedmont Symphony	Olivier Ochanine, Philippine Philharmonic Orchestra
2016		
2018	Allentown Symphony Orchestra	
2019	Symphony Number One	David Bernard
2019-20	Cape Cod Chamber Orchestra	Markand Thakar

=== College/University Division ===
	Orchestral performance	Conducting
2010	Texas Chamber Group Orchestra	Ricardo Averbach, Oxford Chamber Orchestra
2011	University of Michigan Symphony Orchestra	Kenneth Kiesler, University of Michigan Symphony Orchestra
2012	University of North Carolina Symphony Orchestra	Gemma New, New Jersey Symphony Orchestra
2013	not awarded	not awarded
2014	St. Olaf Orchestra	not awarded
2015	Baylor Symphony Orchestra	Boon Hua Lien, Eastman Philharmonia

== Choral winners ==
=== Professional Division ===
	Choral performance
2010	Roomful of Teeth
2011	Washington Bach Consort
2012	not awarded
2013	not awarded
2014	not awarded
2015	Houston Chamber Choir
2019-20	co-winners: Dallas Chamber Choir / mirabai

=== College/University Division ===
	Choral performance
2010	Washington & Jefferson College Camerata Singers
2011	Mansfield University Concert Choir
2012	East Carolina University Chamber Singers
2013	Iowa State Singers
2014	The University of North Dakota Concert Choir
2015	USC Thornton Chamber Singers
