= Jocelyn Hagen =

American composer

Jocelyn Hagen MA
- Born: 1980; Minneapolis
- Education: St. Olaf College; Arizona State University; University of Minnesota
- Occupation: Composer
- Years active: 2004-present
- Publishers: Graphite Publishing; G. Schirmer; Boosey and Hawkes; Santa Barbara Music Publishing

Jocelyn Hagen /heɪgən/ (born 1980) is an American composer based in Minnesota. She composes primarily for voice: solo, chamber and choral, but also has composed for chamber, wind, and orchestral ensembles. She has explored large-scale multimedia works, electro-acoustic music, dance, and opera.

Hagen is the co-founder and co-owner of Graphite Publishing, an online vocal music publisher of digital scores. Hagen's music is independently published through JH Music, as well as through Graphite Publishing, G. Schirmer, Boosey and Hawkes, Santa Barbara Music Publishing, and Fred Bock Music Publishing.

== Biography ==
Hagen was born in 1980 in Minneapolis, Minnesota, but was raised in Valley City, North Dakota. She began piano lessons with her mother, Sara, who then joined the music faculty at Valley City State University. Hagen learned piano quickly, and by the time she was in the second grade, she was able to accompany choir performances at Washington Elementary. She began experimenting with composition during her piano studies. She also learned the trumpet and horn and performed with school bands, as well as participating in musical theater and singing with choirs. When Hagen was a high school senior, her choir director, Cindy Peterson, nurtured her compositional talent. Hagen composed a piece for the women's choir, Evening Star, with text by Edgar Allan Poe.

After graduating from high school, Hagen began studies at St. Olaf College. During her freshman year, she sang with Manitou Singers, the first-year women's chorus at St. Olaf. During the first semester of her sophomore year, Hagen transferred to Arizona State University. However, she soon returned to St. Olaf College and sang with the St. Olaf Chapel Choir, conducted by Robert Scholz. She studied composition with Timothy Mahr and Peter Hamlin. Hagen graduated Magna Cum Laude from St. Olaf in 2003 with a Bachelor of Music in Theory and Composition, as well as a Bachelor of Music in Vocal Music Education.

Hagen then earned a Master of Arts in Composition from the University of Minnesota, where she studied with Doug Geers and Judith Lang Zaimont, and graduated summa cum laude in 2006. After participating in a consortium commission for one of Hagen's pieces, St. Catherine University offered Hagen a position as adjunct professor. Hagen taught orchestration in this role in 2007 and 2009.

Hagen served as composer-in-residence for The Singers from 2004 to 2014. From 2004 to 2005, Hagen was the composer-in-residence for the American Composer's Forum "Composer-in-the-schools" program at St. Paul Central High School in St. Paul, Minnesota. She was composer-in-residence at Valley City State University from 2006 to 2007, at Shorter College from 2008 to 2009, at St. Catherine University from 2010 to 2011. She is currently composer-in-residence at North Dakota State University.

== Work ==
=== Commissions and awards ===
Hagen has been awarded McKnight Artist Fellowships in 2010 and a grant from the Minnesota State Arts Board to complete a piece for the Metropolitan Symphony Orchestra in Minneapolis. She received the Live Music for Dance grant from the American Composer's Forum in 2011 and 2014 to create new works with choreographer Penelope Freeh. She received the Sorel Foundation's recording grant in 2011 to record amass.

Hagen has also received other grants from the American Composer's Forum. She received The American Prize, third place, in Composition, Choral Division in 2015 for "Sanctus," from amass. She also received The American Prize, first place, for Opera/Musical Theatre in 2017, and the Sage Award for Best Overall Design in 2015 for Test Pilot.

=== amass ===
During her time as composer-in-residence for The Singers, Hagen initially planned to write a traditional setting of the Catholic Mass. However, while considering the "Credo" text, she struggled with the idea of the "Credo" as the only path to salvation. She instead included spiritual poems from various faith traditions, ultimately creating a unique piece that connects the oratorio and mass traditions. In doing so, she presents a "pluralistic view of religion as well as a message of unity and peace" for all audiences.

This 65-minute work features soprano, tenor, and bass soloists, four-part choir, solo cello, cello quartet, guitar, and three percussionists. Hagen explored the use of homemade percussion instruments, including handmade oxygen tank bells. amass uses a diversity of timbres from the varied use of solo and ensemble textures, and traditional and experimental tone colors. In combining both sacred and secular texts, amass continues the tradition of the Catholic Mass, as well as inviting the audience to consider multiple paths to salvation. "Frequent rhapsodic repetitions of texts throughout the oratorio allow listeners to meditate and reflect on the work's music and its spiritual narrative without the encumbrance of new texts to consider."

=== The Notebooks of Leonardo da Vinci ===
Hagen was commissioned by the Minnesota Chorale and the Metropolitan Symphony Orchestra to compose The Notebooks of Leonardo da Vinci, a seven-movement work for choir, orchestra, and video projections to honor Leonardo da Vinci'. Since its premiere in March 2019, the piece has been performed in Michigan, Connecticut, California, Alabama and Montana.

Traditionally, film music is written as secondary to the visuals, but Hagen's aim in this piece was to create an opportunity for music to serve as the foundation for the digital media. The piece includes a video technician using Muséik software to adjust the film in real time to follow the conductor, and is thus a performer like any other member of the ensemble. "What Hagen accomplishes through her seven movements is to voice the pent-up side of human nature, that 'unquenchable curiosity' and search for worlds waiting to be born, which characterizes Leonardo's investigations and the rebirth of knowledge on a human scale."

Hagen gave a TED presentation in Minneapolis about the work in February 2019, presenting on how the piece is "exploring the new frontier of video syncing technology with a new work for choir, orchestra, and a new member of the orchestra—video projections."

=== The Song Poet ===
Hagen was commissioned by the Minnesota Opera as part of its Project Opera program, to compose an opera based on The Song Poet by writer Kao Kalia Yang. It tells the story of Yang's father, who fled Laos as a refugee following the Vietnam War, first to a Thai refugee camp, and eventually to St. Paul, Minnesota. Yang wrote the libretto for the opera, which featured texts sung in both Hmong and English. In addition to Hmong language, the opera also features Hmong traditional musical practices, such as kwv txhiaj, a traditional form of sung Hmong poetry, the first of opera of its kind to do so. The Song Poet premiered in March 2023, conducted by Tiffany Chang with dance choreography by Penelope Freeh.

=== Reviews ===
Hagen's song cycle Kiss was reviewed in The Journal of Singing in January 2017 by Eileen Strempel. Strempel describes: "The work is permeated with motivic development that both evoke the tension, excitement and frisson of the kiss, along with the whirling motives that hint at dreams (both imagined and lived). These powerful, evocative and descriptive songs are a joy to sing and study." Strempel also discusses the unique commissioning framework that Hagen used to support the creation of the piece. Hagen "approached singers interested in commissioning songs by her," and the project was supported by a collective of professional sopranos, each of which had "the right to a regional premiere of the cycle."

The "Benedictus" movement from amass was reviewed in The Choral Journal by John C. Hughes. Hughes wrote: "The overall characteristic of Benedictus is atmospheric. Similar to the music of the Taizé community, the piece's repetition fosters meditation. The ebb and flow of the sound-scape lulls the listener into deep reflection...Hagen's music exemplifies depth as it is not only beautiful, but also inspires introspection."

== Discography ==
- "Vespertilians (Bats)" — Vespertilians (Bats), London Oriana Choir. London Oriana Choir Records, LOC 1902 (2019)
- "Moon Goddess" — Ecstatic Songs, Mirabai Women's Choir. Blue Griffin Recording, BG 467 (2018)
- "O come, O come Emmanuel" — To Bethlehem: Carols & Motets for Christmas, Kantorei of Kansas City. Resonus Classics, RES 10175 (2016)
- "Someplace" — Let Me Fly: A Celebration of American Choral Music, University of South Dakota Chamber Singers. Navona Records, NV 6060 (2016)
- "Songs of Fields and Prairies" — Letters from the Garden – songs by Jocelyn Hagen; Gwyneth Walker; Madeleine Dring; Abbie Betinis, Leanne Freeman-Miller, soprano; Michelle Havlik-Jergens, piano. Centaur Records, CEN 3317 (2014)
