= Lost Treasure =

Lost Treasure may refer to:

- Lost treasure, a list of missing treasures
- Lost Treasure (board game), 1982
- The Lost Treasure, a 1996 Croatian film
- Lost Treasure (film), a 2003 American film
- Lost Treasure (magazine), an American monthly about missing treasures
