= Alain Louvier =

French composer (born 1945)

Alain Louvier (born 13 September 1945) is a French composer of contemporary classical music.

== Biography ==
Born in Paris, Louvier studied from 1953 to 1967 at the Boulogne-Billancourt Conservatory headed by Marcel Landowski, then from 1967 to 1970 at the Conservatoire de Paris with Henriette Puig-Roget, Olivier Messiaen, Tony Aubin, Robert Veyron-Lacroix, Norbert Dufourcq and Manuel Rosenthal. As a student in 1968, he won the 161st and last annual Prix de Rome for musical composition.

Louvier headed the École Nationale de Musique of Boulogne-Billancourt from 1972 to 1986. From 1986 to 1991, he was the director of the Conservatoire de Paris. From 1991 to 2009, he taught music analysis and orchestration at the CNSMDP (Conservatoire) in Paris. From 2009 until 2013, he was again director of the Boulogne-Billancourt Conservatory (the École Nationale de Musique de Boulogne-Billancourt).

Louvier has composed pieces for piano, harpsichord, chamber music and orchestra. He is particularly known for his invention of a new piano technique (also used on organ and harpsichord) centered around the "aggressors": the 10 fingers, 2 palms, 2 fists and 2 forearms, treated individually. He forged a precise gestural vocabulary, and an adapted graphic syntax, involving these different elements.

== Works ==
- Études pour agresseurs I (1964), II (1967) for piano
- Études pour agresseurs III (1969) for modern harpsichord
- Études pour agresseurs IV (1967–1972) for two pianos
- Études pour agresseurs V (1972) for harpsichord, loudspeaker and strings
- Quintette de cuivres (Brass Quintet)
- Sonata (1966) for two pianos
- Chant des limbes (1969) for orchestra
- Quatre Préludes pour cordes (1970) for one or several pianos
- Chimère (1973) for harp, premiered in 1975
- Sempre più alto (1981) for viola and piano
- Concerto pour orchestres (1982) for orchestra and computer synthesized soundtrack
- Envols d'écailles (1986) for flute, viola and harp
- Concerto (1996) for viola and orchestra
- Solstices, 5 short pieces for high voices and piano, composed in 2004 and premiered on May 20, 2008
