= Horațiu Rădulescu =

Romanian-French composer

Horațiu Rădulescu (Romanian pronunciation: [hoˈrat͡sju rəduˈlesku]; 7 January 1942 – 25 September 2008) was a Romanian-French composer, best known for the spectral technique of composition.

== Life ==
Rădulescu was born in Bucharest, where he studied the violin privately with Nina Alexandrescu, a pupil of George Enescu and Jacques Thibaud, and later studied composition at the Bucharest Academy of Music (MA 1969), where his teachers included Stefan Niculescu, Tiberiu Olah and Aurel Stroe, some of the leading figures of the emerging avant-garde. Upon graduation in 1969 Rădulescu left Romania for the west, and settled in Paris, becoming a French citizen in 1974. He returned to Romania thereafter several times for visits, beginning in 1991 when he directed a performance of his Iubiri, the first public performance of any of his mature works in his native country. (Rădulescu nonetheless commented that in the interim he had dedicated many of his works to a "virtual and sublimated" Romania).

One of the first works to be completed in Paris (though the concept had come to him in Romania) was Credo for nine cellos, the first work to employ his spectral techniques. This technique "comprises variable distribution of the spectral energy, synthesis of the global sound sources, micro- and macro-form as sound-process, four simultaneous layers of perception and of speed, and spectral scordaturae, i.e. rows of unequal intervals corresponding to harmonic scales". These techniques were developed considerably in his music of subsequent decades. In the early 1970s he attended classes given by Cage, Ligeti, Stockhausen, and Xenakis at the Darmstadt Summer Courses, and by Ferrari and Kagel in Cologne. He presented his own music in Messiaen's classes at the Paris Conservatoire in 1972–73; Rădulescu recalled that while Messiaen himself was sympathetic, later calling him "one of the most original young musicians of our time", some of the students were more reticent, not understanding his music's "colourful, dreamy, mystical" inclinations.

Beginning in the early 1970s Rădulescu's works began to be performed at the leading contemporary music festivals, including Gaudeamus (Taaroa, 1971; in ko 'tro – mioritic space, 1972), Darmstadt (Flood for the Eternal's Origins, 1972), Royan (fountains of my sky, 1973; Lamento di Gesù, 1975), Metz (Wild Incantesimo for nine orchestras, 1978; Byzantine Prayer, 1988) and Donaueschingen. From 1979 to 1981 he studied computer-assisted composition and psycho-acoustics at IRCAM, although his work makes relatively little use of electronic means of sound production.

In 1983 he founded the ensemble European Lucero in Paris to perform his own works, a variable ensemble consisting of soloists specialising in the techniques required for his music. In 1991 he founded the Lucero Festival.

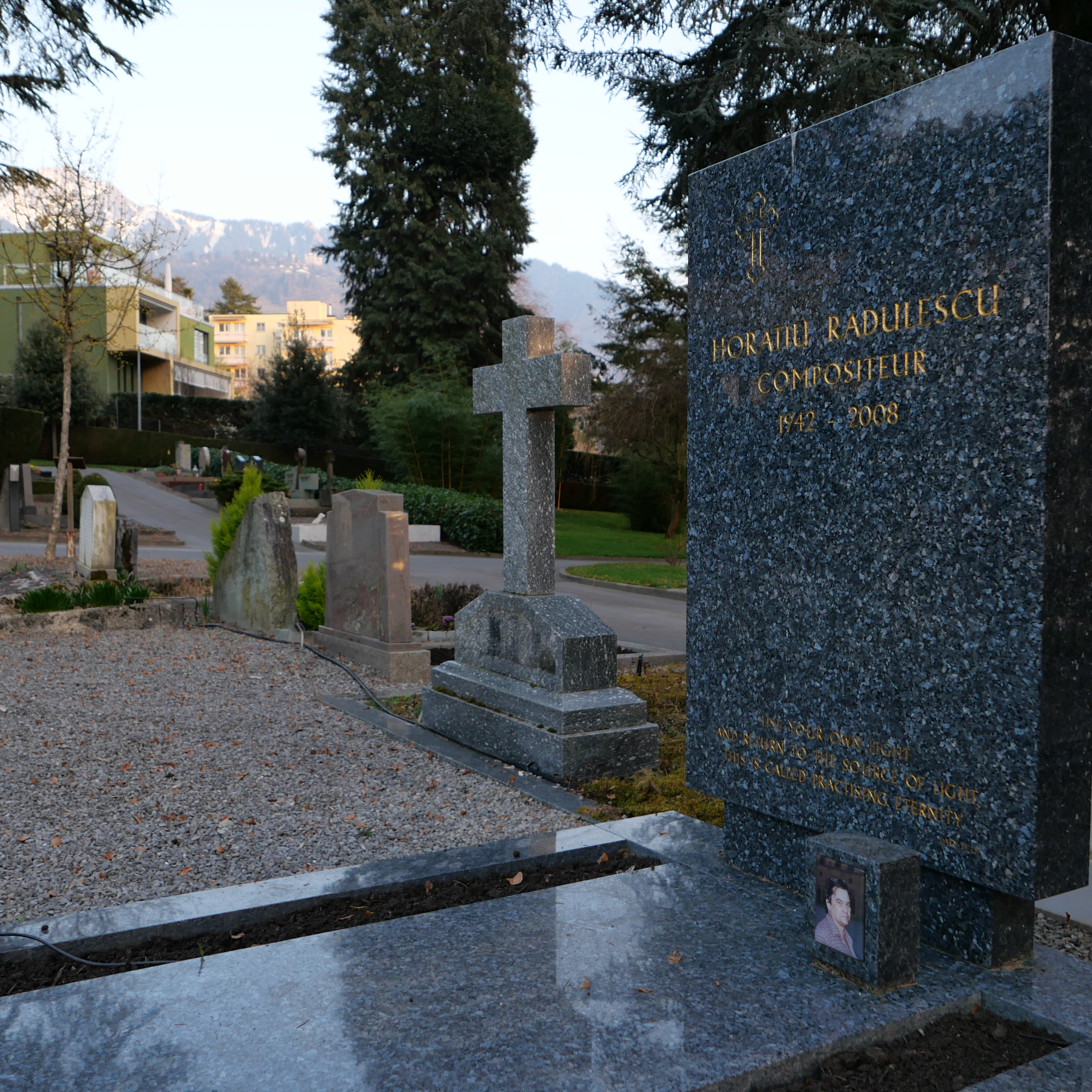
Radulescu's grave in 2024.

In the mid-1980s Rădulescu was based in Freiburg, Germany, though for many years he retained an address in Versailles. In 1988 he lived in Berlin on a DAAD fellowship, and in 1989–90 he was a resident in San Francisco and Venice as a laureate of the Villa Médici hors les murs scholarship. In the mid-1990s he moved to Switzerland, living first in Clarens and later in Vevey. He died from cancer in Paris on 25 September 2008 and found his final resting place at the cemetery of Clarens.

== Musical style and technique ==
From the very beginning, Rădulescu's musical concepts, and the techniques he invented to realise them, were unconventional. For his final exams in Bucharest he composed the orchestral work Taaroa, named after the Polynesian god; this displeased his teachers, who found the idea "mystical" and "imperialistic"; the only member of the faculty who supported him was the composer Anatol Vieru.

Rădulescu's spectral techniques, as they evolved through the 1970s and beyond, are quite distinct from those of his French contemporaries Gérard Grisey and Tristan Murail. His compositional aim, as outlined in his book Sound Plasma was to bypass the historical categories of monophony, polyphony and heterophony and to create musical textures with all elements in a constant flux. Central to this was an exploration of the harmonic spectrum, and by the invention of new playing techniques the aim to bringing out, and sometimes to isolate, the upper partials of complex sounds, on which new spectra could be built.

The harmonic relationships in his music are based on these spectra and on the phenomena of sum and difference tones. The opening sonority of his fourth string quartet (1976–87), for example, is based on partials 21, 22 and 43 of a low C fundamental; this is an example of what Rădulescu referred to as "self-generating functions" in his music, as partials 21 and 22 give in sum 43 and in difference 1, the fundamental. (On a C fundamental, partials 21, 22 and 43 are all different, microtonally distinct kinds of F, the 21st partial being 29 cents lower than tempered F, partial 22 being 51 cents higher and partial 43 12 cents higher.) Much of his music for strings makes use of a "spectral scordatura", where the open strings are retuned, often to simulations of the partials of a single harmonic spectrum. For example, in Lux Animae (1996/2000) for solo cello or viola, the open strings are retuned to the 3rd, 4th, 7th and 11th partials of a low E.

Many of Rădulescu's later works derive their poetic inspiration from the Tao Te Ching of Lao-tzu, especially in the 1988 English version by Stephen Mitchell: the titles of his second, third, fourth, fifth and sixth piano sonatas, and of the fifth and sixth string quartets, are taken from this source. The piano sonatas, as well as his Piano Concerto The Quest (1996) and other later works, make use of folk melodies from his native Romania, integrating them with his spectral techniques.

== Selected works ==
- Taaroa (1969) for orchestra
- Credo for 9 celli (1969)
- Flood for the Eternal's Origins (1970) for global sound sources
- Everlasting Longings (1972) for 24 strings
- in ko 'tro – Mioritic Space (1973) for 11 reciters, string orchestra, electronic and nature sound
- Capricorn's nostalgic crickets (1972/1980) for seven identical woodwinds
- Hierophany (1973) recitation in 42 languages with 42 children
- Wild Incantesimo (1978) for 9 orchestras, 162 players
- Lamento di Gesù (1973–75) for large orchestra and 7 psalteries
- A Doini (1974) for 17 players with sound icons (bowed vertical concert grand pianos spectrally retuned)
- Thirteen Dreams Ago (1978) for 11×3 strings – 11 live with two pre-recordings (or 33 strings live)
- Doruind (1976) for 48 voices in 7 groups
- Do Emerge Ultimate Silence (1974/84) for 34 children's voices in groups with 34 spectrally tuned monochords
- Fourth String Quartet – "infinite to be cannot be infinite, infinite anti-be could be infinite" (1976–87) for 9 string quartets, i.e. 8 (spectral scordatura of 128 strings) around the audience and one in the center
- Outer Time (1980) for 23 flutes or 42 gongs or trio basso or two spectrally retuned grand pianos or 8 brass – 4 trumpets and 4 trombones
- Inner Time (1983) for solo clarinet; Inner Time II (1993) for 7 clarinets
- Iubiri (Amours) (1980/1) for 16 players & sound icons (if live, another 3 players)
- Clepsydra (1983) for 16 players with sound icons
- Das Andere (1983) for viola sola or cello solo or violin solo or double bass solo tuned in perfect fifths
- Astray (1983/84) for two duos: each of one player with 6 saxes & of one player with a sound icon – score on color slides
- Awakening infinity (1983) for large ensemble of 25 players
- Frenetico il longing di amare (1984) for bass voice, octobass flute, sound icon
- Dizzy Divinity I (1985) for (bass, alto or grand) flute
- Sensual Sky (1985) for ensemble: fl in G, cl., alto sax, trombone, sound icon, violin, viola, cello, double bass
- Intimate Rituals (1985) for 4 sound icons with or without other soloists
- "forefeeling" remembrances (1985) for 14 identical voices
- Christe Eleison (1986) for organ
- Mirabilia Mundi – music for the Speyer Basilica (1986) for 7 large groups – up to 88 players
- Byzantine Prayer (1988) for 40 flautists with 72 flutes
- Dr. Kai Hong's Diamond Mountain (1991) for 61 spectral gongs and soloists
- Second Piano Sonata – "being and non-being create each other" (1991)
- Animae morte carent (1992/95) for oboe d'amore and spectral piano
- Third Piano Sonata – "you will endure forever" (1992/99)
- Angolo Divino (1993/94) for large orchestra
- Amen (1993/94) for organ
- Fifth String Quartet – "before the universe was born" (1990/95)
- Piano Concerto "The Quest" (1996)
- Sixth String Quartet "practicing eternity" (1992)
- Fourth Piano Sonata "like a well ... older than God" (1993)
- Amor medicabilis nullis herbis (1996) for soprano, clarinet and violoncello
- lux animae for violoncello (1996) or viola (2000)
- l'exil interieur (1997) sonata for cello and piano
- Fifth Piano Sonata "settle your dust, this is the primal identity" (2003)
- Cinerum (2005) for four voices and ensemble with period instruments
- Sixth Piano Sonata "return to the source of light" (2007)

== Discography ==
- Intimate Rituals. Sub Rosa, 2006. Contains Das Andere, Agnus Dei, Lux Animae II, Intimate Rituals XI. Vincent Royer, viola, with Gérard Caussé, Petra Junken and Horațiu Rădulescu.
- Lao tzu Sonatas. cpo, 2004. Contains Piano Sonatas nos. 2 (being and non-being create each other), 3 (you will endure forever), and 4 (like a well... older than God). Ortwin Stürmer, piano.
- Streichquartett nr. 4 (infinite to be cannot be infinite, infinite anti-be could be infinite) opus 33. Edition RZ, 2001. Arditti Quartet.
- The Quest: Piano Concerto, Op. 90. cpo, 1998. Ortwin Stürmer, piano, Radio-Sinfonie-Orchester Frankfurt conducted by Lothar Zagrosek.
- Sensual Sky, Op. 62; Iubiri, Op.43. Adès, 1996. Ensemble Polychromie conducted by Nvart Andreassian.
- Inner Time II, Op. 42. Auvidis, 1994. Armand Angster, "Clarinet System".
- Horațiu Rădulescu. Adda, 1993. Contains Dizzy Divinity I, Byzantine Prayer, Frenetico Il Longing di Amare, Capricorn's Nostalgic Crickets II. Pierre-Yves Artaud, flute, Orchestre Français de Flûtes conducted by Horațiu Rădulescu assisted by Pierre-Alain Biget.
