= London Oriana Choir =

Choral group in London, England

London Oriana Choir is a choral group comprising around 120 singers, based in London, England. It was formed in 1973 by Leon Lovett, who acted as conductor and musical director. David Drummond became the choir's musical director in 1996, and Dominic Ellis-Peckham began his term as musical director in September 2013. The choir has developed a following through performances at London venues including the Royal Albert Hall, Barbican Centre, Royal Festival Hall and Queen Elizabeth Hall at Southbank, St Paul's Cathedral, St Martin-in-the-Fields and St James' Piccadilly. In 2016 the choir launched a five-year project 'five15' to promote the work of women composers with 15 new commissions from five composers, workshops and recordings. The five commissioned composers-in-residence were Cheryl Frances-Hoad (2016/17), Rebecca Dale (2017/18), Jessica Curry (2018/19), Anna Disley-Simpson (2019-2021), and Hannah Kendall (2021/22). Composer Cecilia McDowall accepted the role of Patron of the choir in 2021. The choir celebrated its 50th anniversary in the 2023/24 season, commissioning a new piece 'Here Hum The Bees' from Cecilia McDowall, which was premiered at a gala concert at St John's Smith Square in March 2024.

The choir tours regularly and since 2015 has performed in France, Portugal, Germany, Malta, Poland, and Italy.

== Notable performances ==
=== Under Dominic Ellis-Peckham ===
- Gala concert '50 Years of Song' at St John's Smith Square in March 2024, with special guest Beth Nielsen Chapman.
- Celebrating the end of the five15 women composers initiative in July 2022 with a Women Composers Festival concert at the Queen Elizabeth Hall, London, with guest choirs and a number of women composers.
- Performing the world premiere of Eric Whitacre's piece The Perfect Gift commissioned by Maggie's charity for a virtual carol concert in December 2020.
- Performing with Madonna at the Eurovision Song Contest Final in Tel Aviv in May 2019. The choir supplied the monks' chorus for "Like a Prayer".
- Opening the BAFTA Games Awards ceremony in the Queen Elizabeth Hall, London, with a performance of The End of All Things by previous Award winner Jessica Curry.
- Launching a five-year project 'five 15' to promote the work of women composers in the Sammy Ofer gallery of the Cutty Sark, in Greenwich in July 2016.
- Classic Quadrophenia, an orchestral and choral version of The Who's Quadrophenia album, released on Deutsche Grammophon in June 2015 and performed at the Royal Albert Hall in July 2015.

=== Under David Drummond ===
- Missing God, a work by composer Sophie Viney commissioned under the Society for the Promotion of New Music's Adopt a Composer programme, and performed at St Martin-in-the-Fields in 2003
- An invited performance at Mikhail Gorbachev's 80th birthday at the Lebedev residence at Hampton Court Palace near London
- Performing with Beth Nielsen Chapman at St Paul's Cathedral for the DVD recording of "If love could say God's name"
- Performing with Robert Plant and his Band of Joy at the BBC Electric Proms in 2010, broadcast live on BBC2 (television) and BBC Radio 2
- Performing concerts composed solely of choral music composed by women to celebrate International Women's Day in 2012 and 2013
- Performing with Barbra Streisand at the Barbra Live concert series in London, UK at The O2 Arena

=== Under Leon Lovett ===
Leon Lovett directed the choir from its inception until 1996. During this time, the choir regularly performed at the Royal Albert Hall, on BBC television and venues around London.

== Recordings ==
- Christmas e-singles (2025): "Carol of the Bells" by Mykola Leontovych, and 'Silent Night' by Franz Xaver Gruber arranged by Wolfgang Lindner.
- "Her Voice" (2024): album of the nine a capella pieces commissioned as part of the choir's five15 project
- E-single (2022): 'In the blue' by Anna Disley-Simpson (first release of a piece commissioned under the choir's five15 initiative).
- E-singles (2019): 'In the stillness' by Sally Beamish, 'Vespertilians' by Jocelyn Hagen, and 'Laus Trinitati' by Felicia Sandler
- "From Babylon to Brazil" (2015) featuring the world premiere recording of Toby Young's 'Ave Regina Caelorum'
- "The Lady Oriana" (2016) featuring 'O nata lux' by award-winning composer Kerry Andrew.
- "Nativitie", a Christmas album released in 2012. Includes the premiere recording of Kenneth Leighton's "Nativitie".
- Armstrong Gibbs "Odysseus" recorded with the BBC Concert Orchestra
- Walford Davies "Everyman" recorded with the Kensington Symphony Orchestra and released in 2008
- "Stuff and Nonsense" (1999) featuring Richard Rodney Bennett's 'Nonsense' songs, John Gardner's 'Seven Songs' and George MacIlwham's 'Tam O'Shanter'.
