= Piano extended techniques =

Alternative methods of playing piano

Piano extended techniques are methods of playing the piano where unconventional techniques are used to obtain different sounds from the piano.

== History ==
Although some of these techniques had been explored by earlier composers such as Robert Schumann, the use of these techniques was not widely practised until the 20th century.

Composers such as Béla Bartók started to look at the piano as a more percussive instrument and explored various techniques to achieve percussive effects. His Bagatelles and Mikrokosmos, the series of works for the instruction of young pianists, both contain unconventional instructions to the pianist. He used special notation for certain of them: "hold keys silently" is indicated by square note heads rather than the usual round ones. Karlheinz Stockhausen took these ideas further in his series of works entitled Klavierstücke in which the pianist is often instructed to wear protective gloves while playing cluster glissandi with the hands. Henry Cowell also explored these techniques. Sofia Gubaidulina, in her Sonata, instructs the pianist to use non-traditional sounds: sounds produced by a glissando performed with a bamboo stick on the piano pegs against a cluster performed on the keyboard; a "buzzing" sound created by placing the bamboo stick on vibrating strings; pizzicato effects produced by plucking the strings; glissando effects produced by rubbing along the strings using a fingernail; and a muted effect produced by touching the strings. Jennifer Stasack, Crossing Rivers IV, Movement IV, instructs the pianist to use the palms for the white notes (clustered) and flat hands for the black notes (also clustered).

Composers may also instruct the pianist to partially damp strings with the finger tips to create harmonics (e.g. George Crumb, Eleven Echoes of Autumn, Eco I).

=== Prepared piano ===
Another technique involves the physical "preparation" of the piano using foreign objects inserted between the strings or attached to the hammers. John Cage pioneered this technique. He worked with another pioneer in the field of extended techniques, David Tudor.

=== Modified construction ===
Pianos have also been constructed that include microtones (and extra keys to hit their strings).

== Techniques ==
- prepared piano, i.e. introducing foreign objects into the workings of the piano to change the sound quality
- string piano, i.e. hitting or plucking the strings directly or any other direct manipulation of the strings
- sound icon, i.e. placing a piano on its side and bowing the strings with horsehair and other materials
- whistling, singing or talking into the piano (with depressed sustain pedal)
- silently depressing one or more keys, allowing the corresponding strings to vibrate freely, thus creating harmonics of the struck or plucked strings.
- percussive use of different parts of the piano, such as the outer rim. This can include devices to create continuous sounds on the body of the piano, e.g. rubbing the surface of the piano with objects such as rubber balls, etc.
- flageolet: creating harmonics by touching overtone positions on the string with the finger of one hand and hitting the respective key with the other hand
- use of the palms of the hands or the fists—or indeed other body parts—to strike the keys: a technique sometimes known as "piano bashing".
- use of other materials to strike the keys, e.g. battery-operated motors with plastic gears to create continuous string vibrations, as in works by Roger Reynolds.
- bowing the strings with bundles of rosined fishing line or horsehair - introduced by John Cage and used extensively by composer Stephen Scott.
- palm muting, i.e. placing one hand on the string(s) to mute them while playing the keys with the other hand. Muting can also be provided by placing materials on the strings.
- amplification with phonograph cartridges and/or contact microphones, or regular microphones. The sound output can then be subject to alteration, distortion, recording and playback, etc.
