= Mikrokosmos (Bartók) =

Six-volume progressive set of piano pieces by Béla Bartók

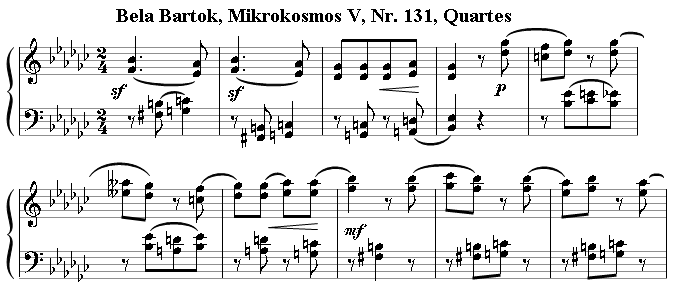
The first 10 measures of No. 131, "Fourths"

Béla Bartók's Mikrokosmos (Hungarian: Mikrokozmosz) Sz. 107, BB 105 consists of 153 progressive piano pieces in six volumes, written between 1926 and 1939 and published in 1940. The individual pieces progress from very easy and simple beginner études to very difficult advanced technical displays, and are used in modern piano lessons and education. In total, according to Bartók, the work "appears as a synthesis of all the musical and technical problems which were treated and in some cases only partially solved in the previous piano works." Volumes one and two are dedicated to his son Péter, while volumes five and six are intended as professionally performable concert pieces.

Bartók also indicated that these pieces could also be played in different arrangements. In 1940, shortly before they emigrated to the United States, he arranged seven of the pieces for two pianos, to provide additional repertoire for himself and his wife Ditta Pásztory-Bartók to play. Tibor Serly transcribed six of the pieces for piano and string orchestra, arrangements which were first performed on the composer's 61st birthday in 1942. In 1969 Huguette Dreyfus recorded selected pieces from Books 3 to 6 on the harpsichord.

The pieces are notable for their display of folk music influence, their unusual use of tonality, and their use of additive rhythms. Bartók travelled extensively during the period 1906–1936 to rural Hungary, Romania, Algeria and Turkey, transcribing folk songs and dances; that influence is especially apparent in the Six Dances in Bulgarian Rhythm at the end of Mikrokosmos, as well as in his (separate) set of Romanian Folk Dances (1915).

== Title ==
The title Mikrokosmos comes from the Greek mikros kosmos, meaning "little world", to reflect Bartók's aim that the pieces "deal not only with the rhythmic, but also with melodic, harmonic and pianistic problems."

The works were first published with the subtitle "Progressive Pieces for Piano" to emphasise the collection's didactic structure. Ernst Roth, as representative of the publisher Boosey & Hawkes, initially suggested "Progressive Piano Pieces in Modern Idiom", but this was rejected by Bartok on the grounds that "in 20, or let us say in 40 years this work will cease to be 'modern.' And what does it mean 'modern'? This word has no definite sense, can be misinterpreted, misunderstood!"

== Volumes ==
The pieces progress gradually in difficulty through the entire collection, from number 1 at the beginning of volume I to number 153 at the end of volume VI.

- Volumes I and II: Pieces 1–36 and 37–66, beginner level
- Volumes III and IV: Pieces 67–96 and 97–121, moderate to advanced level
- Volumes V and VI: Pieces 122–139 and 140–153, professional level

The list of pieces is as follows:

Volume I

1. Six Unison Melodies (I)
2. (a) Six Unison Melodies (II)

(b) Six Unison Melodies (II)

3. Six Unison Melodies (III)
4. Six Unison Melodies (IV)
5. Six Unison Melodies (V)
6. Six Unison Melodies (VI)
7. Dotted Notes
8. Repetition (1)
9. Syncopation (I)
10. With Alternate Hands
11. Parallel Motion
12. Reflection
13. Change of Position
14. Question and Answer
15. Village Song
16. Parallel Motion with Change of Position
17. Contrary Motion
18. Four Unison Melodies (I)
19. Four Unison Melodies (II)
20. Four Unison Melodies (III)
21. Four Unison Melodies (IV)
22. Imitation and Counterpoint
23. Imitation and Inversion (I)
24. Pastorale
25. Imitation and Inversion (II)
26. Repetition (II)
27. Syncopation (II)
28. Canon at the Octave
29. Imitation Reflected
30. Canon at the Lower Fifth
31. Dance in Canon Form
32. In Dorian Mode
33. Slow Dance
34. In Phrygian Mode
35. Chorale
36. Free Canon

Volume II

37. In Lydian Mode
38. Staccato and Legato (I)
39. Staccato and Legato (Canon)
40. In Yugoslav Style
41. Melody with Accompaniment
42. Accompaniment in Broken Triads
43. (a) In Hungarian Style (for two pianos)

(b) In Hungarian Style

44. Contrary Motion (2) (for two pianos)
45. Meditation
46. Increasing-Diminishing
47. County Fair
48. In Mixolydian Mode
49. Crescendo-Diminuendo
50. Minuetto
51. Waves
52. Unison Divided
53. In Transylvanian Style
54. Chromatics
55. Triplets in Lydian Mode (for two pianos)
56. Melody in Tenths
57. Accents
58. In Oriental Style
59. Major and Minor
60. Canon with Sustained Notes
61. Pentatonic Melody
62. Minor Sixths in Parallel Motion
63. Buzzing
64. (a) Line against Point

(b) Line against Point

65. Dialogue (with voice)
66. Melody Divided

Volume III

67. Thirds against a Single Voice
68. Hungarian Dance (for two pianos)
69. Study in Chords
70. Melody against Double Notes
71. Thirds
72. Dragons' Dance
73. Sixths and Triads
74. (a) Hungarian Matchmaking Song

(b) Hungarian Matchmaking Song (with voice)

75. Triplets
76. In Three Parts
77. Little Study
78. Five-Tone Scale
79. Hommage à Johann Sebastian Bach
80. Hommage à Robert Schumann
81. Wandering
82. Scherzo
83. Melody with Interruptions
84. Merriment
85. Broken Chords
86. Two Major Pentachords
87. Variations
88. Duet for Pipes
89. In Four Parts (I)
90. In Russian Style
91. Chromatic Invention (I)
92. Chromatic Invention (II)
93. In Four Parts (II)
94. Once Upon a Time...
95. (a) Fox Song

(b) Fox Song (with voice)

96. Jolts

Volume IV

97. Notturno
98. Thumbs Under
99. Hands Crossing
100. In Folk Song Style
101. Diminished Fifth
102. Harmonics
103. Minor and Major
104. (a) Wandering through the Keys

(b) Wandering through the Keys

105. Game (with Two Five-Tone Scales)
106. Children's Song
107. Melody in the Mist
108. Wrestling
109. From the Island of Bali
110. And the Sounds Clash and Clang...
111. Intermezzo
112. Variations on a Folk Tune
113. Bulgarian Rhythm (I)
114. Theme and Inversion
115. Bulgarian Rhythm (II)
116. Song
117. Bourrée
118. Triplets in 9/8 Time
119. Dance in 3/4 Time
120. Triads
121. Two-Part Study

Volume V

122. Chords Together and in Opposition
123. (a) Staccato and Legato (II)

(b) Staccato and Legato (II)

124. Staccato
125. Boating
126. Change of Time
127. New Hungarian Folk Song (with voice)
128. Stamping Dance
129. Alternating Thirds
130. Village Joke
131. Fourths
132. Major Seconds Broken and Together
133. Syncopation (III)
134. (a) Studies in Double Notes

(b) Studies in Double Notes
(c) Studies in Double Notes

135. Perpetuum mobile
136. Whole-Tone Scales
137. Unison
138. Bagpipe Music
139. Merry Andrew

Volume VI

140. Free Variations
141. Subject and Reflection
142. From the Diary of a Fly
143. Divided Arpeggios
144. Minor Seconds, Major Sevenths
145. (a) Chromatic Invention (III)

(b) Chromatic Invention (III)

146. Ostinato
147. March
148. Six Dances in Bulgarian Rhythm (I)
149. Six Dances in Bulgarian Rhythm (II)
150. Six Dances in Bulgarian Rhythm (III)
151. Six Dances in Bulgarian Rhythm (IV)
152. Six Dances in Bulgarian Rhythm (V)
153. Six Dances in Bulgarian Rhythm (VI)

== Music ==
The opening (mm. 1–76) of "Boating" (V, 125) is typical of the modernist compositional techniques used in the later volumes, featuring the bimodal use of the pentatonic collection on E♭ in the right hand and either G mixolydian or dorian collections in the left:

Volume VI contains the "Six Dances In Bulgarian Rhythm", dedicated to the English pianist Harriet Cohen. Bulgarian folk music is characterized by additive rhythm, that is, rhythm where the beats in each bar are of unequal length. For example, the first dance (148) is grouped into 4+2+3/8 (nine quavers in each bar), and the final dance (153) is grouped into 3+3+2/8 (eight in each bar).

Some pieces utilize extended technique, such as stomping or tapping in piece 9, holding down keys silently in piece 102, or singing in pieces 14, 65, and 127.

Pianists who have recorded all six volumes include György Sándor, Edith Farnadi, Homero Francesch, Zoltán Kocsis, Dezső Ránki, Jenő Jandó, Claude Helffer, and Georges Solchany. Bartók himself was the first to publicly perform pieces from Mikrokosmos, on February 9, 1937, in London.
