= Sound icon =

Musical instrument

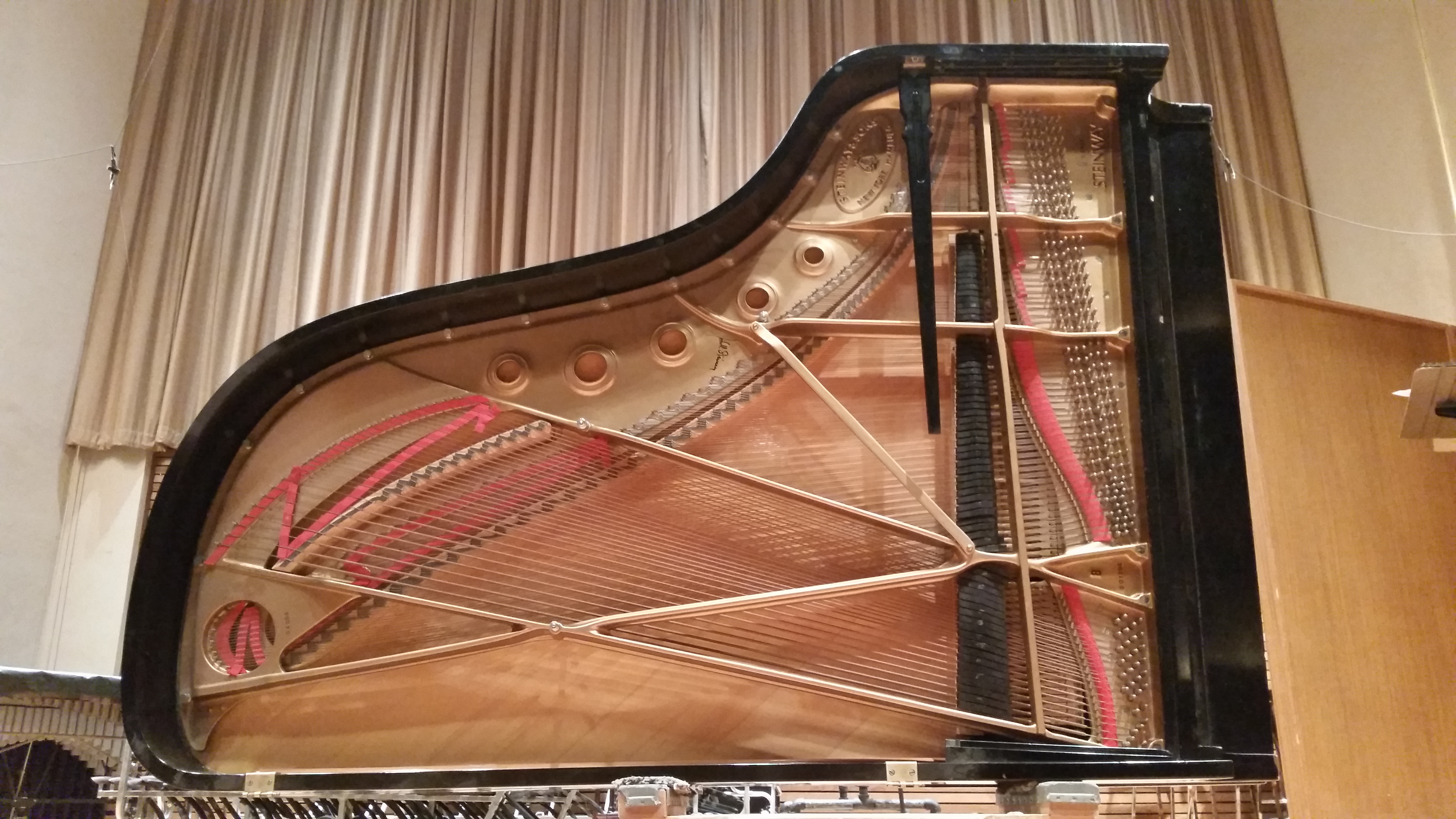

String instrument
- Classification: string
- Inventor: Horațiu Rădulescu
- Developed: 1965
- Volume: low
- Attack: slow
- Decay: slow

Playing range
- C_{0} – B_{8}

A sound icon is a grand piano standing on its side. It is primarily played by bowing the strings. It was the invention of Romanian-French composer Horațiu Rădulescu, who featured the instrument in several of his pieces.

== Background ==
Horațiu Rădulescu first conceived of the sound icon in 1965. It consists of a lidless grand piano that has been placed on its side, so that it resembles a harp. Typically, nylon cords are rubbed with rosin and woven behind the piano strings. When the cord is bowed against the string, it creates a unique timbre which has been described as "sounds of an infinite resonance that have no equivalent among other instruments".

Rădulescu called his invention a sound icon, because he conceived it while living in Romania where "religion was only…possible through music". To Rădulescu, the striking image of the grand piano on its side presented the instrument "in a new light; it now resembles a religious object – a Byzantine icon". The name also has a punning connotation because its acronym is "si", the French and Italian syllable for "B".

== Technique ==
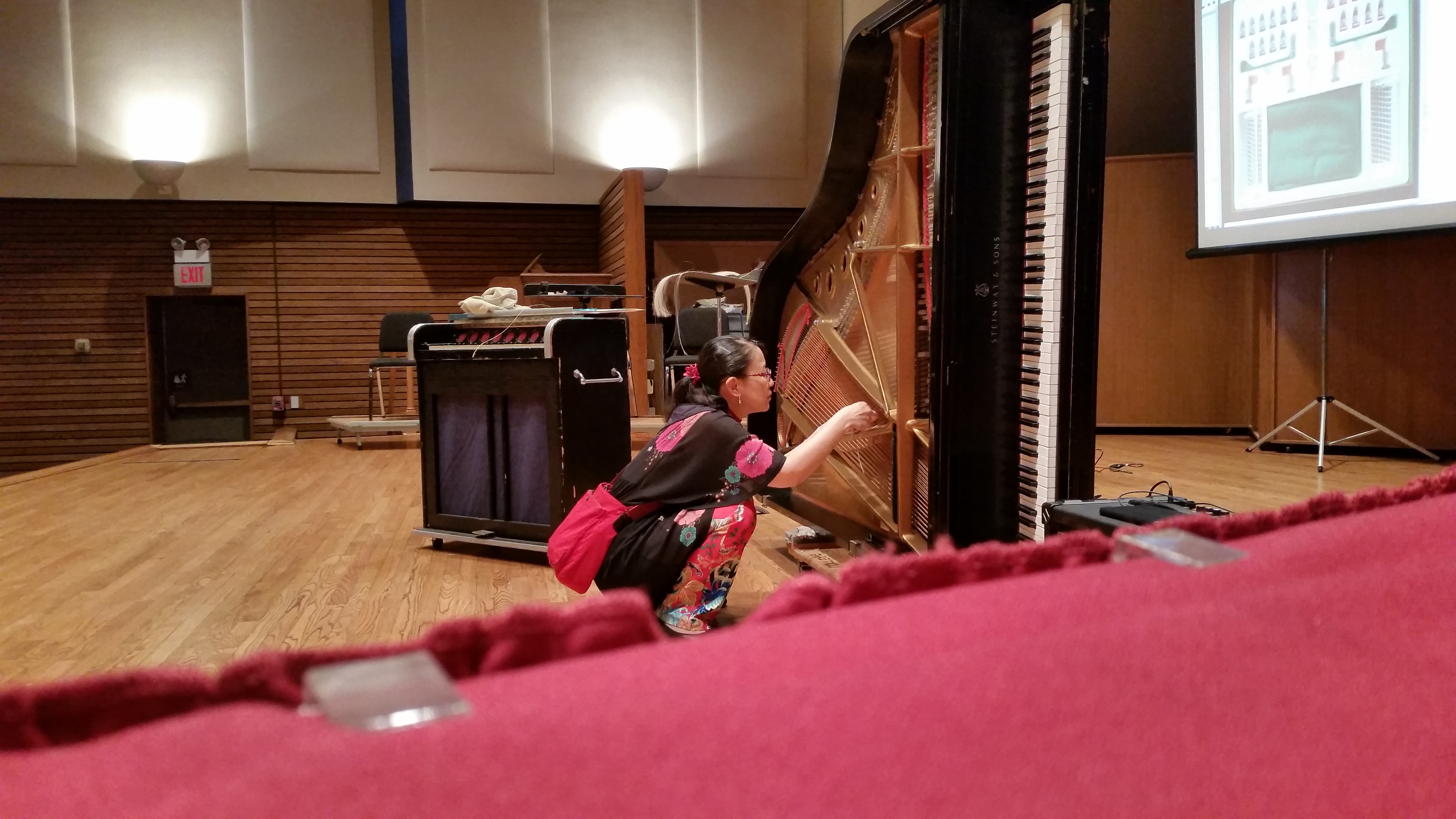
Composer Rica Narimoto experiments with the sound icon during the writing period at Iron Composer 2015.

Piano bowed with unrosined medium thread.

The sound icon is played in several ways. The primary technique is to bow the strings, a tradition which dates back to instruments like the bowed clavier and the hurdy gurdy. Unlike those instruments, which rely on rosined wheels to stimulate the string, the sound icon is bowed by weaving material between the strings. Rădulescu is reported to have used a variety of materials to both bow and pluck the piano strings, including fishing line as well as gold coins.

The seminal technique for bowing the sound icon is to use a single horsehair as thin as 0.1 mm in diameter. Rădulescu was preoccupied with "reversing the proportion of the bows and strings" usually found in a violin. He wound the horsehair in a "V" shape around the string. Bowing the horsehair makes the piano string vibrate and creates a sympathetic resonance in the other strings. The location of the bow on the string also creates a dramatic difference in the resulting sound. In works with multiple sound icons, Rădulescu would weave "spider webs of nylon threads of different thickness in between the pianos".

The lowest two strings of the piano played with heavy brass wire.

In each piece, Rădulescu would work out a very precise tuning for the sound icon to control the timbre of its sympathetic resonance. He called this tuning a "spectral scordatura". Rădulescu compared the droning nature of the sound icon to the Indian tanpura.

== Repertoire ==
Horațiu Rădulescu featured sound icon in the following works:

- I H I 19 – Requiem pour l'Azur, Op. 19 (1972) for harpsichord, sound icon, string quartet, 13 flutes, 19 dancers, 19 reciters.
- Star webs – musica caelorum, Op. 23b (1976) for 7 psalteries and 5 sound icons
- A Doini, Op. 24.1 (1974) for 17 players with sound icons
- Alt A Doini, Op. 24.2 (1980) for 17 players with sound icons
- Ecou Atins, Op. 31 (1979) ("to the blackbirds' tender look") bass & grand flute, horn in F, soprano, cello, sound icon with 3 players spectral scordatura, and 29 psalteries on tape.
- Outer Time, Op. 42 (1980) for 23 flutes or 14 bass flutes and 14 sound icons
- Iubiri, Op. 43 (1980–81) ("to my mother") for 16 players & taped sound icons
- Sound thought, Op. 45 (1982) for theorbo and sound icon
- Clepsydra, Op. 47 (1983) ("to Marco di Pasquale") for 16 players with sound icons
- Astray, Op. 50 (1983/84) for 2 saxophonists (playing 6 instruments) and 2 sound icons
- Frenetico il longing di amare, Op. 56 (1984) for bass voice, octobass flute, and sound icon
- Sensual Sky, Op.. 62 (1985) for alto flute, alto saxophone, trombone, sound icon, violin, viola, cello, double bass
- Intimate Rituals, Op. 63 (1985) for 4 sound icons with or without other soloists
- Intimate Rituals III, Op. 63.3 (1989) for cello and sound icons
- Intimate Rituals V, Op. 63.5 (1989) for cello and sound icons
- Intimate Rituals XI, Op. 63.11 (2003) for viola and sound icons
- trombe d'oro della solarità, Op. 65 (1985) for solo trombone (with sound icons),
- Vetrata, Op. 83 (1991) for 24 voices and 3 sound icons

== Legacy ==
Piano played with an ebow on the strings.

Because of the difficulty of vertically orienting a grand piano, composers often simply write for "bowed piano", using the technique that Rădulescu pioneered. Composers like John Oliver, Kirsten Broberg, and Stephen Scott have all written for bowed piano. Scott even formed the Bowed Piano Ensemble. Bands like Wilco and the Nitty Gritty Dirt Band have also used bowed piano.

In 2015, the sound icon was assigned as part of the instrumentation at Iron Composer.
