= Sophie Viney =

English composer and arranger

- Born: 1974 (age 51–52); United Kingdom
- Education: Royal College of Music, London; Guildhall School of Music & Drama
- Occupations: Composer, arranger & teacher
- Known for: Missing God
- Notable work: Sonatina in 7 & 5; Music of the Spheres; Kingdom of Heaven; A Time to Dance
- Website: sophiesnotes.com

Sophie Viney (born 1974) is an English composer and arranger. Her compositions have been performed at significant venues such as the Royal Festival Hall, Wigmore Hall and St. Martin-in-the-Fields and her music has featured in the Spitalfields Festival and the Brighton Festival. In February 1999, Viney received critical acclaim in The Times for her work Music of the Spheres which was described as "eerily conjured". Her choral work Missing God was commissioned under the Society for the Promotion of New Music's Adopt a Composer programme and performed by the London Oriana Choir in 2003. She has written for the Philharmonia and has also written for theatre groups such as Watford Palace Theatre, and Barbican Studio Theatre. On 7 March 2015, Sonatina in 7 and 5 was broadcast on BBC Radio 3 as part of a programme aired on the eve of International Women's Day. Her music is influenced by phenomena ranging from the wedding chant of Masai warriors to passages from scripture.

== Biography ==
Viney began composing around the age of 7 or 8 and in the years that followed, developed her craft to the extent that she gained entry to the Royal College of Music studying composition with Jeremy Dale Roberts and Simon Bainbridge. Whilst studying for her BMus she also studied piano and conducting. After graduating, she undertook postgraduate study at the Guildhall School of Music and Drama with Robert Saxton where she gained a Master of Music in composition. Viney has received awards for composition, amongst them, the Adrian Cruft prize and the Sullivan and Farrer prize and she was awarded a Fellowship by the Arts Council to facilitate the researching of her opera on a theme inspired by the Gaarder novel, Through a Glass Darkly.

== Selected works ==
- A Time to Dance
- Dartmoor Theme
- Detective Theme
- Kingdom of Heaven
- Missing God
- Music of the Spheres
- Norfolk Suite (Three movements)
- Sonatina in 7 & 5
- To The Seaforths

=== Arrangements ===
- Ting-a-ling (Reprise)
- We Know Where They Are
- When This Bloody War is Over

=== Music for theatre ===
- All's Well that Ends Well
- Monster Song (from The Wild Things show)
- Staring Magic (from The Wild Things show)
- Wild Rumpus Dance (from The Wild Things show)

=== Music for film ===
- Voyage instrumental track (used by Vagabonds Cinema)
