= Mystery Mansion (board game) =

Board game

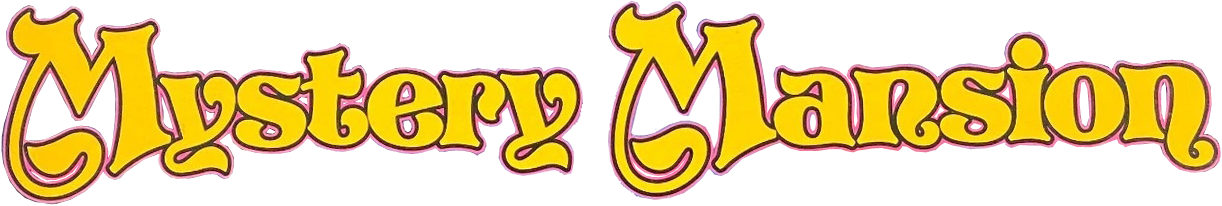
- Publishers: Milton Bradley
- Publication: 1984; 41 years ago
- Years active: 1984–?
- Genres: Board game
- Languages: English
- Players: 3–4
- Playing time: 90'
- Age range: 8+

Mystery Mansion is the name of a series of board games in which players search furniture and other objects inside a mansion to locate a hidden treasure or stash of money.

The first version of the game was released by the Milton Bradley Company in 1984, the same year when Hasbro took over that company. Instead of a standard game board, the original Mystery Mansion features a modular board where players build the mansion by adding new rooms drawn at random.

Hasbro then released an electronic talking version under its Parker Brothers brand in the 1990s. In this version, game play is guided by a computerized talking "electronic organizer", providing clues and other information to players during each game. Also, the modular board design was scrapped in favor of a fixed board, loosely similar to the one for Cluedo. However, the content in each varied from each game.

== Original 1984 version ==
=== Equipment ===
The original Mystery Mansion featured a modular board consisting of 24 cardboard tiles representing different rooms in the mansion: eight first floor rooms, eight second floor rooms, and eight rooms in the cellar. Each room has different doors and objects that come into play during the game. The Foyer is positioned face up as the starting room of the game; all other rooms are shuffled face down and set to the side. A card representing the mansion's outside front door entrance is then placed next to Foyer so that the staircase leads up to the double doors of the Foyer. Those double doors are the only way out of the mansion.

Each player is represented by one of four plastic pawns placed on the front door entrance card at the start of the game.

Also before the game, seven cardboard treasure tokens (two representing the "real treasure", and five representing cobwebs or the "fake treasure") are randomly placed in one of the seven plastic treasure chests. Each treasure chest has a label on its bottom with two numbers on it, representing the two keys that will unlock it (see below). The treasure chests are then mixed up so no player knows which two have the real treasure, or knows which keys will open those two real treasures.

Other items include:

- A six-sided "door" die, with either the words "open" or "locked" on its faces.
- 12 plastic staircases
- Eight plastic secret passage doors
- A deck of 72 "Search" cards and a deck of 56 "Clue" cards. Each player is only dealt five Search cards at the start of the game. Once the cards are used up, one player must shuffle them and put them back to be "reused".

=== Rules ===
Players take turns in order, with the initial player determined by a consensus before the game. During a turn, a player takes 3 "actions". An action can be one of the following:

Rolling the "door" die
Rolling the die is the primary way to move from one room to the other. It is also the only way to move back and forth between the Foyer and the front door entrance. Rolling "locked" prevents a player from moving to the next room, and thus automatically ends that action. If the player rolls "open", then (s)he can either move into an adjoining room already in place, or add and move into a new room.

When adding a new room, the player randomly picks one from the pile of unused ones. One restriction is that a door in the new room must line up with a door in the room that the player is in so a doorway is formed between the two. A second restriction is that a room needs to be either on the same level, or one level above or below the level the player is on (i.e. a doorway cannot directly connect the cellar with the second floor). The plastic staircases are used to basically indicate doorways connecting one level to another.

Play a Search card
Each time a player plays and discards a Search card from the ones in his/her hand, (s)he draws a new one from the draw pile to replenish his/her hand. The different search cards include:

- Object cards

An Object card lists two objects. In order to play an object card, the player needs to be in the same room with one of those two objects. Then when playing an object card, the player must show the other opponents the card, and announce the object being "searched". After the card is discarded, and a new Search card is drawn to replenish his/her hand, the player then takes the top card from the Clue draw pile.

- "Steal A Search Card From Any Player"

Entitles a player to randomly take a Search card from any other player.

- "Change Places With Any Player"

Directs a player to change places with an opponent.

- "Move into an occupied room"

Entitles a player to immediately move to any room that is occupied by an opponent.

- "Lose one action of your turn"

Not only does the player lose one of his 3 actions, but also playing this card counts as one as well.

- "Oops, you been waylaid! No clue here."

Useless card, but still counts as an action when played and discarded.

Play a Clue card
As previously mentioned, a player receives a Clue card after playing an Object Search card. Some types of Clue cards must be played immediately when drawn, and thus do not count towards one of the 3 actions. All the others can be kept and then played later.

- Cobwebs

Indicates that the player found nothing when searching the object. Must be played immediately.

- Treasure chest

Indicates that the player has found one of the 7 treasure chests. Must be played immediately. (S)he then randomly picks up one of the unused plastic treasure chests and places it in the room that (s)he is in. Since there are exactly 7 plastic treasure chests and exactly 7 treasure chest cards in the deck, these cards are then set aside out of play after being used, instead of being put back in the discard pile.

- Key cards

There are seven key cards in the deck, numbered 1 through 7. In order to "claim a treasure chest" with a key, the player must be in the same room with an unclaimed chest. Then when playing the card, the player picks up the chest and secretly looks at the bottom to see if any of the numbers match. If they do, the player then announces to the other opponents that(s)he has claimed that chest, and thus can move it out of the mansion (i.e. the player's pawn and the claimed chest can now move through the mansion together). The player cannot actually open the chest at this time. On the other hand, if the numbers don't match, then the player cannot claim the chest. Either way, the player then returns the key card back to his hand instead of discarding it.

- Steal a treasure

Enables a player to steal a treasure chest that already has been claimed by an opponent. The player playing this card must be in the same room as this opponent, but cannot be in either the Foyer or the front door entrance. When stealing a chest, the player also takes the key card that unlocks it.

- Steal a Clue card from every player.

Unlike the similar Search card, this entitles a player to randomly take a Clue card from every player instead of one. If one of those stolen cards is a key card belonging to an opponent's claimed treasure chest, the player must still physically move into the same room as the chest in order to claim it.

- Create a secret passage

Enables a player to create a secret passage. After playing the card, the player puts one of the plastic secret passage doors in the room (s)he is currently in, and then places another secret passage door and his/her pawn into another room. One restriction is that a secret passage door cannot be put into the Foyer. And secondly, a player with a claimed treasure chest cannot move though a secret passage.

- "You discover a secret hiding place...", "Suddenly the lights go out...", "A mysterious shadow is following you...", and "You hear mysterious footsteps..."

When drawn, the player must immediately follow its instructions, whether drawing or losing more cards, or moving into another room.

Travel through an existing secret passage
All the existing secret passages are essentially interconnected. A player in a room with a secret passage door can move into any other room with a secret passage door. It doesn't matter when each of the different passages were created. Again, a player carrying a claimed treasure chest cannot fit through a secret passage.

=== Winning the game ===
Once a player successfully moves his/her claimed treasure chest outside the mansion, (s)he can now open it. Before opening it, the player must show the other opponents both the numbers on the bottom of chest and the key card that unlocks it for verification. If it is one of the two "real" treasures, then (s)he wins. If it is one of the false treasures, that chest is then removed from play, and the player must head back inside the mansion.

=== Variations ===
Instead of picking rooms randomly, a pre-determined order or floor plan can be used instead.

== 1990s electronic version ==
=== Equipment ===
The 1990s electronic version features a battery-powered, hand-held, talking "electronic organizer" to guide game play. A number of different scenarios are pre-programmed into the computer. It also has the ability to save and restore an existing game, as well as restart a new game.

The 35 plastic pieces representing different types of furniture each piece has a number imprinted into it. This is the particular code number of that piece that is entered into the electronic organizer during game play. The game also comes with a small magnifying glass to help people read off the code numbers from the furniture pieces.

The playing area consists of a three-dimensional board, with cardboard walls, representing the mansion. Each room is also represented by a number that is entered into the electronic organizer. Among the eight player pieces that are included, four are shaped as boys and four are modeled as girls.

A stack of ten "Clue" cards consists of 2 key cards, 4 person cards (the Butler, the Chauffeur, the Cook, and the Maid), and 4 item cards (the letter, the map, the photos, and the tape).

In addition are 2 dice and an optional stack of 9 "Turn" cards.

It is also recommended that players have something to write down all the clues that the electronic organizer gives out during the course of the game.

Furniture numbers: Dining chair 111 Dining chair 112 Dining Table 113 China hutch 114 Couch 121 Coffee table 122 Bed 123 Dresser 124 Small book case 131 Refrigerator 132 Kitchen sink 133 Stove 134 Kitchen table 141 Pool table 142 Pinball machine 143 Large book case 144 Spa 211 Treadmill 212 Grand piano 213 Telescope 214 Clock 221 Computer desk 222 Jukebox 223 Rug 224 Fireplace 231 Knight statue 232 Television 233 Fish tank 234 Lamp 241 Planter 242 Easel 243 Black arm chair 244 Black arm chair 311 White arm chair 312 White arm chair 313

=== Rules ===
Like the original version, players start the game outside the mansion. And like the original, a player takes 3 "actions". An action can be one of the following:

Move into another room
A player can move into an adjacent room or move into a new, unfurnished room. If the latter, the player enters the room number into the electronic organizer, and it then lists the furniture to put in it.

The electronic organizer may instead announce that the new room is locked, and thus ask if the player has a key card. If the player does have one, (s)he can select "Yes" and move into the new room. If not, (s)he cannot enter. As soon as one player has unlocked a locked room with the key card, the furniture is put in and the room remains unlocked for the remainder of the game.

Look at a piece of furniture
The player searches a piece of furniture that's in the same room by entering its code number into the electronic organizer. It will then give out one of these responses:

- "You have found a clue"

Directs the player to draw a Clue card

- "Sorry, no clue here"

Indicates that the player found nothing when searching the object.

- "Take a Clue card from another player"

Entitles a player to take a particular Clue card from any other player.

- "Whoops! A trapdoor. Go to the entrance"

The player must move from the room to the entrance. If they have any remaining actions, they may immediately use their next action to move from the entrance into the adjacent room.

- It will beep several times as a warning, and then show a visual clue on its display for only the player to see.

- It will play an audio clue for all the players to listen to.

- It will first ask the player if (s)he has a particular person or item Clue card. If the player does have the card, the electronic organizer will then proceed to show a private visual clue.

"Let's talk"
Entitles a player to challenge an opponent for a specific Clue card. Both players then each roll the dice. The player initiating the challenge must roll the higher number to steal the opponent's card.

=== Winning the game ===
Using both the audio and visual clues provided by the electronic organizer throughout the course of the game, players need to discover the piece of furniture that the money is hidden in. When a player searches that specific piece of furniture, the electronic organizer will first ask if (s)he has a particular item Clue card. If the answer is yes, it will then ask if the player has a specific person Clue card. If the answer is also yes, then that player wins.

=== Optional "Turn" cards ===
There are nine optional "Turn" cards: three marked "Move", three marked "Look:, and three marked "Let's talk". These can be used by a player as flash card to keep track of their three actions during their turn.

== Other uses ==
In 2015, finalist Ryan Keebaugh selected Mystery Mansion as the secret ingredient for his piece during the Iron Composer competition.
