= Bimodality =

Concept in music theory

Bimodality is the simultaneous use of two distinct pitch collections. It is more general than bitonality since the "scales" involved need not be traditional scales; if diatonic collections are involved, their pitch centers need not be the familiar major and minor-scale tonics. One example is the opening (mm. 1–14) of Béla Bartók's "Boating" from Mikrokosmos (no. 125, vol. 5). Here, the right hand uses pitches of the pentatonic scale on E♭ and the left hand uses those of the diatonic hexachord on C, perhaps suggesting G dorian or G mixolydian.

Bartók's "Boating" RH and LH pitch collections (Stein 2005, pp. 82–83).

Bartók also uses the white-key and black-key collections (diatonic scale and its pentatonic complement) in no.6 of the Eight Improvisations, with the pentatonic as foreground, and in mm. 50–51 of the third movement of his Fourth Quartet, with the diatonic as foreground (Wilson 1992, p. 25).

Paul Wilson argues against analyzing Bartók's "Diminished Fifth" (Mikrokosmos vol. 4, no. 101) and "Harvest Song" (no. 33 of the Forty-Four Duos for two violins) as bitonal since in both "the larger octatonic collection embraces and supports both supposed tonalities" (Wilson 1992, p. 27). Here, the octatonic collection is partitioned into two four-note segments (4-10 or 0235) of the natural minor scales a tritone apart.

== Sources ==
- Stein, Deborah (2005). "Introduction to Musical Ambiguity". In Engaging Music: Essays in Music Analysis, fourth edition, edited by Deborah Stein, pp. 77–88. New York: Oxford University Press. ISBN 978-0-19-517010-8.
- Wilson, Paul (1992). The Music of Béla Bartók. New Haven and London: Yale University Press. ISBN 0-300-05111-5.
