= ARTSaha! =

Previous Nebraskan music festival

- Logo from ARTSaha! 2007
- Genre: Contemporary Classical
- Dates: Aug/Sep
- Locations: Omaha, Nebraska
- Years active: 2004–2008
- Founders: Joe Drew; Rudolf Kamper; Marcia Kamper
- Website: www.artsaha.org

ARTSaha! was Omaha's new music festival. Held in the late summer, it was an annual showcase of contemporary music and art that stresses interdisciplinary and collaborative projects. ARTSaha! was produced by ANALOG arts ensemble, a non-profit global collective of artists. It was founded in 2004 and held annually through 2008.

== History ==
ARTSaha! was established as a volunteer festival in 2004 by ANALOG. The first year featured a series of chamber music concerts with eclectic programs ranging from the Baroque to rock music. Highlights included a brass quintet version of Igor Stravinsky's The Rite of Spring, a rare Morton Feldman film score, and a concert of guerrilla electronic music.

ARTSaha! 2005 featured a production of Bach's Musical Offering where four ensembles performed the work simultaneously and the audience was able to create their own arrangement by moving between rooms. There were also outdoor performances of Alvin Lucier's Chambers in Omaha's Old Market, and Karlheinz Stockhausen's From the Seven Days on the Gene Leahy Mall. The festival also featured the meta-opera Notes from the Next Dark Age.

ARTSaha! 2006 highlighted the Samuel Beckett centenary with a program of several short plays, including Quad, Nacht und Träume, Breath, Come & Go, Not I, Rockaby and Act Without Words II. This was the first year of production funding for some events at the festival, such as the reworking of Jean-Philippe Rameau's The Festivities of Hebe. Other events continued to be produced on a fringe basis such as a concert of electronic music in the Mallory Kountze Planetarium. 2006 also saw the establishment of a production partnership between ANALOG and the University of Nebraska at Omaha.

ARTSaha! 2007 focused on Futurism with only the fourth US performance of George Antheil's original soundtrack for Ballet Mécanique. The festival also featured a 24-hour performance of John Cage's ASLSP, and the first Iron Composer Competition, where five student composers had five hours to complete a score for woodwind quintet based on a secret ingredient. The secret ingredient was the main motif to the theme song for the TV show The Jetsons.

ARTSaha! 2008 celebrated the 80th anniversary of Karlheinz Stockhausen's birth. ANALOG gave the US premieres of Friday Greeting and Cosmic Pulses, the latter of which is the last piece of electronic music Stockhausen ever composed. The Iron Composer competition was won by Hermes Camacho, a composer from California and living in Texas. The instrumentation was piano trio and the secret ingredient was Monet's Impression, Sunrise. Guest artists included Stuart Gerber (Stockhausen's last percussionist), Monument Piano Trio, dung, and the Microscore Project. The festival program also included several selections from George Brecht's Water Yam.
