= Jakub Polaczyk =

Polish composer, pedagogue, radio broadcaster and pianist

- Born: March 8, 1983 (age 43); Krakow, Poland
- Education: Jagiellonian University, Penderecki Music Academy, Carnegie Mellon University
- Occupations: Composer, pianist, pedagogue
- Website: https://www.jakub.polaczyk.com/

Jakub Polaczyk (born 1983 in Kraków) is a Polish-American composer and pianist based in New York City. His works bridge his Polish roots and global influences, blending tradition with ritual, spirituality, and an imaginative, eclectic compositional voice. As a performer, educator and cultural ambassador in NYC, his influence goesbeyond the concert hall to radio and community initiatives.

He is the recipient of many national and international awards, including Global Music Awards Silver Medalist (2023),, runner-up in the John Eaton Composition Competition by New York Composers Circle (2024),, winner of the Clouzine Magazine Best Instrumental Album (2024),American Prize in Composition 2020 and Iron Composer 2013..

He graduated from the Krzysztof Penderecki Academy of Music in Kraków, Jagiellonian University and Carnegie Mellon University. He studied in Poland with: Marcel Chyrzyński, Krzysztof Penderecki, Marek Chołoniewski (pl), in Belgium with Jan Van Landeghem and in the USA with Reza Vali. Since 2020 has been hosting program "Coffees After Bach" in the Polish Radio Chicago AM1030.

He currently teaches at The New York Conservatory of Music.. Between 2018-2023 Polaczyk was the vice president of the non for profit organization NYDAI and in 2020 - 2023 was the Artistic Director of the International Chopin & Friends Festival in NYC. " Conversations with Jakub Polaczyk" by Dennis Woytek got a Bronze statuette at the 43rd Telly Awards in New York City in 2023. Artist was awarded a Bronze medal by the Minister of Culture of Poland: "Gloria Artis Medal for Merit to Culture" in 2023. In 2024 Artist was awarded the honorable decoration from the city of Stary Sącz and the same year President of Poland awarded him Gold Cross Medal of Merit. In 2024 he was among the first musicians asked to access Chopin’s recently discovered Waltz at the Morgan Library & Museum. He completed a contemporary realization and arrangement of the fragment that was later published in 2025.
