= The Banshee (Cowell) =

1925 string piano composition by Henry Cowell

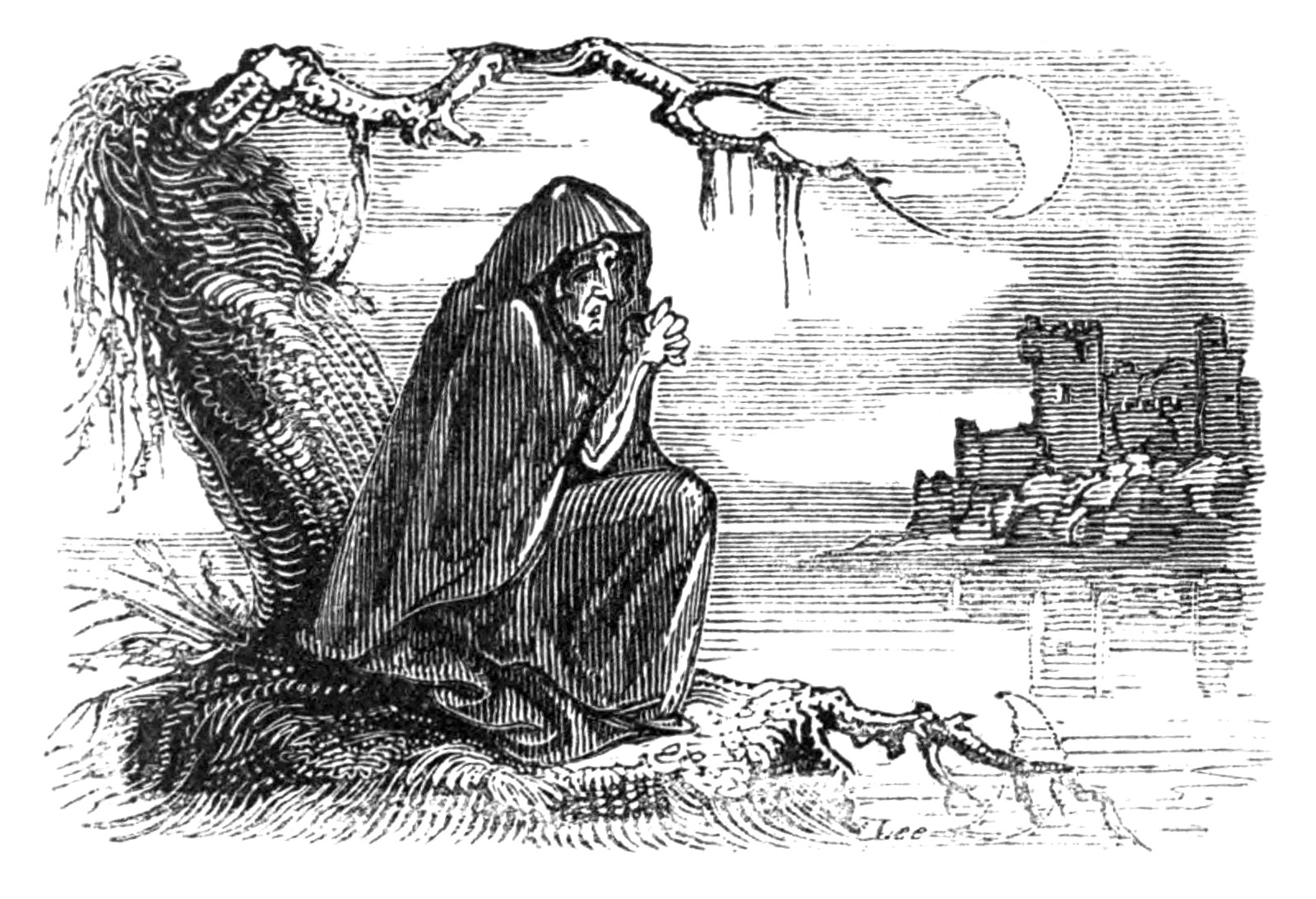
The banshee, a wailing spirit in Celtic mythology, serves as the inspiration for the piece

The Banshee (1925) is a piano composition by American composer Henry Cowell (1897–1965). It was the first piano piece ever written to be performed entirely free of the keyboard, using only manual manipulation of the strings within the instrument to produce sound via the flesh and nails of the finger.

Cowell stated that his inspiration in creating the "string piano" method of playing came from a desire to reinvent the landscape of piano technique, finding new usages and sounds for old instruments without necessarily inventing new ones. In addition to the string piano method changing the technical execution of producing sound, performance of The Banshee also required the performer to play the instrument in a new orientation, standing in the crook of the piano perpendicular to the strings, rather than seated at a bench. This process of re-education was an intentional element of the piece, making conservatory-trained pianists re-assume the role of a new student, forced to individually pick out the notes on the strings to learn their placement. Due to this performance style, The Banshee was also a disruption of the contemporary expectations of piano recitals, intended to create discomfort for the audience as well as the pianist.

Notated an octave higher, the score specifies 12 different methods for playing the strings, including the scraping of fingernails, using the flat of the hand, and the flesh of the fingers.
