= Nvart Andreassian =

Armenian conductor and teacher (born 1952)

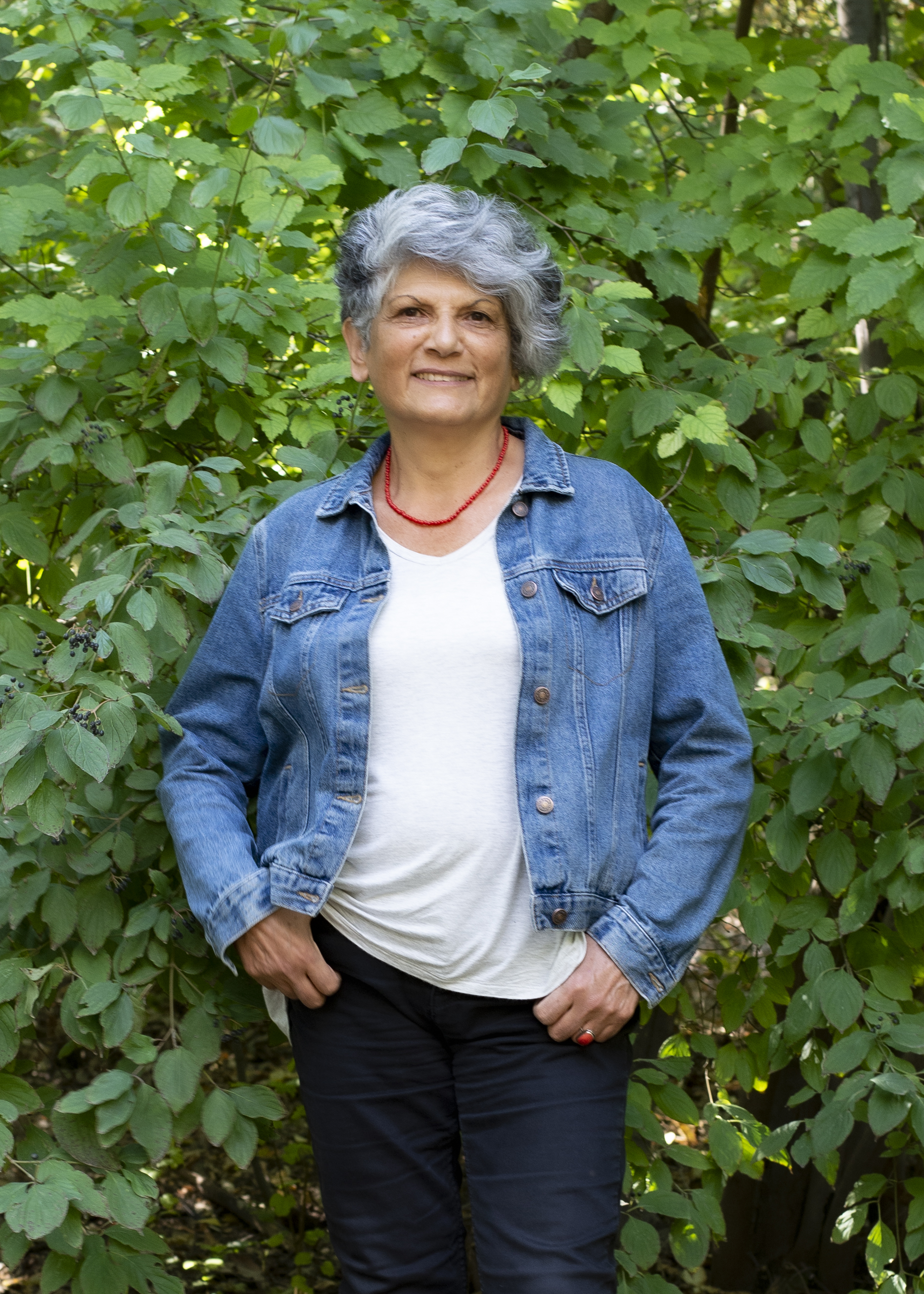
- Nvart Andreassian, Armenian conductor and teacher
- Born: 4 November 1952 (age 73); Istanbul, Turkey
- Occupations: Conductor and teacher

Nvart Andreassian (born 4 November 1952, in Istanbul) is an Armenian conductor and teacher. She has worked internationally in France, Germany, China, Armenia, and Turkey, with a focus on symphonic and contemporary music. She has also been active in teaching and in fostering Armenian–Turkish cultural dialogue through music.

== Biography ==
Andreassian was born in Istanbul into an Armenian intellectual family. In 1967, she moved to the Soviet Armenia, where she studied at the conducting department of Yerevan's Romanos Melikyan Music College under Herman Terteryan, graduating in 1971 with qualifications as a choir and orchestra conductor.

In 1974 she relocated to France, continuing her studies at the École Normale de Musique de Paris under Pierre Dervaux, where she developed her operatic and symphonic conducting skills and received a high-level conducting diploma. From 1976 to 1978 she was appointed assistant conductor at the Paris Grand Opera and the Orchestre de Paris. She also studied in master classes with Michel Tabachnik, Jean Fournet, Péter Eötvös, and Igor Markevitch. She took courses in musical analysis with Max Deutsch (modern and contemporary music), Roland Catoire (Romantic music), and attended advanced conducting classes with Sergiu Celibidache and Pierre Boulez.

In 2010, she returned to Turkey and founded the Turkey–Armenia Youth Symphony Orchestra, which brought together young musicians from both communities. She also collaborated with the Istanbul State Symphony Orchestra and the Bursa State Symphony Orchestra.

Andreassian resettled in Armenia in 2017 and received Armenian citizenship in 2018.

== Performances and tours ==
Andreassian has conducted widely in Europe, Asia, and South America. In France, she worked at the Paris Grand Opera and from 1980 to 2003 served as the leader and chief conductor of the Polychromie Ensemble of Contemporary Music. She also directed the Youth Orchestra of the Lille Conservatory (1980–1989) and other French ensembles dedicated to contemporary repertoire.

She was chief conductor of the Tianjin State Conservatory Youth Symphony Orchestra and the Tianjin State Symphony Orchestra in China between 1998 and 2001. Since 1996, she has toured in South America, including Brazil and Uruguay.

In Europe, she has led the Clara Schumann Symphony Orchestra (1985–1986), the European Contemporary Music Ensemble in Berlin (1988, 1990), and the French Contemporary Music Ensemble GRISS (1989). In Armenia, she was guest conductor of the National Opera of Armenia (1993–1995), the State Philharmonic Orchestra of Armenia, and the National Chamber Orchestra of Armenia (1995–1996). She also worked with the New Music Ensemble of the Union of Composers of Armenia.

Her international engagements have included concerts in Russia, Italy, Belgium, the Netherlands, Germany, China, and Turkey.

== Teaching activities ==
Andreassian has also had an extensive teaching career. From 1981 to 1989, she established and taught the choral and orchestral conducting department at the Conservatoire de Lille in France.

She has given master classes at the Moscow Tchaikovsky State Conservatory and taught contemporary performing arts at the Tianjin State Conservatory and the China Central Conservatory of Music in Beijing.

Since 2020, she has been teaching online courses in contemporary music analysis and conducting techniques.

== Awards ==
- 1979 – Finalist, International Competition of Young Conductors, Besançon, France
- 1980 – Yehudi Menuhin Foundation International Prize, Great Britain
- 1992–1993 – AFAA (France), Ambassador of French Contemporary Music
- 1993–1994 – SACEM (France), Promoter of Contemporary Music
