= Stephen Scott (composer) =

American composer (1944–2021)

Stephen Scott (October 10, 1944 – March 10, 2021) was an American composer best known for his development of the bowed piano. This is a form of extended technique which involves a grand piano being played by an ensemble of ten musicians who utilize lengths of rosined horsehair, nylon filament, and other utensils to bow the strings of the piano, creating an orchestra-like sound. Scott borrowed the technique from C. Curtis-Smith, who invented it in 1972. Scott founded the Bowed Piano Ensemble in 1977, for which he composed. His work is associated with the minimalist style of composition.

Scott studied with Homer Keller at the University of Oregon and subsequently with Ron Nelson and Gerald Shapiro. He taught music at Colorado College from 1969 to 2014, becoming a full professor there in 1989. He also taught at Evergreen State College and has served as visiting composer at the Aspen Music School, New England Conservatory of Music, Princeton University, the University of Southern California, and at several universities and conservatories in Australia and Europe.

Several recordings with Scott's Bowed Piano Ensemble have been released by New Albion Records, Albany Records, and Navona Records. Scott has performed and composed pieces in a thirteen limit tuning by Terry Riley.
