= Lost Treasure (board game) =

1982 board game

Electronic Deep-Sea Diving Game
- Publishers: Parker Brothers
- Players: 2-4
- Setup time: 5–10 minutes
- Playing time: 1 hour+
- Chance: Medium (dice rolling)
- Skills: Strategy

Lost Treasure is a board game published in 1982 by Parker Brothers. Billed as an electronic deep-sea diving game, Lost Treasure centers on the search for sunken treasure chests full of gold and silver.

== History ==
Lost Treasure is a guessing game that centers on a handheld electronic device known as the Digital Dive Control Center. The game came at a transformational moment in the industry, when the home video game console was starting to dominate sales. Parker Brothers made aggressive moves into that market by developing game cartridges for the Atari 2600 and Intellivision systems, featuring characters from Star Wars and The Lord of the Rings, as well as James Bond, Strawberry Shortcake, Popeye, and The Hulk.

== Board ==
The Lost Treasure board is designed to emulate a nautical chart of the islands spanning two bodies of water: Temptation Bay and the Sea of Opportunity. Within each archipelago, there are two ports where found treasure can be sold for cash.

Archipelago	Ports
The Mariner Islands	Fortunes Point, Pirate Landing
The Discovery Islands	Divers Landing, Recovery Point
The Windfall Islands	Sterling Point, Ingotsport
The Adventure Islands	Atlantis, Prosperity

A 24x24 grid is superimposed onto the board. The grid is organized into 64 sectors which each measure 3x3.

== Equipment ==
Boats – Each player is represented on the board by a red, yellow, white, or green boat piece.

Dice – The boats are moved one square at a time in any direction, according to the number rolled with the dice.

Buoys – There are 4 gold and 4 silver buoys which are used as guides to help the player narrow the search grid.

Treasure Chests – There are 16 treasure chests filled with either gold or silver.

Money – There are three denominations of money: $50,000 (green), $100,000 (gold), and $500,000 (blue).

Electronic Dive Control Center – The game is played by pressing the buttons on the device, which is powered by a 9-volt battery. The device automatically resets at the beginning of each game, assigning treasure locations at random. It emits a variety of chip music sounds to signal events during game play.

The device has two sets of indicators and three sets of buttons:

- On the left is a row of 6 red LEDs which indicate a variety of things throughout the game such as the amount of air in a scuba tank, the depth of a dive, and the monetary value of a treasure chest, which ranges from a minimum value of $100,000 to a maximum of $350,000.
- A compass rose is studded with 5 LEDs which illuminate to give directions to the players.
- A vertical row of 4 buttons are used as prefaces for typing in location guesses. Gold and silver each have 2 buttons apiece: N–S and E–W.
- A 9-button grid is used to type specific coordinate guesses during the game.
- A 4-button panel on the right serves a variety of functions. The “Air” button is used to fill up the scuba tanks for a dive. The “Up” button allows a diver to return to the surface. The “$ Value” button reveals the monetary value of a treasure chest. The “Clear” button allows a player to void a data entry mistake during game play.

== Rules ==
The first player to earn $1,000,000 in Lost Treasure is the winner. Money is earned by selling treasure in one of the 8 ports on the board. The Dive Control randomly assigns treasure locations when it is powered on. Treasure cannot be located on land, but it can be located in a port.

Gameplay proceeds by guessing the location of a gold or silver treasure chest. In order to move, a player must roll the dice. The number rolled with the dice is the number of squares that the player is allowed to move the boat in any direction on the water. Moving overland is not permitted.

Once a player arrives in a sector where he believes a chest is located, he can fill his scuba tanks with air and dive to look for the treasure. The depth of the treasure can impact the players ability to return it to the surface before running out of air.

If the player is able to surface with the treasure, a monetary value is assigned to the chest by the Dive Control. Players must return to port to sell their treasure for money. Any trip carrying treasure can be raided by another player. Raids are conducted by rolling the dice. The player with the higher roll wins the treasure on the opponent's ship, which means that a player who instigates a raid can end up losing all his treasure.
