= Judith Lang Zaimont =

American classical composer

Judith Lang Zaimont (/ˈzeɪmɒnt/; born November 8, 1945) is an American composer and pianist.

== Biography ==
Judith Lang Zaimont was born in Memphis, Tennessee, to a Jewish family. Both Zaimont and her sister, Doris Lang Kosloff, began piano lessons with their mother, Bertha Lang, who was an accomplished pianist and singer. Bertha was very active in the music profession and served as a president of the New York State Music Teachers Association. Judith began lessons at Juilliard at age 12, where she studied piano and theory from 1958-1964. These lessons included piano with Rosina Lhévinne and theory and duo-piano with Ann Hull. Judith and Doris had a successful performance career as duo-pianists that included appearances on Lawrence Welk's and Mitch Miller's television programs and a Carnegie Hall debut in 1963.

Judith's musical ability was observed at an early age. Family members recall her singing in her sleep when she was a child. She also had an incredible ability to play by ear and sight read. She was drawn to the art of composing after performing Chopin. She was not fond of practicing since she did not like to play the same notes over and over. She states, "I like to mess around with the notes." She began her compositional attempts at age eleven and won first place from the National Federation of Music Clubs for a piece written when she was only twelve.

== Education and teaching experiences ==
As Zaimont continued her education, she received a diploma from the Long Island Institute of Music in 1966, a bachelor's degree from Queens College in 1968, and a master's degree in 1978 from Columbia University. She studied composition with Hugo Weisgall and Jack Beeson at Queens College and later studied with Otto Luening while at Columbia. She also traveled to France through a fellowship in order to study orchestration with André Jolivet. She has taught at the Peabody Conservatory of Music, Adelphi University, and the University of Minnesota. She is currently retired.

== Musical style ==
Zaimont's music reflects earlier compositional styles. Much of her music incorporates elements from Romanticism and Impressionism, as well as including 20th-century techniques. Her music is broadly tonal and emphasizes recognizable structure. She prides herself on the ability to have recognizable form and yet still be creative. One of Zaimont's most recognizable compositional characteristics is her use of complex rhythms and sudden meter changes. She writes that rhythm is the most important element giving cohesion to a piece. She obscures the expected arrival of the downbeat, as well as incorporates an increased pulse of the music. She also includes cross rhythms.

Zaimont writes that her melodies are more instrumentally inspired than vocally inspired. This instrumental emphasis includes aspects of asymmetrical lines, octave displacement, as well as a more linear approach. She includes changes of character, dance rhythms, and programmatic titles in several of her works, as her pieces often draw on elements of nature, which is an inspiration for her writing. Zaimont describes her style as "highly dramatic with non-traditional but tonal underpinnings". As Zaimont writes, "My style is essentially chromatic and non-contrapuntal." She also places importance on texture and has a strong ability to write idiomatically for all instruments, which is a result of her strong sense of inner hearing. She was forced to rely on this when an operation for otosclerosis in 1984 left her with hearing loss in her left ear. "When I woke up the next morning, I couldn't hear birds. And I haven't heard them through natural hearing ever since."

== Musical influences ==
Zaimont was influenced by several well-known composers, including Berlioz, Chopin, Scriabin, Prokofiev, Debussy, Ravel, Messiaen, Stravinsky, and Copland. Her main attraction to these composers was their characterizing use of texture, fast harmonic rhythm, and figuration. She states, "I prefer textures where there's a lot of 'stuff'. And since I do write melodies, the textures need to be lucid, with surfaces worked sufficiently to characterize the materials. I've been called a Romantic Modernist, and that's pretty accurate." Her early influence of Gershwin and Jazz can be heard in her earlier works. She also has a love of French music, especially Debussy, as well as music with text. Although one should have composers of influence, Zaimont believes it is very important for a composer to find his or her unique voice.

== Musical impact ==
Judith Lang Zaimont has also done much to draw attention to the challenges of female composers. Although she persistently promotes women composers, she does not like being referred to as a woman composer. "I never heard the term 'adjective-composer' until 1972, when I was on Bob Sherman's radio show in New York, and he asked me what it was like to be a 'woman composer'. There was dead air on the tape right at that spot, because I'd never thought of myself as any kind of adjective composer. I have special observations about being labeled a woman composer, but I keep them to myself."

She has also addressed the absence of women composers in the repertoire of teaching materials. She believes that students are not exposed to female composers, especially living ones, throughout their course of study. She has attempted to urge teachers to include more female composers and new music in their students' college repertoire. Zaimont has made an effort to include herself in this area and has written for several ability levels. She has also served as the head editor of the series The Musical Woman: An International Perspective. These books were published because women composers of the past were being overlooked. Thus, another major accomplishment is her record of publications, which includes the previous series and several other articles.

== Awards ==
- National Federation of Music Clubs, 10 prizes (1962–1970)
- Debussy Fellowship of the Alliance Françoise (1971–1972)
- MacDowell Fellowship (1971 and 1976)
- Guggenheim Fellowship (1983)
- International Alliance for Women in Music Recording Award for Neon Rhythm (1995)
- Honored Composer at the Van Cliburn International Competition (2001)
- Aaron Copland Award (2003)
- Gottschalk Centenary Composition Gold Medal for Man's Image and His Cry (1969)
- National Endowment for the Arts (1982)
- McCollin International Composition Competition First Prize for Symphony no.1 (1995)
- BMI Young Composer Award for Four Songs for Mezzo-Soprano and Piano (1996)
- Artist Fellowship in Music Composition-Bush Foundation (2005)

== Works ==
A complete works list can be found at .
