= Western Atlas =

American oilfield services company

- Predecessors: Western Geophysical; Dresser Atlas
- Founded: 1987; 39 years ago
- Owners: Until 1994: Litton Industries; Dresser Industries

Western Atlas was an oilfield services company formed in 1987 through the merger of Western Geophysical (owned by Litton Industries) and Dresser Atlas. The resulting company was a joint venture of Litton and Dresser Industries until it was spun off as a publicly traded company in 1994.

== Background ==
In 1998, Western Atlas was acquired by Baker Hughes. Western Atlas wireline division, Western Atlas Logging Services, became Baker Atlas, one of seven divisions of Baker Hughes. The Western Geophysical division of Western Atlas was joined with Schlumberger geophysical operations, Geco-Prakla, to form WesternGeco in 2000. WesternGeco was initially owned jointly by Baker Hughes and Schlumberger. In 2006 Schlumberger bought Baker Hughes' interest in WesternGeco.

This company went from Atlas Wireline to Western Atlas then to Baker Atlas.

== See also ==
- List of oilfield service companies
