= Lorenzo Simonelli =

Lorenzo Simonelli may refer to:

- Lorenzo Simonelli (manager) (born 1973), Italian manager
- Lorenzo Simonelli (athlete) (born 2002), Italian athlete
