= Henry Salvatori =

American political activist (1901–1997)

- Born: Ercole Salvatori; March 28, 1901; Tocco da Casauria, Abruzzo, Italy
- Died: July 6, 1997 (aged 96)
- Education: University of Pennsylvania (B.A.), Columbia University (M.A.)
- Known for: Founding Western Geophysical, conservative political activism, philanthropy
- Spouse: Grace Ford
- Scientific career
- Fields: Geophysics, Physics
- Workplaces: Western Geophysical, Geophysical Service Incorporated

Henry Salvatori (March 28, 1901 – July 6, 1997) was an Italian-born American geophysicist, businessman, philanthropist, and political activist.

Salvatori founded Western Geophysical in 1933 and, after selling the company in 1960, pursued a second career as a philanthropist and conservative political activist. He was a long-time financial supporter of The Heritage Foundation and the Claremont Institute, both conservative think tanks.

== Background and business career ==
Salvatori was born in Tocco da Casauria, Abruzzo, Italy, and emigrated with his family to the United States in 1908.

He earned a bachelor's degree from the University of Pennsylvania in 1923 and a master's degree in physics from Columbia University in 1926. In 1930, he joined Geophysical Service Incorporated, but he left in 1933 to found Western Geophysical. Western Geophysical prospered, allowing him to begin a long involvement in philanthropy and conservative political causes. In 1960, he sold Western Geophysical to Litton Industries, allowing him to devote more time to politics.

== Philanthropy and activism ==
Having already been a founding stockholder of National Review magazine in the 1950s, Salvatori pursued a second career as a philanthropist and conservative political activist after selling Western Geophysical in 1960.

In 1962, he convinced the staunchly conservative Joe Shell, Richard M. Nixon's intraparty rival for governor, to endorse Nixon in the general election to promote party unity. Nixon, however, lost to the Democrat Edmund G. "Pat" Brown, Sr. In 1964, Salvatori chaired Barry Goldwater's presidential campaign in California. He convinced Goldwater to allow Ronald Reagan to give a televised fundraising speech entitled "A Time for Choosing", the speech that launched Reagan's political career. Salvatori funded the telecast and recording of Reagan's speech himself, a fact crucial to the speech's eventual airing in support of Goldwater. The candidate's close advisors strongly disapproved of Reagan and the speech.

Later, he was one of Reagan's initial supporters for governor of California, having served as state finance chairman for his 1966 campaign and as part of Reagan's "kitchen cabinet". Salvatori was the campaign director for Sam Yorty during Yorty's 1969 mayoral primary campaign against Tom Bradley.

Salvatori and his wife, the former Grace Ford, also made significant contributions to civic and educational institutions, including the Dorothy Chandler Pavilion, Claremont McKenna College, the University of Southern California, the University of Pennsylvania, Stanford University, Pepperdine University, and Boston University.

In 1969, Salvatori founded The Henry Salvatori Center for the Study of Individual Freedom in the Modern World at Claremont McKenna College. In 1990 he established the Henry Salvatori Foundation, which has, among other acts, endowed a chair (the Henry Salvatori Professorship in American Values and Traditions) at Chapman University. another chair (the "Henry Salvatori Professorship in Law & Community Service") at Chapman University School of Law, currently held by John Eastman. and endowed, in 1996, the Salvatori Prize for American Citizenship, awarded annually by The Heritage Foundation.

== Recognition ==
Salvatori was honoured by the Young America's Foundation, which created the Henry Salvatori Lecture Series in 1991.

== Extended family ==
Salvatori's grandson Ford O'Connell is a Republican political activist, analyst, pundit and writer.
