= HMH =

HMH may refer to:

- Hamilton-Madison House, a settlement house in New York City
- Heineken Music Hall, in Amsterdam, Netherland
- History Meeting House, in Warsaw, Poland
- Holocaust Museum Houston, in Texas, United States
- Houghton Mifflin Harcourt, an American publisher
- Houston Methodist Hospital, part of the Texas Medical Center
- Hackensack Meridian Health, a New Jersey Medical Institution
- Huishui Miao, a language of China
- Huntington Memorial Hospital, in Pasadena, California, United States
- Marine Heavy Helicopter Squadron; see List of active United States Marine Corps aircraft squadrons
- Huber-Mises-Hencky criterion, an alternative name for the von Mises yield criterion
- Hanumangarh, a city in Rajasthan, India
- HMH, a German company
