= Jay Randolph Monroe III =

American businessman

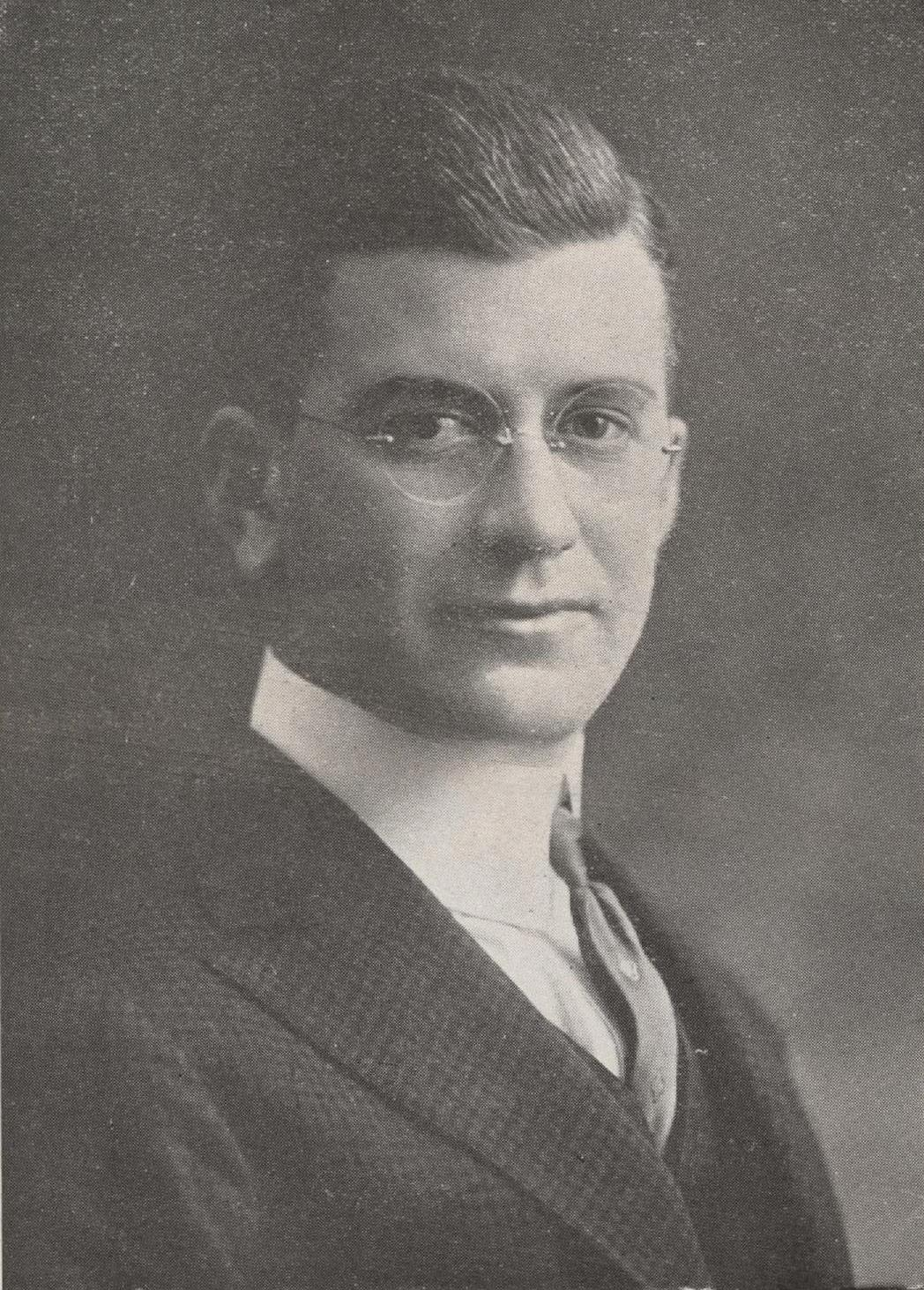
- Born: January 6, 1883; South Haven, Michigan
- Died: April 29, 1937 (aged 54); Orange, New Jersey
- Education: University of Michigan, 1906 (LL.B.)
- Known for: Monroe Calculating Machine Company
- Spouse(s): Bette Belle Baughman (July 25, 1888 – May 12, 1923); Edith House Montgomery (– 1931); Ruby Ethlyn Wheeler (Jun 2 1895 –)
- Children: Jay Randolph Monroe, IV (September 3, 1911 – 1914); Marjorie Belle Monroe (March 28, 1913 –); Malcolm Monroe (April 29, 1917 – November 21, 1988); Marilyn Monroe (–)
- Parents: Lyman Sylvester Monroe (father); Carrie Jane Curtis (mother)

Jay Randolph Monroe III (January 6, 1883 – April 29, 1937) was an American who founded the Monroe Calculating Machine Company in 1912.

== Early life ==
He was born in South Haven, Michigan, January 6, 1883. His father, of Scotch descent, was a Michigan banker. Jay was named after his grandfather, Judge Jay R. Monroe, the founder of the town of South Haven, Michigan, and for his uncle, Jay R. Monroe, Jr., a banker in Kalamazoo, who died at an early age. Jay grew up on the shores of Lake Michigan where he first took an interest in sailing. The son received a thorough classical education in the John B. Stetson University, Florida from 1893 to 1900, Kalamazoo College Preparatory School, Michigan to 1901, Kalamazoo College, Michigan to 1903, and was graduated, LL.B., at the University of Michigan in 1906. He began his business career in the employ of the Western Electric Company of Chicago in 1906 not as a lawyer, but as a clerk.

In 1907 he was transferred to Pittsburgh where he married Bette Belle Baughman on August 22, 1908, and in 1910 he was transferred to the New York office, as general chief clerk.

== Monroe Calculating Machine Company ==
In 1912 he founded the Monroe Calculating Machine Company with Frank Stephen Baldwin, having first purchased Mr. Baldwin's patents. Jay's first cousin, Stephen B. Monroe, and a group of his associates in Kalamazoo, provided the original capital.

Mr. Monroe was also the president of two subsidiaries, the Gardner Company, adding machine manufacturers, and the Defiance Manufacturing Company, check writing machine manufacturers. He was also vice president of the Monroe Realty Company founded by his father, a director of the Maplewood Bank of Maplewood, New Jersey, where he long made his home, president of the Calculator Equipment Corporation, and a director of the Saving Investment and Trust Company of the Oranges in New Jersey.

== Other activities ==
On June 2, 1923, Mr. Monroe incorporated himself as a personal holding corporation in New Jersey. On September 7, 1926, this corporation purchased a house at 6 Halsey Place in South Orange, New Jersey for Mr. Monroe to live in. The house was described as:

...an elaborate structure consisting in addition to servants' quarters, of thirteen rooms including a music room, palm room and sun room. Throughout the house are Tiffany fixtures and leaded casement windows equipped with ultra-violet glass and roll screens. The library, dining room, and music room fireplaces are trimmed with Dutch tile. Installed in the house is a Skinner organ with an echo loft in the attic. The furnishings for the premises were purchased by [the corporation] at an aggregate cost of $48,111.82. The premises include two semi-attached garages for eight cars, a storage building, tea house, tennis court with disappearing backstops, green house, and an elevated putting green.

== Death ==
He died at his home in South Orange, New Jersey on April 29, 1937 of a massive cerebral hemorrhage. In 1958, his widow and son established a modest charitable foundation in his memory so that his generous spirit could be perpetuated.
