= O17 =

O17 may refer to:

- Consolidated O-17 Courier, an observation aircraft of the United States National Guard
- Nevada County Air Park, in California, United States; formerly assigned FAA LID O17
- Oxygen-17, an isotope of oxygen
