= Machlett Laboratories =

American manufacturer of X-ray and vacuum tubes

Machlett Laboratories was a Northeastern United States-based company that manufactured X-ray and high-power vacuum tubes. Machlett was a large producer of the tubes and developed accessories to be used with them as well.

For its contributions to World War II efforts, the US government gave it an "E" award in 1945. The company was bought by Varian in 1989.

== History ==
The company began as E. Machlett and Son, which was founded in 1897 in New York City, United States as scientific glass makers.

=== Early days ===
Machlett Laboratories was created from E. Machlett & Sons in order to exploit the then new technology of X-rays. They made X-ray tubes from the beginning to 1989 when they were bought by Varian. In addition to making X-ray tubes, they manufactured high-power vacuum tubes for use in radio and TV broadcasting (857B mercury-vapor half-wave rectifier tube) and for industrial induction heating. Those two sides of the business were about equivalent for most of the life of the company.

Machlett Laboratories, Inc. was established in 1934 on Hope Street and Camp Avenue Stamford, Connecticut. This manufacturing operation began making X-ray tubes and became the largest producer of its kind in the world. Raymond was president of the company, founded by his father Robert, a scientist who made the first practical X-ray tube in America and devoted his life to making it safe and successful in the field of medicine. Robert Machlett associated with Madame Curie and other leading roentgenologists to make this happen.

They moved to 1063 Hope St. in Stamford, Connecticut, in the early 20th century, and remained there. Among their achievements was a counter made by them for Irene and Frederic Joliot-Curie for use in their experiments on artificial radioactivity in 1934 which is currently contained in the Science Museum in Great Britain. They were given an “E” award by the US government in 1945 for their contribution to the war effort.

In the mid 1940s they had a location at 220 E. 23rd Street, New York 10, N.Y., and were listed as Laboratory Apparatus & Chemicals. A plastic ruler from that time shows the "E" award.

== Products ==
=== Transmitting tubes ===
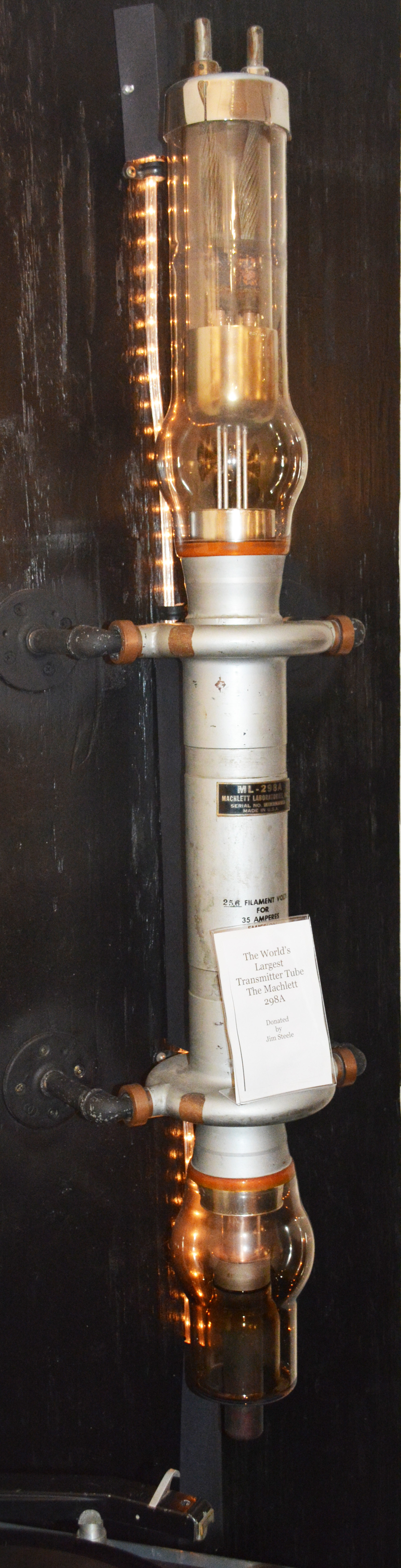
Machlett Labs 298A radio transmission tube, ca. 1958. This was the largest transmission tube made. This one is on display at the Georgia Museum of Radio History in St. Marys, GA, USA.

Machlett was well known for its rather complete line of transmitting tubes, most particularly triodes.

For quite a while, Machlett's 6697s were the most-used Class B modulator tubes (as a push-pull pair) and Class C final tubes (as a single-ended pair) in 50,000-watt plate-modulated AM transmitters.

In a classical Doherty amplifier (a Class B "carrier" tube and a Class C "peak" tube), 50,000 watts could be achieved using only two 6697s, but the drive requirement was about 5,000 watts, so the driver was often a complete 5,000-watt transmitter. The driver power could be "passed through" (i.e., was not dissipated as heat) if the carrier tube was operated with a grounded grid and, as before, the peak tube was operated with a grounded cathode.

Later, chief competitor Eimac released tetrodes which rather quickly eclipsed Machlett's triodes, as tetrodes have higher gain (thereby requiring much lower driver power, usually about 1,000 watts for 50,000 watts out), and do not require "neutralization". And tetrodes can be screen-grid modulated, especially in a Sainton-modified Doherty amplifier, where both the "carrier" and "peak" tubes may be operated in Class C.

6697s were also employed in RCA's upgraded Ampliphase transmitter, the BTA-50H.

CPI's Econco division remanufactures Eimac and Machlett power tubes.

=== X-ray tubes ===
They were the first company to utilize the concept of the rotating anode, something which is just about universal in medical X-ray systems at this date. Towards the end of the time of manufacture, they were producing oil-circulating X-ray tubes with a heat exchanger attached (for use with computed tomography (CT) scanners), with 5-inch diameter rotating anodes formed from tungsten-rhenium alloy and molybdenum, with a large mass of graphite attached to act as a heat sink. Smaller tubes without graphite heat sinks had highly radiative coatings to disperse the generated heat into the oil surrounding the tube itself.

The manufacture of X-ray tubes was licensed to two other companies, GEC Medical and Comet SA of Bern in Switzerland.

==== Machlett X-ray tube ====
The Machlett X-ray tube was produced to ‘provide electrostatic protection for the filament (cathode) so as to permit long life to be achieved at operating voltages in the range 100-300 kV’ i . The X-ray tube was designed and manufactured by E. Machlett & Son who were specialists in scientific glass instruments. The American company, which was established in New York 1897, began as a single shop and soon grew into an internationally recognized firm. The Machlett X-ray tube was patented in April 1934; one of its tubes, at the University of Melbourne's School of Physics, is from 1937. These X-ray tubes may have been used by Professor T.H Laby's X-ray group, which was a priority research topic there. This interest was sparked by the appointment in 1889 of Professor T. R. Lyle. Lyle, who was head of the school until 1915, is thought to have been the first person in Australia to have taken an X-ray photograph iii. A photocopy of this photograph can be found in the School of Physics Archive. For this particular experiment, Lyle actually made his own x-ray tube. His successor, Laby, continued to work with X-rays. During the 1920s he worked on the X-ray spectra of atoms and in 1930 he, along with Dr C. E. Eddy, published Quantitative Analysis by X-Ray Spectroscopy iv . Also with Eddy Laby produced the paper "Sensitivity of Atomic Analysis by X-rays". Laby went on to have an X-ray spectrograph of his own design manufactured by Adam Hilger Ltd.

=== Accessories ===
As well as X-ray tubes, they manufactured collimators – to define the beam size – and three marks of “Dynalyser” – an invasive instrument for measuring all the important parameters in an X-ray tube. This consisted of an HV unit insulated with SF_{6}, and an indicating unit. A separate radiation monitor could be used with this, and an oscilloscope could also be attached to this device if desired. Some 2,500 of the most recent version were sold, and this device survived the sale of the company to Varian and later buyers, being in production from the early 1980s to around 1995.

There were three generations of the Dynalyzer produced. Maintenance on the Dynalyzer is available by its inventor, Dr. Jon Shapiro, at http://giciman.com
