= Western Geophysical =

American oil exploration company

- Founded: 1933; 93 years ago in California
- Founder: Henry Salvatori
- Defunct: 2000
- Fate: Absorbed into WesternGeco
- Parent: Litton Industries (1960-1987); Western Atlas (1987-1998); Baker Hughes (1998-2000)

Western Geophysical was an international oil exploration company founded in California in 1933 by Henry Salvatori for the purpose of using reflection seismology to explore for petroleum.

The company prospered and was sold by Salvatori to Litton Industries in 1960. In 1987, Litton and Dresser Industries formed a joint venture comprising Western and Dresser Atlas. The joint venture, Western Atlas, was spun off as a public company in 1994. Western then purchased Halliburton Geophysical Services, which had been formed from Geophysical Service Incorporated, Geosource and several other companies. In 1998, Western Atlas was acquired by Baker Hughes. In 2000, Western Geophysical became part of a joint venture between Baker Hughes and Schlumberger called WesternGeco and ceased to exist as a separate entity. In May 2006, Schlumberger bought Baker Hughes' 30% share of the company.

Western Geophysical built a number of significant seismic survey vessels over the years, in different classes depending on the role. The majority of Western Geophysical vessels were named for geographic features, such as:

- Western Anchorage (200', West Coast and Alaska)
- Western Cape (small, Gulf of Mexico)
- Western Cay (small, Gulf of Mexico)
- Western Glacier (200', West Coast and Alaska)

R/V Western Viking, Seismic Survey vessel, registered Panama, surveyed Hibernia 1983-84, from Harbour Grace, St. John's, Halifax.

- The Western Endeavour was based out of Singapore in the mid-70's. She worked from as far away as Mauritius to the Solomon Islands. Photo taken in Pt. Moresby, Papua New Guinea, late 1974. She was 127', 400 tons, V-hull. (can't figure out how to publish the photo). They also had the Western Islander and the Oil Creek (a supply vessel), both in S.E. Asia at that time.

During the 1970s Western Geophysical had one of its vessels searching for oil in the Persian Gulf - using their seismic technology. They had an office (a base in a house) in Manama, Bahrain where they were in radio contact with the vessel. More recent vessels including the Western Trident and Western Neptune passed to WesternGeco when the new company was formed. Another seismic vessel was the R/V Western Viking, registered in Panama, surveyed Hibernia and Sable Island The company was often referred to as "Westerns" and was affectionately known over many years by many of its employees as the "circus without a tent".

Dean Walling was the operating President of Western Geophysical for his entire working life and retired when the company was sold to Litton Industries in 1960.

== See also ==
- List of oilfield service companies
