= Monroe Systems for Business =

American company

- Industry: Electronics
- Founded: 1912
- Founder: Jay Randolph Monroe III
- Headquarters: USA
- Products: electric calculators, printers, and office accessories

Monroe Systems for Business is an American privately owned corporation devoted to electric calculators, printers, and office accessories such as paper shredders to business clients. Originally known as the Monroe Calculating Machine Company, it was founded in 1912 by Jay Randolph Monroe as a maker of adding machines and calculators based on a machine designed by Frank Stephen Baldwin. It was later known as Monroe THE Calculator Company, and Monroe Division of Litton Industries.

== History ==
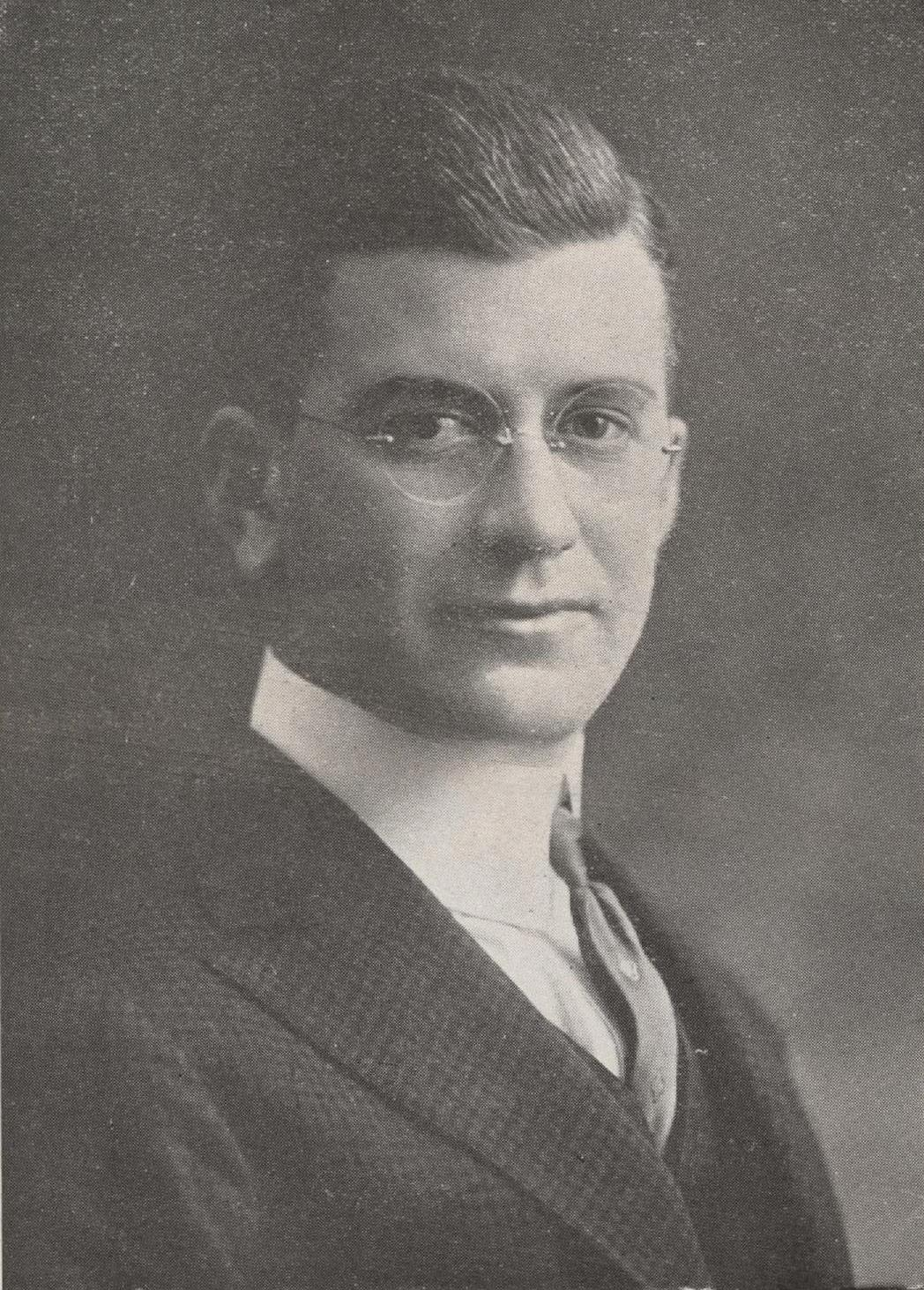
Portrait of Jay Randolph Monroe

In 1911, Jay Randolph Monroe first saw the Baldwin Calculator, the invention of Frank Stephen Baldwin. Although Mr. Baldwin's machine had been patented in 1874 and had been judged by the Franklin Institute as the most noteworthy invention of that year winning the John Scott Medal, it had not been developed for commercial use. Mr. Monroe recognized the merits of the Baldwin Calculator, and in April 1912 he organized the Monroe Calculating Machine Company, and in a small rented room near Newark, New Jersey, the manufacture of the first Monroe Adding-Calculator was begun.

The following year the firm moved to Orange, New Jersey. The factory personnel consisted of only nine men and the entire heavy factory equipment was a lathe and two small presses. Even with these meager tools, tolerances were maintained to within thousandths of an inch to insure the accurate performance of the finished machine. The first Monroe was offered to the business world in 1914.

In 1932, the company was awarded the Franklin Institute's John Price Wetherill Medal.

For many years, Monroe was headquartered in Orange, New Jersey and Morris Plains, New Jersey with its manufacturing plants in New Jersey, Bristol, Virginia and Amsterdam. In 1958, the company was acquired by Litton Industries. Monroe also sold product overseas, advertising, (e.g.) ‘the world’s first really low-cost electronic computer’ (£12,500-Monrobot, 1962) in the UK from offices at Bush House, London. Litton sold Monroe via a Leveraged buyout to a group of private investors in 1984. In the mid-1980s, the company diversified and began carrying a line of private-labeled copiers (manufactured by Mita Corp.) and cross-cut paper shredders, but those items have been discontinued.

In the 1970s and 1980s, the company had some 300 sales and service branch offices in the United States. In 1972, Monroe announced a pocket-sized electronic display calculator at $269. As low-cost electronic calculators from Japan became readily available through retail distribution, the mechanical calculator companies like Monroe, Friden, and Marchant declined even as they introduced programmable calculators.

In 1980, the company name was changed to "Monroe Systems for Business". This change in name was to reflect the diversification of the company from a calculator-only company to one which addressed the broader needs of the office. During this period, Monroe introduced bookkeeping machines, magnetic stripe ledger card accounting machines, programmable calculators, computers, copiers, facsimile and shredders.

Since 2016, Monroe Systems for Business has been owned by Arlington Industries. Bill Ault serves as chief operating officer.

In 2019, Monroe acquired Typewriters.com, a typewriter supplier. It also began selling accounting products. Also in 2019, Monroe became an Amazon channel partner.

== Products ==
=== Mechanical and electromechanical calculators ===
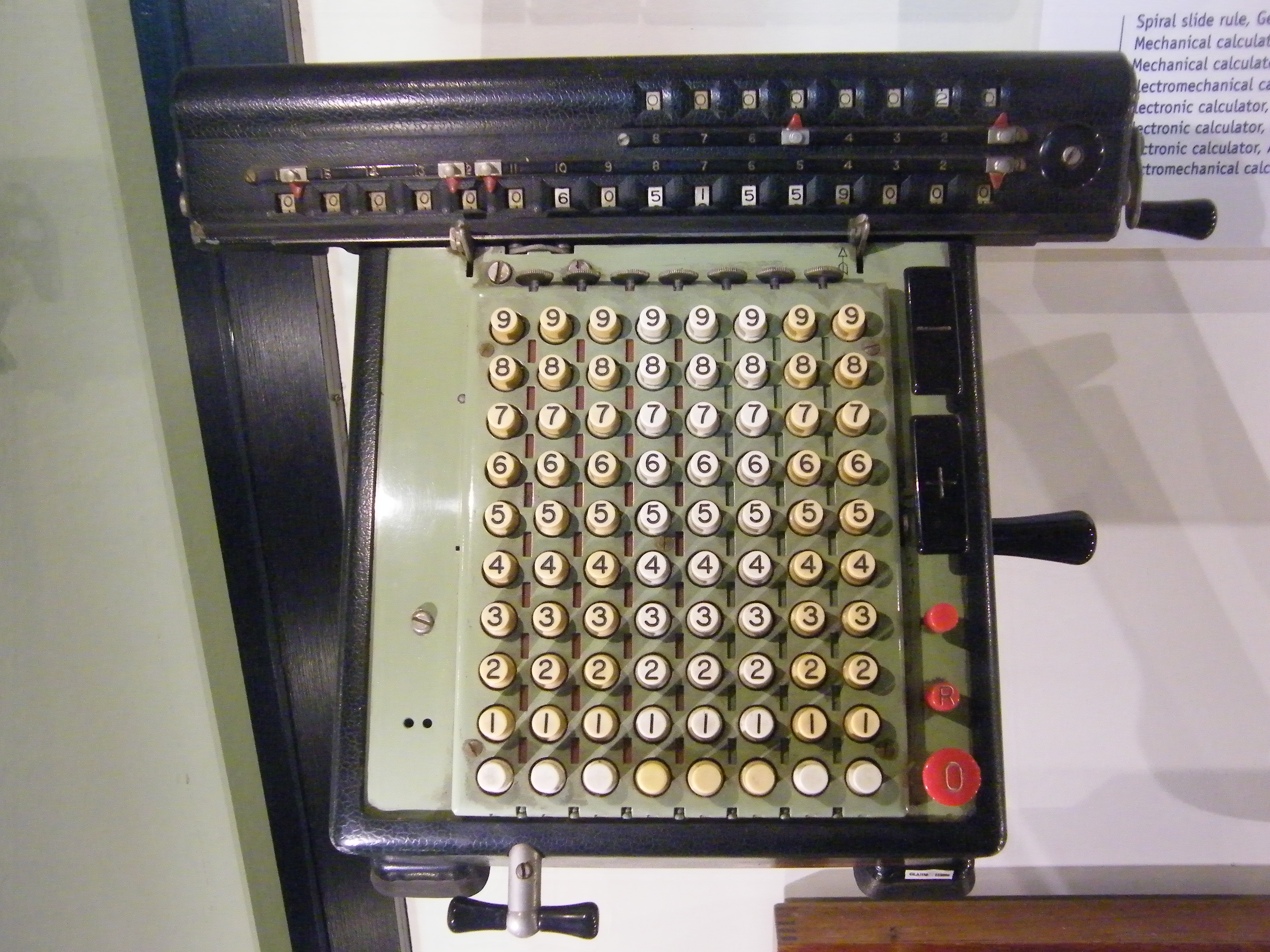
Monroe L-160

Early models of calculator were designated by letters. The letters A, B, and C are lost in the records of those early days devoted to constructing a suitable pilot model. The "D" model started manufacture in 1915 with serial numbers below 4,000. The "E" model started manufacture in 1916 with serial numbers beginning at 4,000. The "F" model was introduced in 1917 with serial numbers above 6,000. The "G" model was the first machine of the refined style, and was introduced in 1919 with serial numbers above 20,000. The "H" and "I" were never released for production. The "K" was the real start of the big forward march by the Monroe Company. The "K" hand machine, introduced in 1921, was followed by KA, KAS, KAA, KASC, KASE, etc., machines all more fully automatic than the former. The "L" model was produced from January 1929 to February 1971. The "M" model further refined the "L".

- Electromechanical models; rotary calculator display models and printing models

Model 145 was the last adding machine model produced.
Model 570 was the last electro-mechanical four-function calculator model produced.

=== Electronic calculators ===
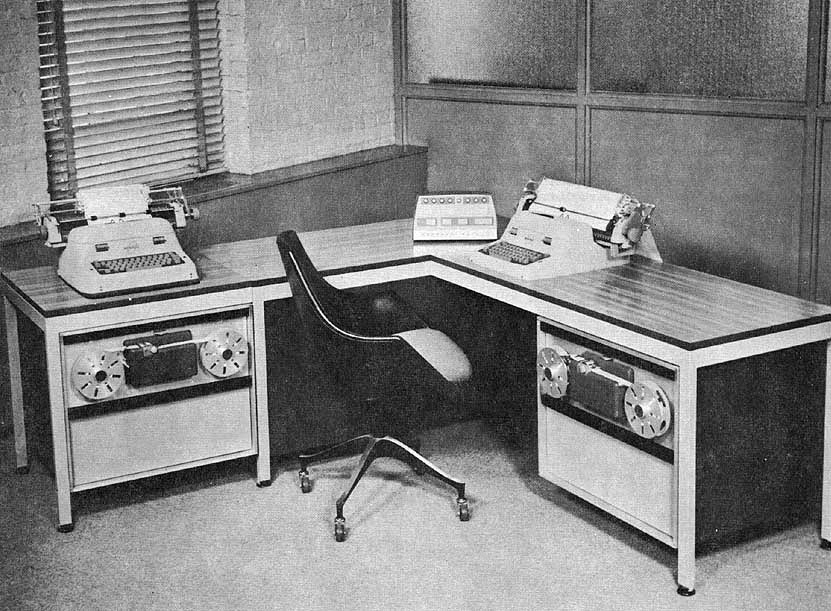
Monrobot XI

- Electronic calculator models:
  - Visual Display only
    - 400 and 600 series
  - Paper tape and visual display
    - 1300 and 1400 series
- Programmable models:
  - The 1600 and 1800 series calculators, from OEM Compucorp competed against similar desktop calculators from Wang Laboratories.
  - Model 200 billing machine for accounts receivable functions.
  - Monrobot III – general-purpose computer, public debut in 1952 on the TV broadcast of the national election results over the NBC network.
  - Monrobot V – portable, general-purpose, used by military for surveying and mapmaking, 1955
  - Monroe Calculating Machine Mark XI (or "Monrobot XI") was an inexpensive, relatively slow, general-purpose computer introduced in 1960

As of 2019, Monroe Systems for Business sells Medium-Duty, Heavy-Duty and Handheld calculators.
