= Bird Machine Company =

Bird Machine Company was a company founded in the early 1900s making machines for paper making and then developing into other types of equipment. Bird Machine Company was acquired by Baker Hughes, Incorporated in 1989.

== Origin ==
Bird Machine Company can trace its origin to a partnership established by Charles Sumner Bird in the early 1900s. The first product, the BIRD Rotary Paper Screen, was a major contribution in the advancement for stock cleaning in paper mills. The company was incorporated in 1909. Bird soon expanded to a broad line of equipment for stock preparation and cleaning in the pulp and paper industry, as well as significant accessory equipment used in the making and finishing of paper and paperboard.

The company established a broad line of centrifugal and filtration equipment for liquid/solids separation in 1932. The significant development was the patented design of the first planetary gear unit applied to centrifugal equipment. This patent was issued in June, 1934 and formed the foundation for the design utilized in the BIRD Solid Bowl and Screen Bowl Centrifuges and paved the way for the development and application of decanter centrifuges into the process industry.

In the early 1940s, Frank Young of Bird Machine Company patented the BIRD-Young Filter. This fast, efficient filter quickly found applications in the chemical and pharmaceutical markets. The BIRD-Young Filter can efficiently separate and wash solids in a machine that is a fraction of the size of conventional Rotary vacuum-drum filter.

In 1964, the company launched a major program of plant and facilities expansion at South Walpole, Massachusetts, USA headquarters. This policy of providing new facilities and equipment has continued. Today, this headquarters facility includes a complete analytical and pilot scale laboratory, a customer and employee training complex, offices and manufacturing. The 300,000-square-foot (28,000 m^{2}) manufacturing complex includes CNC machine tools, fabrication, assembly and test resources.

In 1965, Bird Machine Company of Canada, Limited, a wholly owned subsidiary of Bird Machine Company, was activated in Montreal. As the Canadian operation grew, the Company expanded further by relocating the manufacturing plant to Saskatoon in 1967.

During the 1970s, Bird initiated an aggressive program of providing local sales, service and manufacturing to support its customers.

The Bird Companies Charitable Foundation was a supporter of Northeastern University and a plaque honoring them for their contributions can be found in Dodge Hall on the main Boston campus.

== Purchase ==
In 1989, Bird Machine Company was acquired by Baker Hughes, Incorporated, a diversified oil field services company based in Houston, Texas.

In 1996, Ketema Process Equipment Company of Santee, California was purchased by Baker Hughes and merged into Bird Machine Company. The acquisition of Ketema provided Bird with an entrée into the pharmaceutical and fine chemical market segments with batch products such as the TOLHURST and MARK III Centrifuges, PROCESS 2000 Vertical Peeler Centrifuge, and NIAGARA and MAVADISC Filters. On July 7, 1997, Baker Hughes, Incorporated announced the completion of the acquisition of the Environmental Technology Division of Deutz AG that consisted of the KHD (today Deutz AG) centrifuge, filtration and thermal product line located in Cologne, Germany, and the R&B filter press operation based in Wuppertal. Although the product lines of Bird and KHD were similar (KHD was a former licensee of Bird), this acquisition provided Bird with a significant market share in the worldwide municipal market, a much stronger presence in Europe and Southern Africa as well as the premier filter press product line. Shortly after the acquisition, the R&B operation was relocated to Cologne.

In October 1998, Bird Machine Company combined resources with two other Baker Hughes companies to form Baker Process. In June 2001, Baker Process was realigned into the three former legacy companies.

In October 2003, Bird Machine was acquired by Andritz AG.
