= Geco (Geophysical Company of Norway) =

Geophysical service company

Geophysical Company of Norway
- Company type: Public
- Industry: Oil and gas
- Founded: 1972; 54 years ago
- Founder: Anders Farestveit
- Defunct: 1993; 33 years ago
- Fate: Merged with Merlin Geophysical, Prakla-Seismos and others
- Successor: Geco-Prakla; WesternGeco
- Area served: Petroleum exploration
- Services: Seismic data acquisitions Seismic data processing Seismic data interpretation Well logging
- Parent: Kongsberg Våpenfabrikk; Det Norske Veritas

Geco (Geophysical Company of Norway) was a European geophysical service company specializing in seismic surveys for petroleum exploration. Starting operating in the North Sea from 1972, the company expanded to operate in most marine areas open for explorations, until Geco was incorporated into Geco-Prakla, with Schlumberger Limited as the solely owner from 1993.

== History ==
The company started as Geoteam-Computas Ltd. A.S on December 13, 1972. The name was shortly afterwards changed to Geophysical Company of Norway, most commonly referred to as Geco. Anders Farestveit was the founder and the first CEO. The main focus was marine seismic surveys, including developing and equipping seismic vessels and conducting seismic surveys on customer requests. Geco was merged with the competing Norwegian geophysical company at that time, Statex (owned by Statoil and Kongsberg Våpenfabrikk) effective from January 1, 1978. Ownership after the merger was shared between Kongsberg Våpenfabrikk and Det Norske Veritas.

Geco retained its identity and name, but extended its service portfolio and global market share from 1978. Besides seismic surveys, the company offered data processing services and interpretation services. The company was spending its earnings in the area of technology research and development. They succeeded in offering a first commercial available 3D seismic interpretation workstation, "Charisma" software, from 1983. Development of a first digital streamer cable, named "Nessie", was completed and in operation from 1984.

The company enjoyed strong expansion until 1985, when there was a global crisis in the oil industry. In the summer of 1986 Schlumberger Limited purchased first 50%, then in 1988 the entire company. This brought about a merger with Merlin Geophysical (Seismic Profilers), who had been purchased by Schlumberger a year earlier.

Mergers with other geophysical companies followed, including Delft Geophysical, Prakla-Seismos (founded in 1963 by merger of Seismos GmbH (founded 1921) and Gesellschaft für Praktische Lagerstättenforschung (Prakla) GmbH (founded 1937)) and Seismograph Services Ltd (owned at the time by Raytheon and based in Holwood Park, Keston, Kent, UK). Following the merger with Prakla-Seismos in 1993, the company was renamed Geco-Prakla. In 2001, Geco-Prakla was joined with the Western Geophysical division of Baker Hughes in a joint venture named WesternGeco. Schlumberger retained 70% ownership in the venture; Baker Hughes owned the remaining 30%.

In April 2006 Schlumberger acquired the 30% interest from Baker Hughes for $2.4 billion.

Now, this company doesn't exist anymore. All of its assets, employees, and legal identities belong to Schlumberger.
