= Milchem =

Milchem Inc. was formed in 1963 to manufacture and market drilling fluids and oilfield chemicals. The company's home office was located at 3920 Essex Lane in Houston, Texas. It had regional sales and service offices throughout North America and the world.

== Background ==
In 1971, Milchem was acquired by Baker Oil Tools.

In 1985, Baker announced that it would combine its Houston-based Milchem Drilling Fluids subsidiary with competitor New Orleans–based Newpark Drilling Fluids forming Milpark, with Baker getting 64% of the merged company and Newpark Resources Inc. parent of Newpark Drilling Fluids taking 36%. Combined revenues at the time of the merger were estimated at $225 million per year.

In 1987, Baker merged with Hughes forming Baker Hughes and Hughes Drilling Fluids was merged into Milpark.

In 1993, Milpark became a product line within Baker Hughes INTEQ.

In 2004, Baker Hughes Drilling Fluids was established as a stand-alone division of Baker Hughes.
