= Charles Litton Sr. =

American engineer and inventor

- Born: March 13, 1904; San Francisco, California
- Died: November 1972 (aged 68); Carson City, Nevada
- Education: Stanford University
- Occupations: Engineer, inventor
- Children: Charles Jr., Larry, Alice
- Parent(s): Charles A. Litton; Alice J. Vincent

Charles Vincent Litton Sr. (1904–1972) was an engineer and inventor from the area now known as Silicon Valley.

== Biography ==
=== Early life ===
Charles Vincent Litton was born on March 13, 1904, in San Francisco, California. His mother was Alice J. Vincent and father was Charles A. Litton. As a boy he experimented with radio technology at his parents' house in Redwood City, California.

Litton was both vocationally trained as a machinist and completed the college preparatory course route at Lick-Wilmerding of San Francisco. He then attended Stanford University, where he graduated with an A.B. in mechanical engineering in 1924 and electrical engineering in 1925.

=== Career ===
In the 1920s, he experimented with new techniques and materials for building vacuum tubes. For example, he built the first practical glass blowing lathe. He worked for Bell Telephone Laboratories in 1925 through 1927, and moved back to California in 1927.

Amateur radio enthusiasts sought vacuum tubes that would perform better than those then available from RCA, Western Electric, General Electric, and Westinghouse, and the San Francisco Bay area was one of the early centers of amateur radio activity and experimentation, containing about 10% of the total operators in the US. Litton joined fellow amateur radio operators William Eitel and Jack McCullough at their vacuum tube manufacturing company located in the Bay area to address amateur needs. There, Litton originated glass lathe techniques which made mass production of reliable high quality power tubes possible, and resulted in the award of wartime contracts to the company. Eitel and McCullough's company, Eitel-McCullough, was headquartered in San Bruno and manufactured power-grid tubes for radio amateurs and aircraft radio equipment.

He later went to work for the Federal Telegraph Company, and headed tube engineering there. Cecil Howard Green (later the founder of Texas Instruments) worked for Litton during that time. During the Great Depression, the Federal was acquired and moved its facilities to New Jersey. Litton stayed in California.

In 1932, he founded Litton Engineering Laboratories with his savings, and continued to experiment in the shop on his parents' Redwood City property. He held 65 patents on various high-tech innovations. Some of these patents resulted in notable litigation. At Frederick Terman's request, Litton helped Stanford build a tube research lab, and recruit David Packard.

During World War II, Litton participated in the design and production of microwave tubes used in communications and radar equipment, for which he was awarded the Presidential Certificate of Merit. In 1941 he formed a partnership called Industrial and Commercial Electronics with Philip Scofield and Ralph Shermund. Russell and Sigurd Varian used Litton klystron tube-making equipment in their family firm, Varian Associates. Another firm (later called Eimac) founded by fellow amateur radio operators William Eitel and Jack McCullough used Litton technology.

After the war, Litton Industries was incorporated in 1947 to manufacture vacuum tubes and the machinery used to produce them. The company grew rapidly, soon rivaling established electronics firms in the east. On August 3, 1952, Litton split off the glass lathe products, which became the sole proprietorship Litton Engineering Laboratories on May 1, 1953. On November 4, 1953, he sold the vacuum tube manufacturing portion of the company to Electro Dynamics Corporation, which had been founded by Charles Bates "Tex" Thornton. In 1954, Electro Dynamics bought the rights to the name Litton Industries. It grew to a multi-national conglomerate. Also in 1954, Litton moved the machinery manufacturing division into a new facility in Grass Valley, California. Litton convinced friend Dr. Donald Hare to move to Grass Valley, and Hare's company became the Grass Valley Group.

=== Death and legacy ===
He died in November 1972 in Carson City, Nevada. His papers are in the collection of The Bancroft Library. His sons Charles Jr. and Larry carried on the business of producing glassworking lathes under the "Litton Engineering Laboratories" name in Grass Valley. He also had five grand children.

Litton was a leader in developing the Nevada County Airpark, and the Sierra Nevada Memorial Hospital.
