= WesternGeco =

London-based geophysical services company

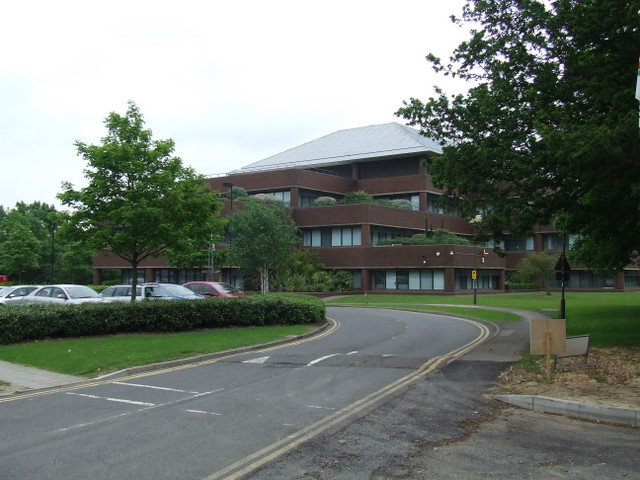
- Schlumberger House, the head office of WesternGeco at London Gatwick Airport
- Type: Subsidiary
- Industry: Energy equipment and services
- Founded: 1933 (in 2000, company took on current name)
- Headquarters: London Gatwick Airport; Crawley, West Sussex, UK
- Key people: Maurice Nessim, President
- Products: Seismic data acquisition, data processing and electromagnetics
- Parent: Schlumberger
- Website: www.slb.com/companies/westerngeco

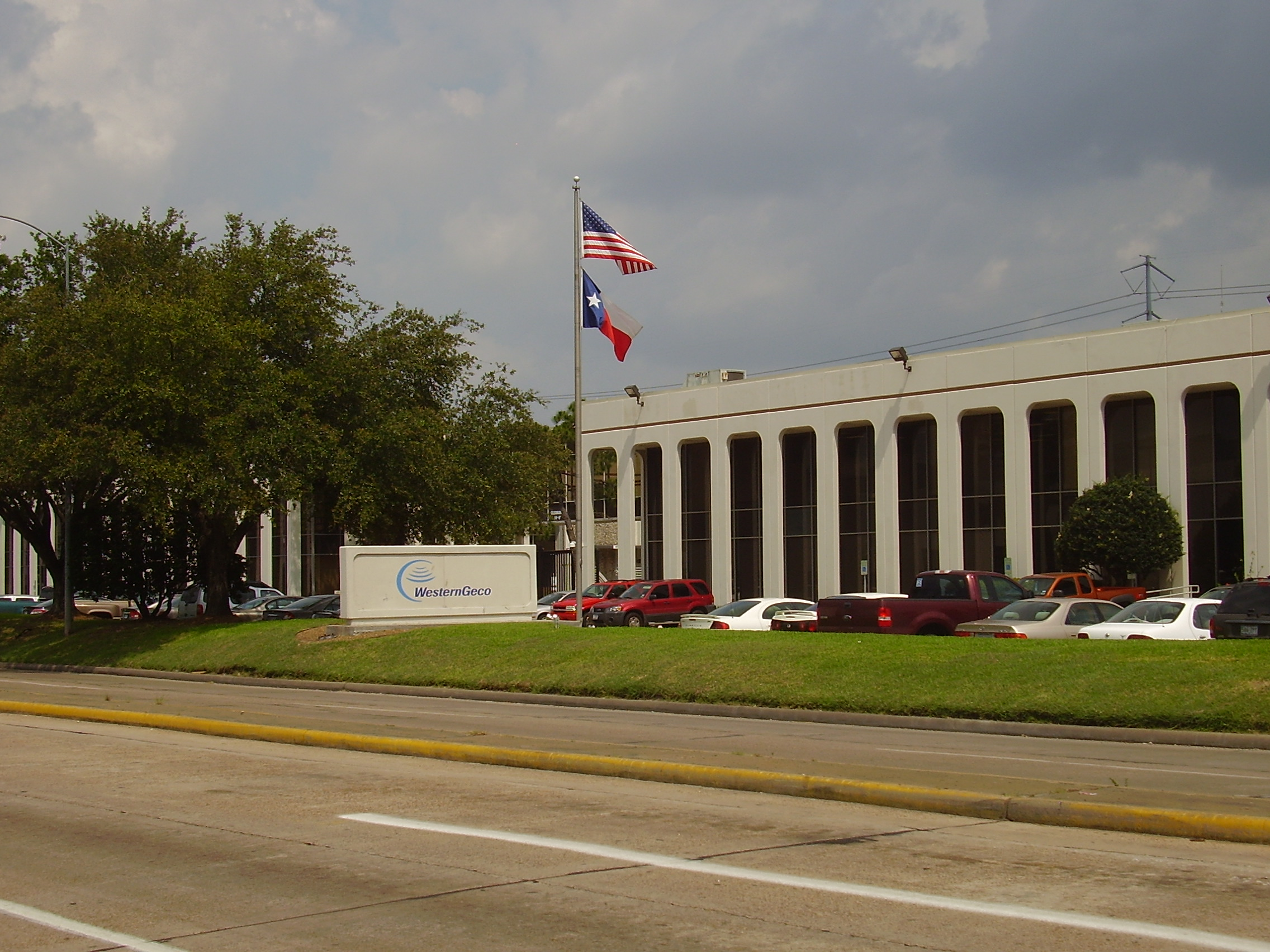
WesternGeco offices in Westchase, Houston, Texas, U.S.

WesternGeco is a geophysical services company. It is headquartered in Schlumberger House on the property of London Gatwick Airport in Crawley, West Sussex.

== Background ==
The company provides reservoir imaging, monitoring, and development services. The company, a business segment of Schlumberger, offers 3D and time-lapse seismic surveys, electromagnetic surveys, and multicomponent surveys for delineating prospects and reservoir management. It also provides geophysical, land and transition-zone acquisition, marine acquisition, electromagnetics, and data processing and reservoir seismic services.

The company was formed by the merger in 2000 of two of the world's largest seismic contractors, Western Geophysical (founded in 1933) and Geco-Prakla. Schlumberger, owners of Geco-Prakla paid cash to Baker Hughes, which then owned Western, for a 70% stake in a joint venture of the combined companies. In May 2006, Schlumberger bought out Baker Hughes' 30% stake for a reported $2.4 billion, making WesternGeco one of its subsidiaries.

== Exit seismic data acquisition ==
In January 2018, Schlumberger CEO Paal Kibsgaard announced that Schlumberger would be exiting the seismic data acquisition business, both onshore and offshore, while retaining its multiclient data processing and interpretation segments. This decision followed the bankruptcy filings of several competitors in the seismic services sector.

In August 2018, the seismic data acquisition business was sold to Shearwater GeoServices.

== Head office ==
WesternGeco had its head office and its Europe/African offices in the Schlumberger House, a 124,000-square-foot (11,500 m^{2}) building on the grounds of Gatwick Airport in Crawley, England. The building was vacated in 2022 and remaining operations moved to the nearby Manor Royal industrial park.
