= HMH (company) =

HMH Holding
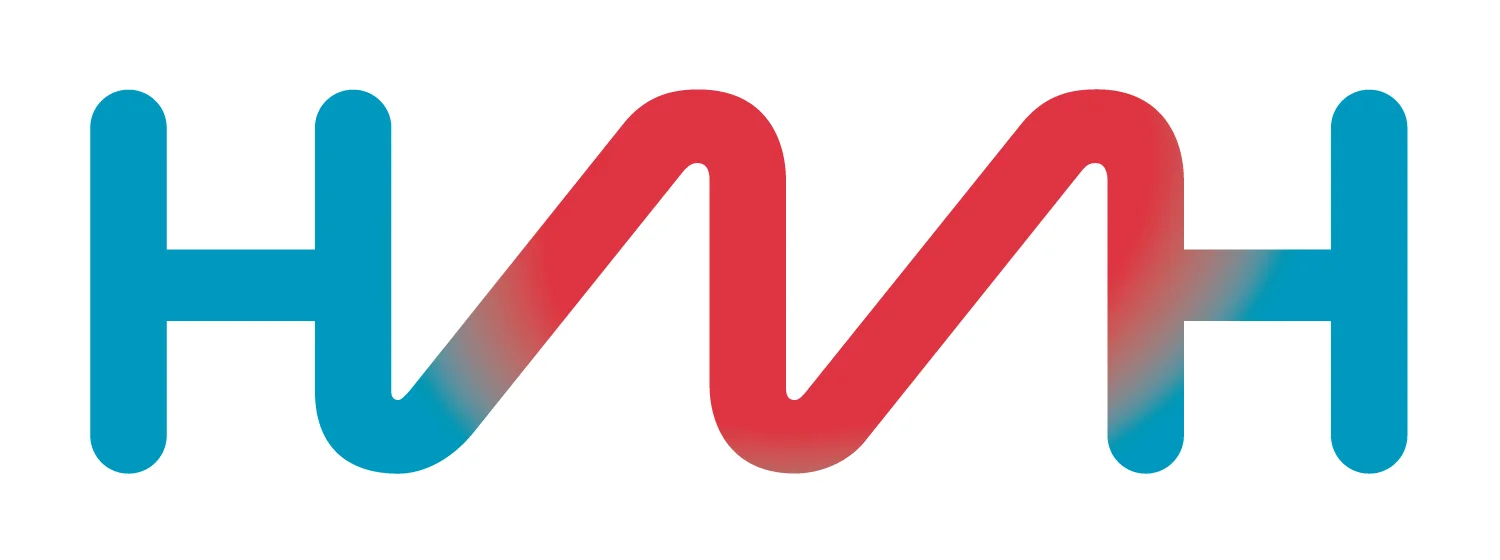
- HMH logo

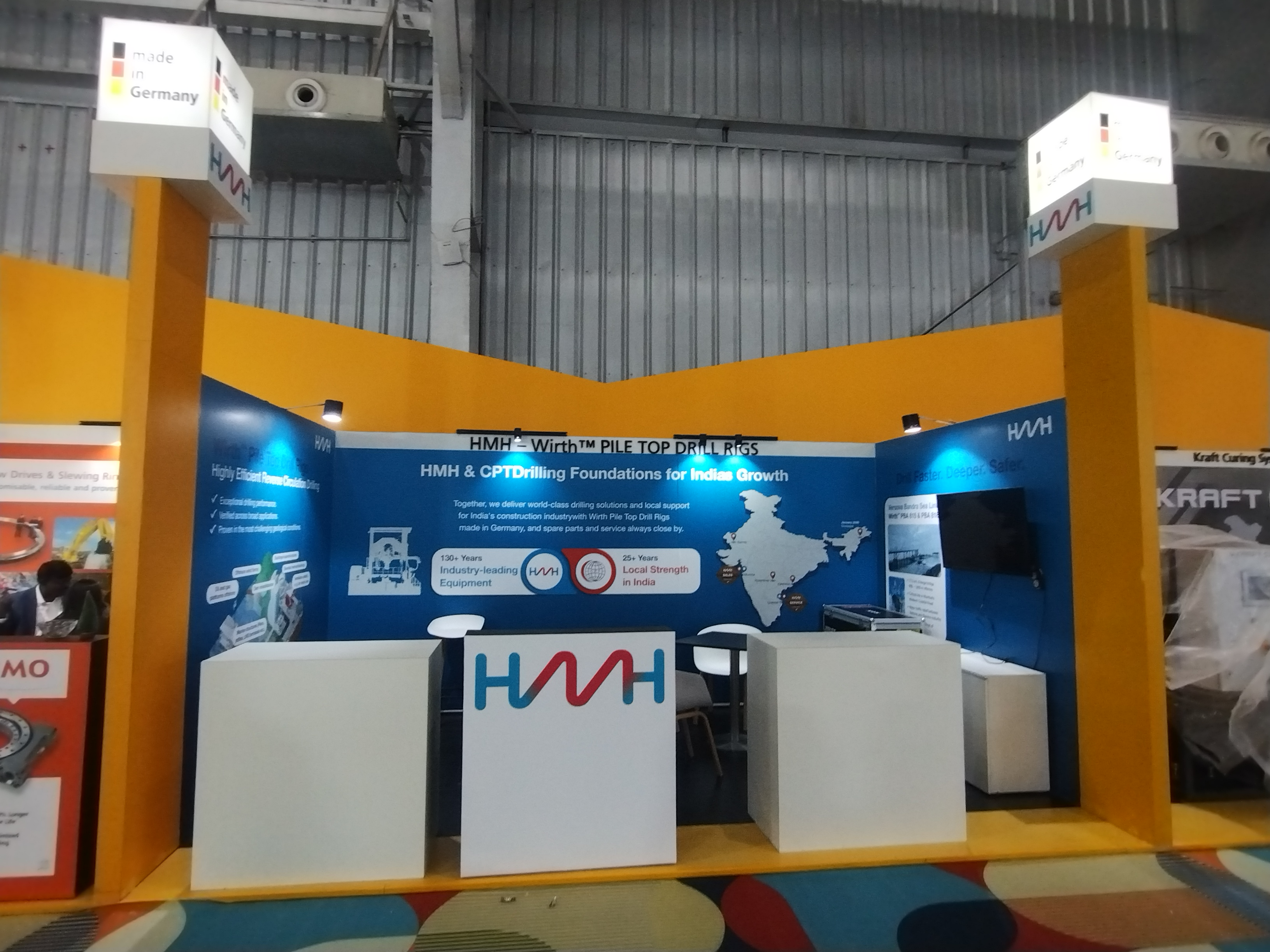
- HMH at EXCON 2025, BIEC
- Trade name: HMH Holding B.V.
- Company type: B.V.
- Industry: Manufacturing
- Genre: Drilling solutions provider
- Founded: October 2021 in Germany
- Headquarters: Amsterdam, The Netherlands
- Area served: Five continents
- Key people: Eirik Bergsvik (CEO)
- Services: Drilling Equipment; Drilling Lifecycle Services; Drilling Digitalization; Drilling Automation; Training; Mining Equipment; Construction Equipment; Manufacturing
- Number of employees: 2,000
- Parent: Baker Hughes (50%); Akastor (50%)
- Website: hmhw.com

HMH Holding B.V. is German worldwide manufacturing company providing drilling solutions.

== History ==
Through the merger of Baker Hughes’ Subsea and Surface Drilling Systems business and Akastor ASA's wholly owned subsidiary MHWirth AS, HMH was established in October 2021.

Wirth, founded in 1895 was the first HMH legacy company.
