= Eimac =

Producer of power vacuum tubes for radio frequency applications

Eimac is a trade mark of Eimac Products, part of the Microwave Power Products Division of Communications & Power Industries. It produces power vacuum tubes for radio frequency applications such as broadcast and radar transmitters. The company name is an initialism from the names of the founders, William Eitel and Jack McCullough.

== History ==
The San Francisco Bay area was one of the early centers of amateur radio activity and experimentation, containing about 10% of the total operators in the US. Amateur radio enthusiasts sought vacuum tubes that would perform at higher power and on higher frequencies than those then available from RCA, Western Electric, General Electric, and Westinghouse. Additionally, they required tubes that would operate with the limited voltages available from typical amateur power supplies.

While employed by the small San Francisco, California manufacturing firm of Heintz & Kaufman which manufactured custom radio equipment, Bill Eitel (amateur radio call sign W6UF) and Jack McCullough (W6CHE) convinced company president Ralph Heintz (W6XBB) to allow them to develop a transmitting tube that could operate at lower voltages than those then available to the amateur radio market, such as the RCA UV-204A or the 852. Their effort was a success and resulted in production of the HK-354. Shortly after in 1934, Eitel and McCullough left H&K to form Eitel McCullough Corp. in San Bruno, California.

The first product produced under the trade mark "Eimac" was the 150T power triode. Later tubes include the 3CX5000A7 power triode and the 4X150D tetrode. The new company thrived during World War II by selling tubes to the U.S. military for use in radar equipment. Charles Litton Sr. originated glass lathe techniques which made mass production of reliable high quality power tubes possible, and resulted in the award of wartime contracts to the company.

=== Mass production ===
Contracts to provide transmission tubes for radar and other radio equipment during World War II required adaption of mass production, research to improve the reliability of tubes, and development of standardized manufacturing techniques which could be performed by unskilled workers. The workforce expanded from a few hundred to several thousand. During the war Eimac produced hundreds of thousands of radar tubes.

=== Welfare capitalism ===
A union organizing drive in 1939-40 by the strong Bay area labor movement was fought off by adoption of a strategy of welfare capitalism which included pensions and other generous benefits, profit sharing, and such extras as a medical clinic and a cafeteria. An atmosphere of cooperation and collaboration was established,

=== Postwar ===
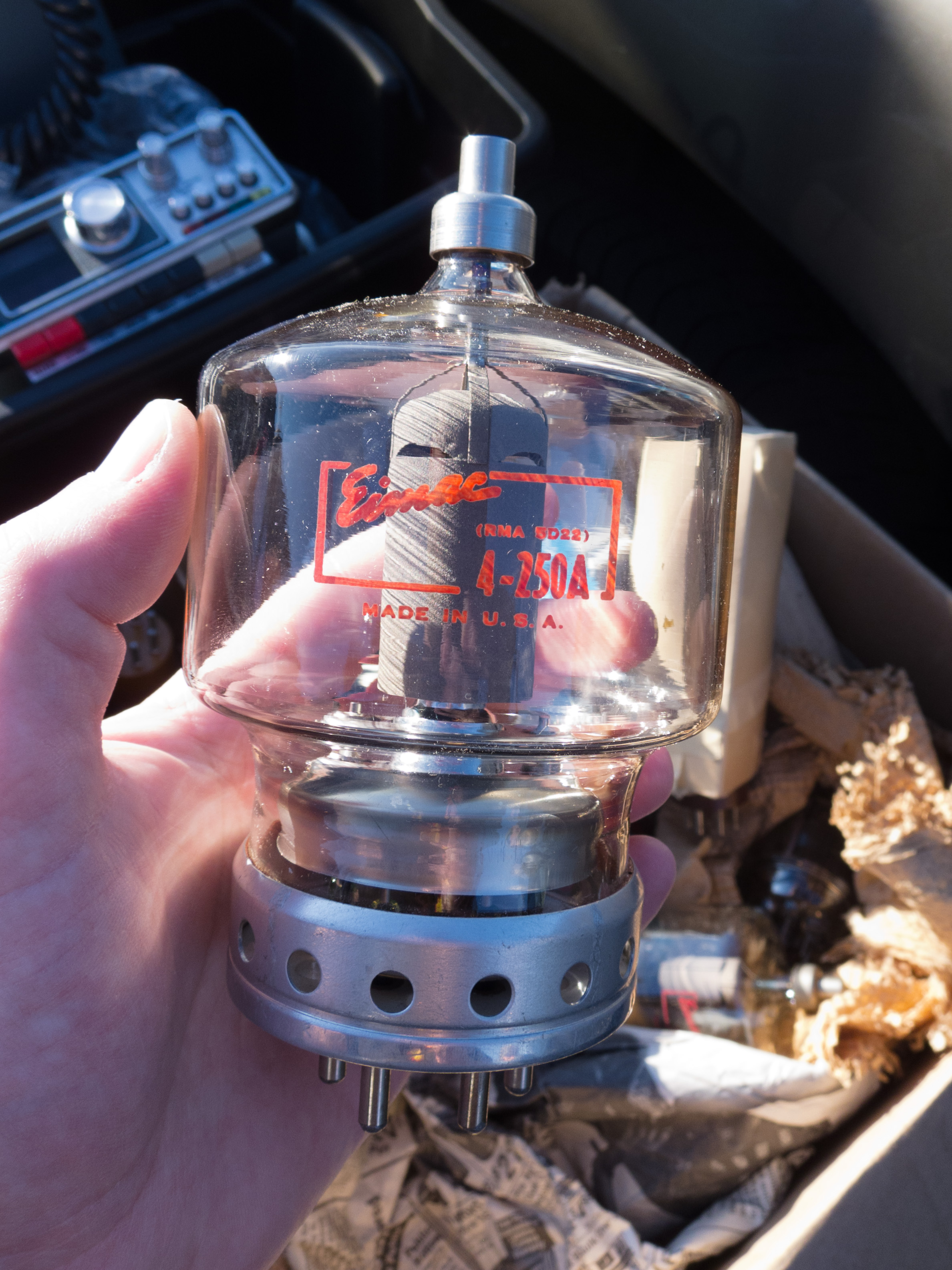
EIMAC 4-250A power tetrode

As wartime orders ceased and a large supply of military surplus transmission tubes flooded the market the firm laid off 90% of its workers and closed its plant in Salt Lake City. Reallocation of the FM band by the FCC in 1945, however, provided an opportunity for the firm to market a superior power tetrode tube which it had developed.

Beginning in 1947, Eimac operated FM radio station KSBR from their plant in San Bruno, California, one of only two FM stations in the United States to test the new Rangertone tape recorders (adapted from the German Magnetophon recorders). In need of more space, the company moved to San Carlos in 1959. Eimac's San Carlos plant was dedicated on April 16, 1959. By that time, the company had the following subsidiaries: National Electronics, Inc., Geneva, Illinois, and Eitel-McCullough, S.A., Geneva, Switzerland. During the Cold war era, Eimac supplied U.S. military with klystron power tubes and electron power tubes used in the defense communications network, navigation, detection, ranging and fire-control radars.

In the beginning of May 1959, the company announced its newly-produced giant klystron tube powered the Massachusetts Institute of Technology’s radar which recently established contact with planet Venus. The super-power klystron was developed under Rome Air Development Center sponsorship. Eimac klystrons also were chosen for NATO's tropospheric scatter communications network.

In 1965, Eimac merged with Varian Associates and became known as the Eimac Division. In August 1995, Varian Associates sold the Electron Device Business to Leonard Green & Partners, a private equity fund, and members of management. Together, they formed Communications & Power Industries.

In January 2004, affiliates of The Cypress Group, a private equity fund, acquired CPI.

In February 2011, an affiliate of Veritas Capital, a private equity investment firm acquired CPI.

In 2006 CPI relocated the Eimac facility from 301 Industrial Road, San Carlos to their operation in Palo Alto.
