= NPK International =

Worldwide provider of value-added drilling fluids systems and composite matting systems

Newpark Resources Inc.
- Type: Public
- Traded as: NYSE: NR
- Founded: 1932
- Headquarters: Woodlands, Texas, United States
- Area served: Worldwide
- Revenue: $1.12 Billion (As of 2013)
- Number of employees: 2,248
- Website: www.newpark.com

Newpark Resources, Inc. is a worldwide provider of value-added drilling fluids systems and composite matting systems used in oilfield and other commercial markets. Industry partners include American Petroleum Institute, Independent Petroleum Association of America - IPAA, US Chamber of Commerce et al. The company was founded in 1932 and is based in The Woodlands, Texas. In 2013, the company was awarded as one of the Top Customer Satisfaction companies in the Annual EnergyPoint Research Global Oil & Gas Industry Survey. The enterprise value of the company (As of February 2013) is $1.14 billion.

== Operations ==
The company operates its business through three segments globally, mainly in regions including North America, Europe, Middle East and Africa. In detail, Mats and Integrated Service Segment provides services for the United States, and Environmental Service Segment, which was sold for $100 million to Ecoserv LLC in 2014, serves United States Gulf Coast.

On December 31, 2012, the company acquired operations of Alliance Drilling Fluids, LLC. In June 2013, the wholly owned subsidiary of the company, Newpark Drilling Fluids, expanded in Katy. It opened a 106,000-square-foot office and lab space with a volume capacity of over 140 employees.
