= Lorenzo Simonelli (business manager) =

Italian businessman

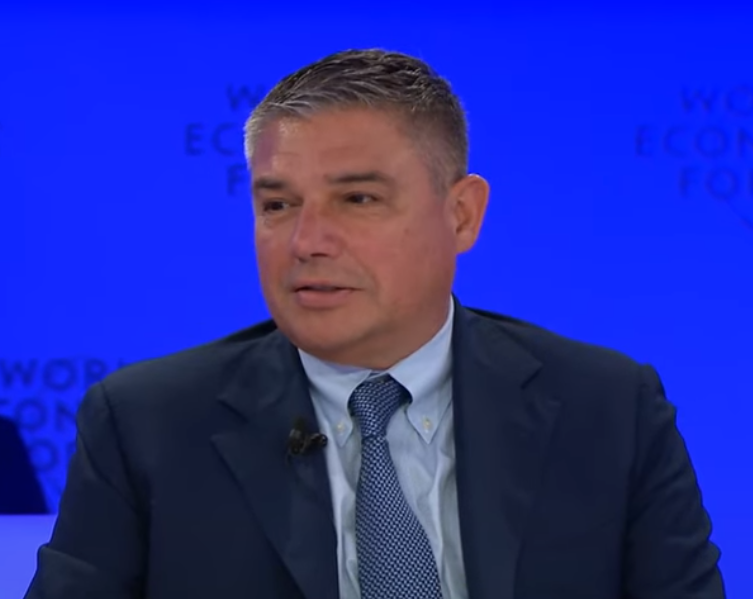
- At the 2024 World Economic Forum
- Born: 1973 (age 52–53); Tuscany, Italy
- Education: Cardiff University; University of Florence
- Occupation: Businessman
- Title: CEO, Baker Hughes
- Term: February 2017-
- Predecessor: Martin Craighead
- Board member of: Chairman of the U.S.-Russia Business Council. Board member of CNH Industrial and C3.ai.

Lorenzo Simonelli is the Chairman, President and Chief Executive Officer of Baker Hughes, an energy technology company.

== Early life and education ==
Simonelli is originally from Tuscany, Italy, where his family owns a vineyard producing wine and olive oil. He moved to London with his father aged 9 and was educated at Highgate School.

Simonelli holds a Bachelor's degree in Business and Economics from Cardiff University, and he received a master's degree honoris causa in Chemical Sciences from the University of Florence in January 2016 "as an acknowledgment for his excellent managerial commitment to develop advanced research in the field of chemical sciences, with particular attention to results that have technological importance."

== Career ==
Simonelli started his career in International and Corporate Finance at Mitsubishi Bank. One of his father's friends, former GE Vice Chairman and chairman of Fiat, Paolo Fresco, advised him to look at GE's training programs. Simonelli joined GE's Financial Management Program in 1994.

In 1997 Simonelli joined GE's Corporate Audit Staff and had assignments in Asia, Europe and the U.S. around both financial and process improvement areas. He progressed to be executive audit manager for European Industrial Businesses in 2001. In 2002, he joined Consumer Products as the financial planning and analysis manager. In April 2004, he became CFO Americas for Consumer & Industrial before being appointed to general manager, Product Management for Appliances, Lighting, Electrical Distribution and Motors in 2005. In 2007 he was promoted to President & CEO EMEA of GE Consumer and Industrial.

In 2008 Simonelli became GE's youngest ever division chief and the first non-American to run GE Transportation. In 2013, he was appointed president of GE's Oil and Gas division, which he ran until the division was merged with Baker Hughes Inc in 2017, becoming Baker Hughes, a GE Company (NYSE:BHGE). He became CEO of the newly formed company, and following GE's divestment from the company in 2019, has continued on as CEO of the independent Baker Hughes Company (NYSE:BKR).

== Awards and recognition ==
Simonelli has been named in Fortune's Forty under Forty in 2009 and 2010. He was named as Petroleum Economist's CEO of the Year in 2019, and listed by ALLY's Energy Voice of 2020 as a leader in the Energy Transition.

== Personal life ==
Simonelli is married, and lives in Houston, Texas.
