= Chemlink =

Wireless communication products brand

Chemlink is a brand name for wireless video transmission products made by the Chung-Hsin Electric and Machinery Manufacturing Corporation Wireless Communication Division.

== Background ==
The company is on a 5.8 GHz wireless transmission for audio and video. Not only OEM/ODM audio/video senders for many worldwide brand companies, also supply their video transmitter or receiver modules for the remote monitoring systems, wireless cameras or wireless CCTVs makers for professional and surveillance markets.

Wireless solutions make use of the 5.8 GHz range to avoid interference from the increasingly crowded 2.4GHz radio band, which is widely used by WLAN 802.11b/g, Bluetooth devices, Cordless phones and Microwave ovens. Therefore, 5.8 GHz solutions are getting more and more public to use in home video transmission, especially in North America and Australia. In the security and surveillance markets, especially for long range video transmissions, more people are starting to use 5.8 GHz frequency for cleaner bandwidth for better outcome.

In 1956, Chung-Hsin Electric and Machinery Manufacturing Corporation was established. During the early years, the major scope of this company's business was focused on the manufacture of electric motors and generators. In 1970, they stepped into the market of home appliances including air-conditioners. Before long, they took the lead in the production of air conditioners, refrigerators and washing machines in Taiwan. In 1983, operating with Hitachi, Japan, they successfully developed SF_{6} gas insulated switchgear and gas insulated circuit breakers. Ten years later in 1993, in accordance with Taiwan government's policy, they actively participated in large-scaled, “Turn-Key,” engineering projects of the government. The total contract value was 18 billion NT dollars. The company was transformed again in 2000. Since then, they have been engaged in RF Radio frequency and wireless communication manufacturing business. They started to use Chemlink as a brand name of their AV sender products line.
