= Moffat (company) =

Stove company in Weston, Toronto

- Formerly: T.L. Moffat and Sons, Moffat Stove Company
- Type: Private company
- Industry: Home appliance
- Founded: 1892 Markdale, Ontario
- Founder: Thomas Lang Moffat
- Defunct: 1971
- Fate: Acquired
- Successor: GSW later the Canadian Appliance Manufacturing Company (Camco)
- Headquarters: Weston, Toronto, Canada
- Area served: Canada
- Products: Stoves and heaters

Moffat Stove Company was a Canadian stove manufacturer that was established in 1892 in Weston, Toronto, Ontario. It manufactured stoves and ranges that have been widely distributed across the continents and even used extensively in Europe and Asia.

Moffat Stoves are credited with inventing the first electric ranges for the domestic market. And although the Moffat family sold the business in 1953, stoves and refrigerators continued to be built at the Weston plant until the early 1970s.

== History ==
=== Early years and growth ===
The company was started by Thomas Lang Moffat (born in Crossfire, Fife, Scotland in 1836) who emigrated to Canada with his family when he was 5 years old. He started an iron and brass castings company in Dundas, Ontario with a Mr. McCallum. Eventually, he moved to Owen Sound where he got a job as a moulder at the firm of William Kennedy & Sons. In 1882, he moved to Markdale, Ontario where he founded a general engineering and machine shop, T.L. Moffat and Sons. They produced mill machinery, steam engines, pulleys, plows, mangles, and various ornamental castings in iron and brass.

Business was slow until the company was persuaded by a local hardware merchant that the future lay in stoves, so they turned their energies to this end, producing their first stove, the "Ploughboy" (which a picture of a man with a plough cast into the door). Soon afterward they set up a long-standing factory in Weston, Ontario, from where their manufactured stoves and ranges became widely distributed across the continents and even used extensively in Europe and Asia.

In 1907, T.L. Moffat died, and his eldest son, John King Moffat, took the company reins for the next 23 years. His sister Agnes, who was born in 1905, studied medicine and subsequently became Peterborough's newest female doctor. Her family was apparently not happy with her choice of vocation.

Frederick W. Moffat, son of the founder and brother of John King, was credited with at least 3 patents for stove construction, including a patent for an electric heating element in 1916, and other patents in 1920 and 1924.

=== Sale of the company and legacy ===
In 1927, five companies (McClary Manufacturing Company, London, Ontario; Sheet Metal Products Company of Canada Limited, Toronto; Thomas Davidson Manufacturing Company Limited, Montreal; E. T. Wright Limited, Hamilton, Ontario; and A. Aubry et fils Limitée, Montreal) merged to form General Steel Wares (GSW) Limited. They acquired the Happy Thought Foundry Company of Brantford, Ontario in 1920, followed by the Easy Washing Machine Company in 1958. In 1962, Beatty Brothers Limited of Fergus, Ontario acquired a controlling interest in GSW through a reverse take-over, merging the two large firms.

Under the leadership of Ralph Barford, GSW acquired the Moffat Company in 1971, making GSW the only Canadian-owned, full-line appliance company. The Moffat acquisition, probably Barford's largest, brought GSW into the big six full-line appliance makers. The other five, all foreign controlled, were Admiral, GE, Inglis, White, and Westinghouse.

GSW merged with General Electric Canada in 1977 to become the Canadian Appliance Manufacturing Company (Camco), making it the largest major appliance manufacturer in Canada. The same year the company acquired the major appliance operations of Westinghouse Canada, exclusive of the "Westinghouse" name. Those products were re-branded as "Hotpoint" and sold alongside the GE, Moffat and McClary brands. Under Camco, stoves and refrigerators continued to be built at the Weston plant until 1983 when production moved to Hamilton, Ontario and then off-shore.
