= Frank Stephen Baldwin =

American calculator inventor (1838–1925)

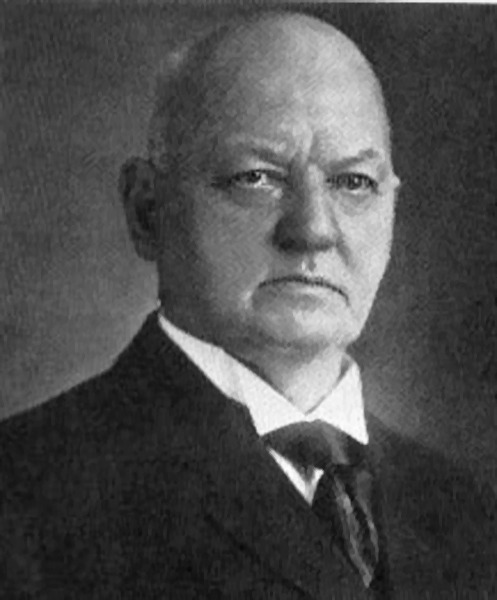
- Born: April 10, 1838; New Hartford, Connecticut
- Died: April 8, 1925 (aged 86); Denville, New Jersey
- Known for: calculating machine
- Spouse: Mary K. Denniston (Sept. 23, 1848 – July 15, 1928)
- Children: Frank Pardee Baldwin (Oct. 1, 1873 – March 16, 1946); Emma Virginia Baldwin (Feb. 14, 1877 – Feb. 25, 1952); Eugene Denniston Baldwin (1880–?); George Howard Baldwin (1890–1950); Elbert Stephen Baldwin (Jan. 5, 1882 – June 10, 1956); Lillian Isabel Baldwin (June 2, 1886 – May 23, 1916); Blanche Baker Baldwin (July 28, 1891-Nov. 22, 1969)

Frank Stephen Baldwin (April 10, 1838 – April 8, 1925) was an American who invented a pinwheel calculator in 1875. He started the design of a new machine in 1905 and was able to finalize its design with the help of Jay R. Monroe who eventually bought the exclusive rights to the machine and started the Monroe Calculating Machine Company to manufacture it.

== Early years ==
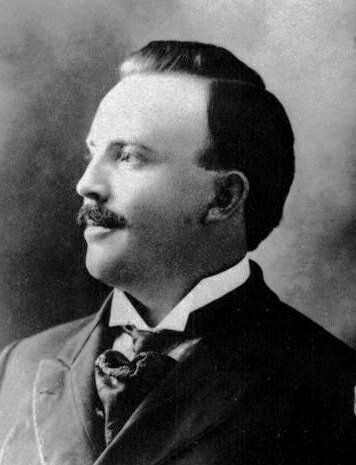
Frank Stephen Baldwin

He was born on April 10, 1838, in New Hartford, Connecticut. In 1840 the family moved to Nunda, New York, where he attended the Nunda Institute for elementary school. In 1854 he was enrolled at Union College in Schenectady, New York, but left when his father had an accident that left him as an invalid for the rest of his life. Frank then took over the management of his father's architectural business. In 1855, Frank applied for a patent on an "arrowhead self-coupler" for railroad cars, but the patent was rejected.

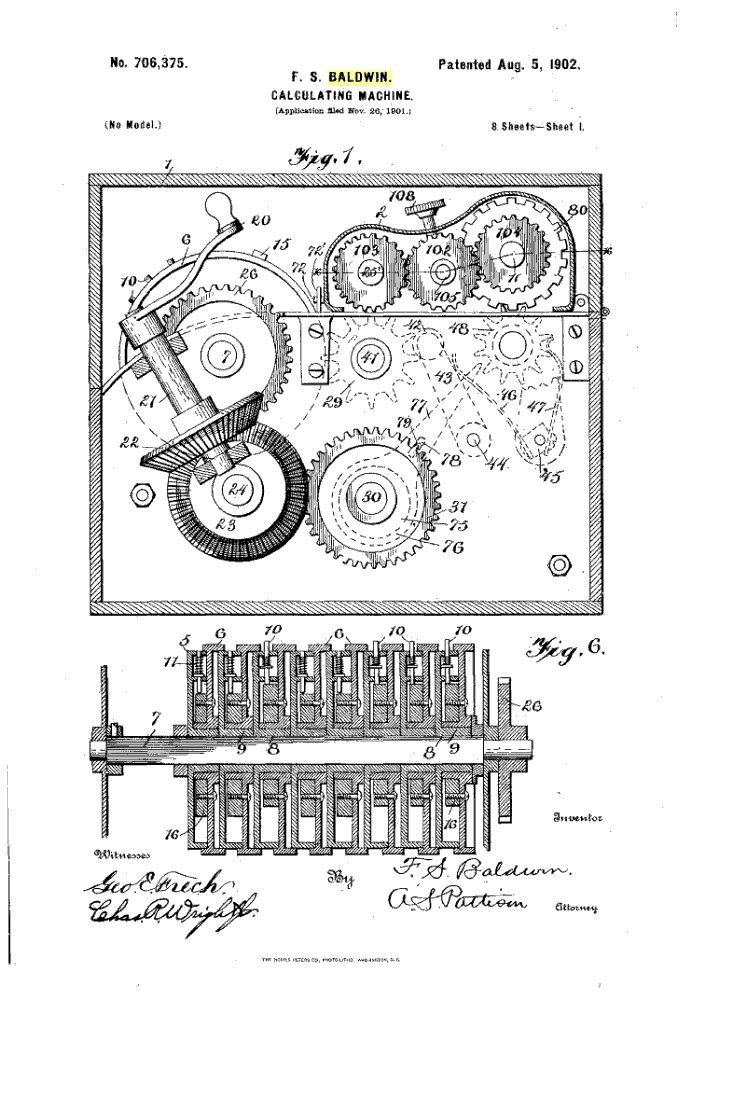
Calculating Machine

Shortly thereafter, he invented and patented the "Recording Lumber Measure". This device started him thinking about calculating machines and this point really marks the birth of the Monroe calculator. In the office of a life insurance company at St. Louis, he had seen an arithmometer, a calculating machine devised by Charles Xavier Thomas around 1820 and which, at the time, was the only mechanical desktop calculator in commercial production. To create a model based on his ideas he hired William Seward Burroughs I to perform the work in his machine shop, which he, with his father, had in St. Louis.

== Marriage ==
In October 1872, he married Mary K. Denniston of Williamsport, Pennsylvania. She was visiting relatives in St. Louis when they met. Together they had seven children: Frank Pardee Baldwin (1873–1946) who was born in Philadelphia; Emma Virginia Baldwin (1877–1952) who was born in St. Louis, and worked as a librarian at the public library; Eugene Denniston Baldwin (1880–1963) who was born in St. Louis, and worked as an insurance clerk; George Howard Baldwin (1890–1950); Lillian Isabel Baldwin (1886–1916); and Blanche Baker Baldwin (1891–1969) who was born in New Jersey, and worked as a clerk at the YMCA.

In 1873 they moved to Philadelphia where he made ten of his calculating machines. When the calculating machine was finished, he sold one to the office of the Pennsylvania Railroad and was referred to George M. Taylor, Auditor of Freight Receipts. He then designed an adding machine called the "arithmometer" and his patent was issued on July 28, 1874. It was one of the first adding machines sold in the United States.

== Europe ==
Wilgott Theophil Odhner developed a similar pinwheel machine also based on Thomas' arithmometer and took out patents in all European countries and in the United States in 1878. It took him another 12 years to perfect the design so that it could be manufactured effectively. In 1890 his workshop soon followed by several large manufacturing companies in Europe started production. His machine, called Odhner's Arithmometer then appeared under ten to fifteen names in Europe, the most important being Brunsviga and Triumpator, which were manufactured in Germany.

== Death ==
Baldwin died at age 86 in 1925 in a private hospital in Morristown, New Jersey, following an operation.
