= Nevada County Airport =

Nevada County Air Park Nevada County Airport
- IATA: none; ICAO: KGOO; FAA LID: GOO

Summary
- Airport type: Public
- Owner: Nevada County
- Location: Grass Valley, California
- Elevation AMSL: 3,158 ft / 962 m
- Coordinates: 39°13′26″N 121°00′11″W
- Website: About the Airport
- Interactive map of Nevada County Air Park

Runways
Direction	Length		Surface
Direction	ft	m	Surface
7/25	4,657	1,419	Asphalt

Statistics (2017)
- Aircraft operations: 27,750
- Based aircraft: 134
- Source: FAA and airport website

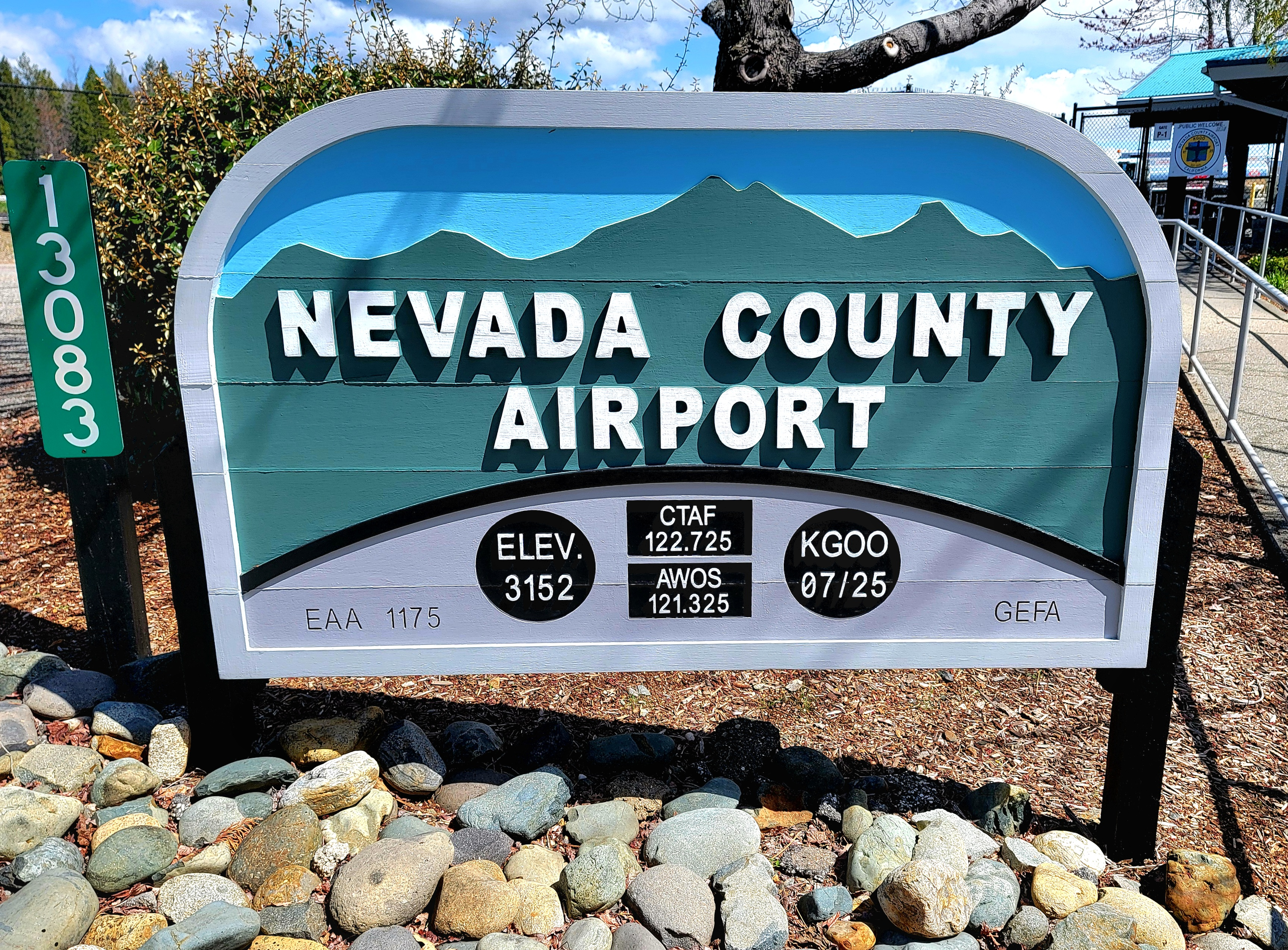
Nevada County Airport sign

The Nevada County Airport (ICAO: KGOO, FAA LID: GOO, formerly O17) is a public airport in Nevada County, California, three miles east of Grass Valley, California. It is also known as Nevada County Air Park.

Most U.S. airports use the same three-letter location identifier for the Federal Aviation Administration (FAA) and IATA, but this airport is GOO to the FAA and has no IATA code. (IATA assigned GOO to an airport in Goondiwindi, Queensland, Australia.)

== History ==
The air park was built by local entrepreneur Errol MacBoyle to fly gold mined by his Idaho–Maryland Mine Corporation to Mills Field, now known as San Francisco International Airport. From there it was driven to the San Francisco Mint by the company's treasurer. Located on MacBoyle's Loma Rica Ranch property, Loma Rica Airport was a mile east of MacBoyle's residence. By 1934, the airstrip included a hangar, shops, and a full time radio operator. Eventually, the airport included lights for night landings on its 2400 foot airstrip.

The airport was closed down at the onset of World War II due in part to the government shutdown of mining operations along with the wartime ban on civilian flight within 150 miles of the coast of California. The airport property was purchased from the MacBoyle estate by Charles Litton Sr. in 1955. Litton had previously moved his company's engineering laboratory to Grass Valley in 1953. After acquiring the property, Litton spent $10,000 to repair the runway that had fallen into disrepair and partnered with local government and businesses through the Grass Valley Chamber of Commerce to reopen the airport and build an industrial park in order to attract new business to the region.

The airport was reopened in 1956 and renamed Loma Rica Airport. In 1957, the airport and access roads were given to Nevada County. The United States Forest Service and California Department of Forestry and Fire Protection began using the airport as a base for their wildfire air attack operations in 1958. A major renovation took place in 1965 when the landing strip was lengthened to 4,000 feet (1,200 m). In 1994 a 3000 square foot terminal was added and the following year the landing strip was again extended.

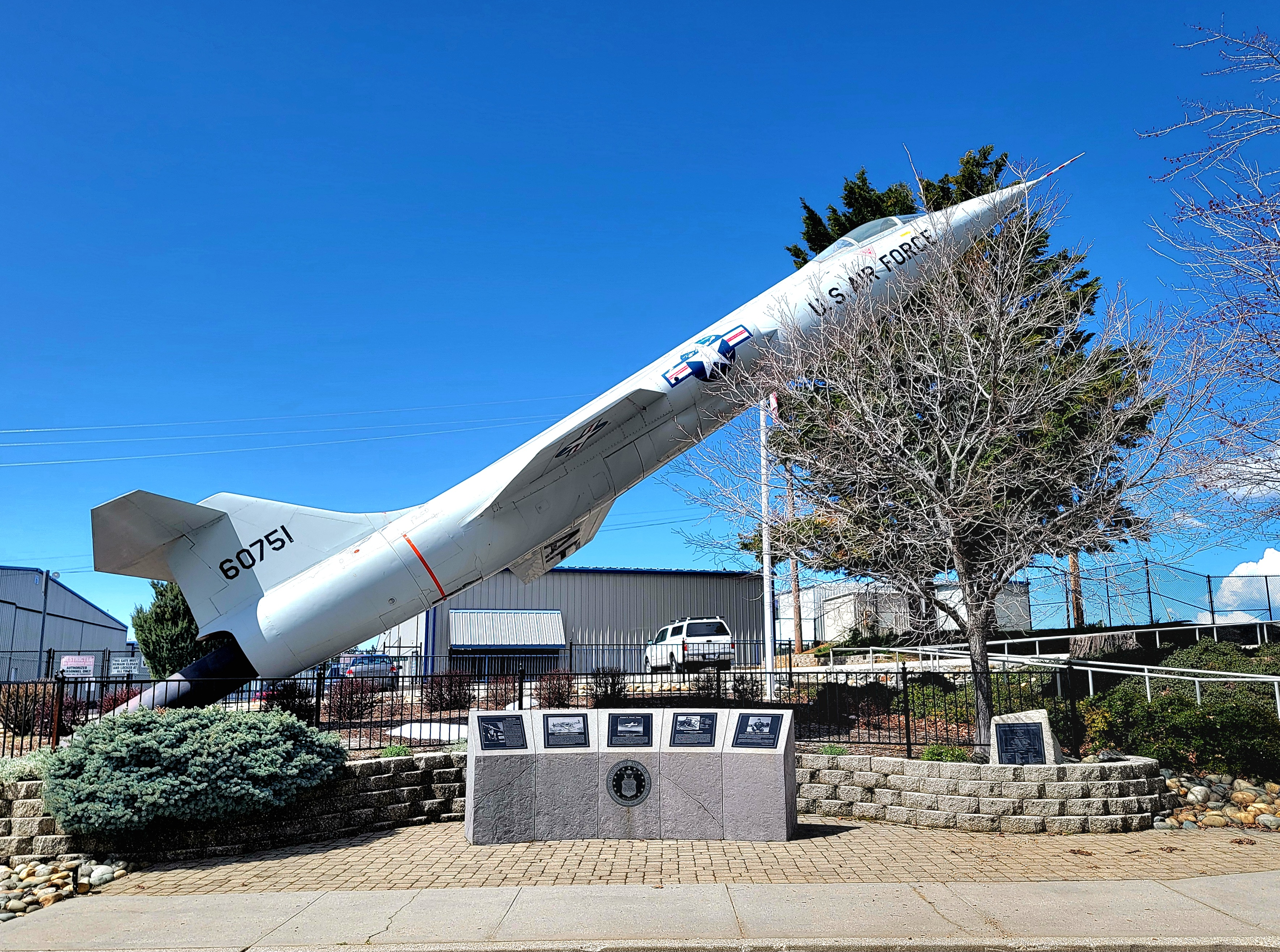
The Chuck Yeager monument at the Nevada County Airport features an F-104 Starfighter jet

The airport is the location of a monument to famed aviator and test pilot Chuck Yeager. The monument consists of a F-104 Starfighter jet and a row of five plaques commemorating Yeager's long career.

== Facilities ==
Nevada County Air Park covers 117 acres (47 ha) at an elevation of 3,158 feet (962 m). Its single runway, 7/25, is 4,657 by 75 feet (1,419 x 23 m).

In the year ending December 31, 2017 the airport had 27,750 aircraft operations, average 76 per day: 96% general aviation and 4% air taxi. 134 aircraft were then based at this airport — 122 single-engine, 9 multi-engine, 2 glider, and 1 helicopter.

== Events ==
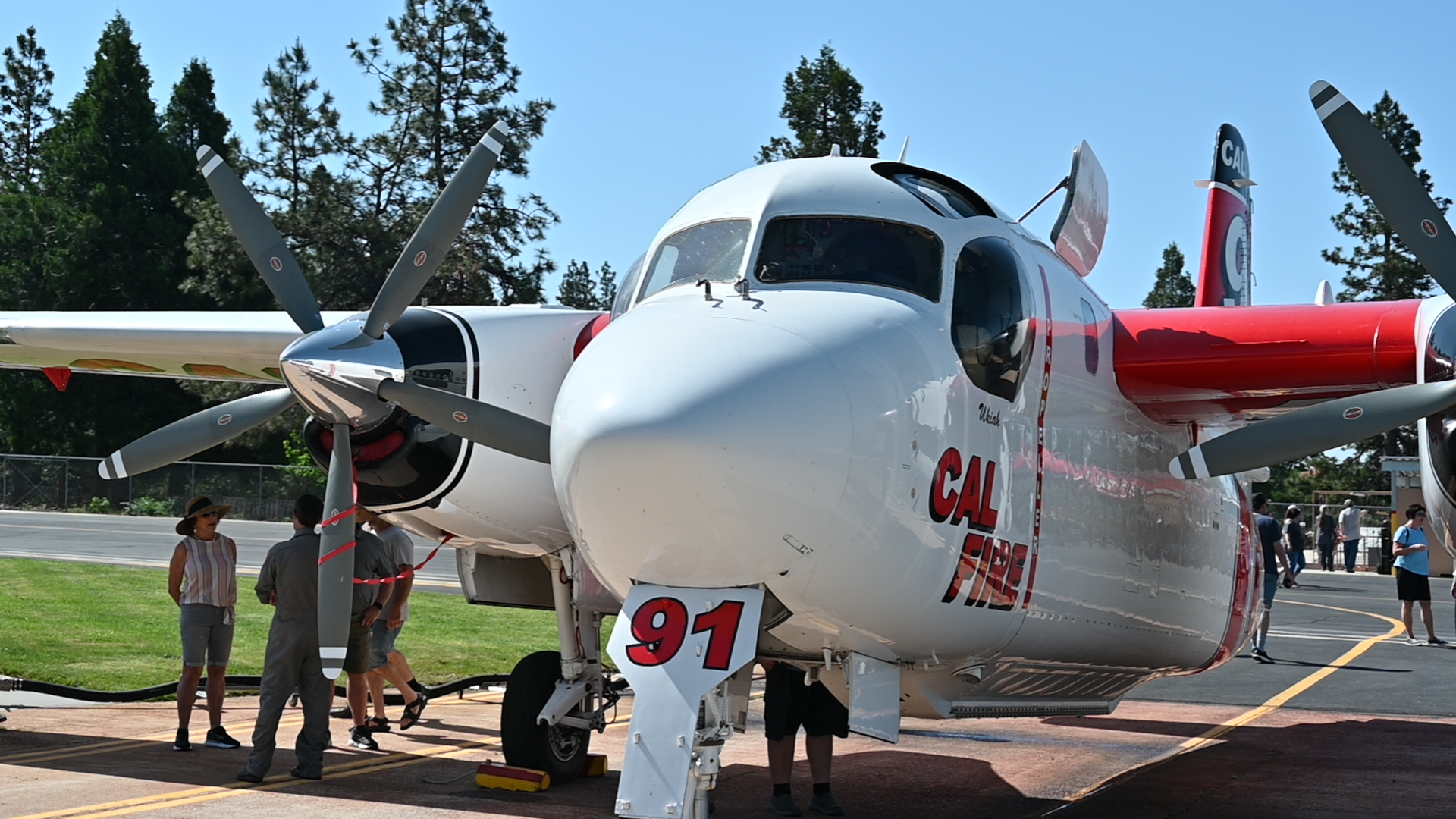
A CAL FIRE S-2T displayed at Armed Forces Day

On the third Saturday of May during select years, Armed Forces Day occurs in Nevada County Air Park. The event features law enforcement aircraft and land vehicles, fire engines, civilian aircraft, a small car show for civilians, an array of CAL FIRE and United States Forest Service equipment are showed in addition of flyovers.

== Air attack base ==
Grass Valley Air Attack Base (GVAAB) is an air attack base operated by the California Department of Forestry and Fire Protection (CAL FIRE). Three aircraft are stationed at Grass Valley, two S-2 Trackers and one OV-10 Bronco.

In 2021, aircraft assigned to GVAAB flew 947 firefighting missions to assist with 247 fires.
