= Litton Industries =

Defunct American defense contractor

Litton Industries, Inc.
- Type: Public
- Traded as: NYSE: LIT
- Industry: Defense
- Founded: 1953; 73 years ago
- Founders: Charles Bates "Tex" Thornton; Roy Ash; Hugh Jamieson
- Defunct: 2001
- Fate: Acquired by Northrop Grumman
- Successor: Northrop Grumman
- Headquarters: Beverly Hills, California, U.S.
- Products: Shipbuilding; Aerospace; Electronic components Information technology
- Website: Archived May 15, 2001, at the Wayback Machine

Litton Industries, Inc. was an American defense contractor that specialized in shipbuilding, aerospace, electronic components, and information technology. The company was founded in 1953 and was named after inventor Charles Litton Sr., who was also an early investor in the company.

During the 1960s, the company began acquiring many unrelated firms and became one of the largest conglomerates in the United States. At its peak, in addition to many defense-related companies, it also owned both Royal Typewriters and Adler, Moffat major appliances, Stouffer Corporation foods and hospitality, and various office equipment and furniture companies.

Like many conglomerates, the company suffered significant declines in the 1970s, selling off many of its unrelated brands and had largely returned to its defense roots by the 1980s. The company continued to shrink after the ending of the Cold War and by the late 1990s was a corporate takeover target. The company was purchased by Northrop Grumman in 2001.

== History ==
First logo, introduced in 1958

Litton Industries was originally established as an electronics company building navigation, communications and electronic warfare equipment. They diversified and became a much larger business, with major shipyards, and manufacturing microwave ovens.

It was founded in 1953 by American business executive Charles Bates "Tex" Thornton alongside his associates Roy Ash and Hugh Jamieson. Headquartered in Beverly Hills, California, the original name of the company was 'Electro Dynamics Corporation.' In 1954, with a loan from the Lehman Brothers, Thornton acquired the vacuum tube producer 'Litton Industries Inc' from its founder Charles Litton Sr. for $1.5 million and subsequently adopted its name.

Although Litton Industries lacked capital in the beginning, Thornton thought that the U.S. Department of Defense would need more sophisticated weapons and that the demand for another large electronics company would increase. During the years, Litton Industries acquired several other smaller companies and had merged with Monroe Calculating Machine. Monroe used Litton's technological assets and Litton required Monroe's sales and service outlets. During the late 1950s and early 1960s, 50% of Litton's business was with the U.S. Government; besides calculators, it was also producing inertial guidance systems for aircraft, potentiometers, duplexers, etc.

In 1961, Litton acquired Ingalls Shipbuilding for $8 million and subsequently ventured into the production of submarines and oil-drilling equipment. By 1963, Litton Industries reached $500 million with a revenue of $393.8 million.

In December 1964, Litton acquired Royal McBee. In 1968, Litton acquired the D. Van Nostrand Company and Chapman-Reinhold and merged them to form the publisher Van Nostrand-Reinhold.

In 1969, the company acquired Triumph-Adler, a major typewriter manufacturer based in Germany and the sixth-largest European office equipment manufacturer at the time.

In 1973, after several years of disappointing sales, Thornton replaced Ash with Fred O'Green as president of the company. With the new strategy, Litton sold some of its profit-losing subsidiaries and focused on the profitable ones. The company also succeeded to make a $1.6 billion deal with the Saudi Arabian Air Force.

The profits of the company increased from $44 million in 1979 to $78 million in 1983.

During the 1980s, Litton dropped its businesses in publishing, medical products, office furniture, and microwaves and shifted the production to sophisticated technology. As a result of that, the company bought the electronic firms Itek Corp. and Core Laboratories. In the early 1990s, Litton Industries split into separate military and commercial companies. The US$2 billion commercial business, which included Litton's oilfield services, business, and automated assembly line operations, was named Western Atlas, Inc.

In 1998, Litton Industries bought TASC, Inc. In 2000, TASC sold three stand-alone commercial operations: Adesso Software, WSI (Weather Services International) Corporation and Emerge. The company reported sales of $5.6 billion and a net income of $218 million for the 2000 fiscal year.

On December 21, 2000, in a joint statement, Litton Industries and Northrop Grumman announced that the latter will acquire Litton Industries shares in a transaction worth $5.1 billion. The transaction was completed on May 31, 2001, and Northrop Grumman officially acquired Litton Industries.

== Divisions ==
A provisional list of Litton Industries' major divisions:

- LITEF GmbH (Freiburg, Germany)
- Litton Advanced Systems
- Litton Aero Products
- Litton Automated Marine Systems (AMS)
  - Sperry Marine
  - C.Plath
  - Load monitoring System for Spanish Product Carriers (IMP-16 based embedded system w/real-time monitoring and calculation of shear forces and bending moment for load officers)
  - Decca Radar (formerly a division of Racal)
    - Decca Navigator, a historical VLF navigation system
- Litton Bionetics, Fort Detrick, Frederick, MD
- Litton Computer Services
- Litton Datalog
- Litton Data Systems
- Litton Electron Devices → now L3 Technologies, Electron Devices: Torrance CA & Williamsport PA
- Litton Electro-Optical Systems Incorporated
- Litton Encoder
- Litton Guidance and Control Systems
- Litton Industries, Potentiometer Division, Mount Vernon, NY
- Litton Industries - Clifton Precision, Clifton Heights, PA
- Litton Integrated Systems
- Litton Italia
- Litton Jefferson Electric
- Litton Kester
- Louis Allis
- Litton Microwave Cooking Products
- Litton Monroe
- Litton Network Access Systems
- Litton Poly-Scientific
- Litton PRC
- Litton Ship Systems
  - Avondale Shipyard
  - Ingalls Shipbuilding
- Litton Space Systems
- Litton Systems Canada
- Litton Triad-Utrad
- Litton Unit Handling Systems
- Litton Westrex
- TELDIX
- Western Atlas, a joint venture formed with Dresser Industries, including former Litton subsidiary Western Geophysical. Spun off in 1994.

== See also ==
- Litton Industries bombing
- Robert Williams (robot fatality)
