= Thornton (surname) =

Thornton is a surname found in Ireland and Britain.

Bearers of the surname include:

== People ==
=== A ===
- Agathe Thornton (1910–2006), New Zealand scholar
- Al Thornton (born 1983), American basketball player
- Alfred Thornton (1853–1906), English footballer
- Alicia Thornton (fl.1804), British horsewoman
- Alice Thornton (1626–1707), English writer
- Alison Thornton, Canadian-American actress
- Allie Thornton (born 1997), American soccer player
- Alvin Thornton, American university administrator
- Amara Thornton, American historian
- Andre Thornton (born 1949), American baseball player
- Andrew Thornton (born 1972), British jockey
- Andrew C. Thornton II (1944–1985), American narcotics officer, lawyer and drug smuggler
- Anna Thornton (c.1775–1865), American diarist, wife of William Thornton (1759–1828)
- Anna Thornton (linguist) (born 1960), Italian morphologist
- Anne Thornton (born 1981), American pastry chef and food writer
- Anne Jane Thornton (1817–1877), Irish cross-dresser
- Ant Thornton, American politician
- Anthony Thornton (field hockey) (born 1967), New Zealand field hockey player
- Anthony Thornton (politician) (1814–1904), American politician from Illinois
- Anthony Thornton (writer) (born 1971), British music journalist
- A. G. Thornton (1886–1969), British writer and journalist
- Archibald Paton Thornton (1921–2004), Scottish historian
- Argonne Thornton known as Sadik Hakim (1919–1983), American jazz pianist and composer
- Arland Thornton (born 1944), American sociologist
- Arthur Thornton (1854–1915), English cricketer
- Auden Thornton, American actress

=== B ===
- Barbara Thornton (1950–1998), American singer and musicologist
- Barry Thornton (born 1952), British Royal Air Force officer
- Barry Thornton (cricketer) (born 1941), Australian cricketer
- Barry Thornton (footballer) (1940–2023), Australian rules footballer
- Margaret Bartlett Thornton (1901–1981), American pilot and poet
- Betsy Thornton, American novelist
- Bianca Thornton, birth name of Lady Bianca (born 1953), American singer and songwriter
- Big Mama Thornton (Willie Mae Thornton; 1926–1984), American blues singer
- Bill Thornton, American politician from Texas
- Bill Thornton (American football) (1939–2008), American football player
- Billy Thornton (rugby league), England rugby league footballer (fl. 1920s–1940s)
- Billy Bob Thornton (born 1955), American actor, filmmaker and singer-songwriter
- Blair Thornton (born 1950), Canadian guitarist
- Bob Thornton (born 1962), American basketball player and coach
- Bonnell Thornton (1725–1768), English poet and essayist
- Bonnie Thornton (c.1871–1920), American vaudeville comedian and singer
- Bootsy Thornton (born 1977), American basketball player
- Bret Thornton (born 1983), Australian rules footballer
- Brian Thornton (born 1985), American volleyball player and coach
- Brigid Lyons Thornton (1896–1987), Irish revolutionary and doctor
- Bruce Thornton (basketball) (born 2003), American basketball player
- Bruce Thornton (classicist) (born 1953), American classicist
- Bruce Thornton (cornerback) (born 1980), American gridiron football player
- Bruce Thornton (defensive lineman) (born 1958), American football player
- Bubba Thornton (born 1947), American football player and sports coach

=== C ===
- Catherine Thornton, Australian immunologist and academic
- Cecilia Dart-Thornton (born 1961), Australian writer
- Cedric Thornton (born 1988), American football player
- Chandler Thornton, American political operative
- Charles Thornton (cricketer) (1850–1929), English cricketer
- Charles Jonas Thornton (1850–1932), Canadian politician
- Charles Wade Thornton (1764–1854), British military officer
- Charles E. Thornton (1935–1985), American journalist
- Charles Thornton-Duesbury (1867–1928), Manx Anglican bishop
- Charley Thornton (1936–2004), American college athletics administrator
- Christopher Thornton (born 1967), American actor
- Clara Grace Thornton (1913–1987), British diplomat and translator
- Claude Thornton (died 1939), British Anglican priest
- Cliff Thornton (born 1945), American drug policy activist
- Clifford Thornton (1936–1989), American jazz musician and activist
- Col Thornton (1927–2005), Australian rules footballer
- Colin Thornton-Kemsley (1903–1977), British politician
- Corey Thornton (born 2001), American football player

=== D ===
- D. Howard Thornton (Daniel Howard Thornton; 1870–1911), American architect
- Daniel I. J. Thornton (1911–1976), American politician from Colorado
- Dave Thornton (born 1979), Australian comedian
- David Thornton (actor) (born 1953), American actor
- David Thornton (American football) (born 1978), American football player and executive
- David Thornton (musician) (born 1978), British brass band musician
- David Howard Thornton (born 1979), American actor
- David F. Thornton (1924–2008), American attorney and politician from Virginia
- De'mario Monte Thornton, birth name of Raz-B
- Derryck Thornton (born 1997), American basketball player
- Dick Thornton (Canadian football) (1939–2014), American gridiron football player
- Dick Thornton (American football) (1908–1973), American football player
- Donna Ida Thornton, Australian fashion designer
- Dont'e Thornton (born 2002), American football player
- Douglas M. Thornton (1873–1907), English missionary
- Dudley Thornton (1919–2009), British soldier
- Duncan Thornton (born 1962), Canadian author

=== E ===
- Eddie Thornton (1931–2025), Jamaican trumpeter
- Edith Thornton (1896–1984), American actress
- Edmond Thornton (1841–1901), Australian politician in Queensland
- Edward Thornton (cricketer) (1893–1970), English military officer and cricketer, grandson of Edward Thornton, 2nd Count of Cacilhas
- Edward Thornton (politician) (fl.1854–1858), Canadian politician from Prince Edward Island
- Edward Parry Thornton (1811–1893), British colonial administrator in India
- Edward Thornton, 1st Count of Cacilhas (1766–1852), British diplomat
- Edward Thornton, 2nd Count of Cacilhas (1817–1906), British diplomat
- Eleanor Thornton (1880–1915), British actress and model
- Elizabeth Thornton (Mary Forrest George née Baxter; 1940–2010), British-Canadian pseudonymous novelist
- Elizabeth Thornton (English writer) (1787–1863), British novelist
- Ella May Thornton (1885–1971), American librarian
- Eric Thornton (1882–1945), British footballer in Belgium
- Ernest Thornton (1905–1992), British politician
- Ernie Thornton (1907–1969), Australian trade union leader

=== F ===
- Flora L. Thornton (1913–2010), American actress
- Floyd Martin Thornton (1884–1956), American film director
- Fonzi Thornton, American singer-songwriter
- Francis Thornton (soldier) (1747–1808), American soldier and plantation owner
- Frank Thornton (1921–2013), English actor
- Frank Thornton (cricketer) (1898–1987), English cricketer
- Frank Thornton (Irish republican) (1891–1965), Irish republican
- Frank Thornton (Savoyard) (1845–1918), English actor, singer and producer

=== G ===
- Gary Thornton (born 1963), English rugby league footballer and coach
- George Thornton (American football) (born 1968), American football player
- George Thornton (cricketer) (1867–1939), English cricketer
- George Thornton (politician) (1819–1901), Australian politician
- George Thornton (rugby union) (born 1997), Scottish rugby union footballer
- Giles Thornton (born 1998), American racing driver
- Glenys Thornton, Baroness Thornton (born 1952), British politician
- Godfrey Thornton (died 1805), English merchant and banker
- Grant Thornton (cricketer) (born 1992), English cricketer
- Guy Thornton (1872–1934), New Zealand chaplain and writer

=== H ===
- Harold Thornton (1915–2004), Australian artist
- Harry I. Thornton (c.1834–1895), American politician from California
- Henry Thornton (cricketer) (born 1996), Australian cricketer
- Henry Thornton (reformer) (1760–1815), English economist, banker, philanthropist and parliamentarian
- Henry Worth Thornton (1871–1933), American railway executive
- Howard Thornton (1849–1917), American politician from New York
- Hugh Thornton (civil servant) (1881–1962), British civil servant
- Hugh Thornton (gridiron football) (born 1991), American football player

=== I ===
- Ian Thornton (1926–2002), Australian zoologist
- Isaac Thornton (1615–1669), English Member of Parliament
- Izzy Thornton-Bott (born 1998), Australian middle-distance runner

=== J ===
- J. Lyndon Thornton (1886–1953), American politician from Nebraska
- Jack Thornton (baseball) (1909–2002), American baseball player
- Jack Thornton (basketball) (1914–2007), American basketball player
- Jack Thornton (rugby league) (1905–1996), Australian rugby league footballer
- James Thornton (actor) (born 1975), British actor
- James Thornton (cricketer) (1861–1916), English cricketer
- James Thornton (environmentalist) (born c.1954), American environmental lawyer and writer
- James Thornton (health economist) (born 1955), American economist and academic
- James Thornton (naval officer) (1826–1875), United States Navy officer
- James Thornton (songwriter) (1861–1938), Irish-American songwriter and vaudeville performer
- James Thornton (tight end) (born 1965), American football player
- James Innes Thornton (1800–1877), American politician from Alabama
- James Johnston Thornton (1816–1884), American judge
- James Worth Thornton (1906–1983), American businessman
- James D. Thornton (1823–1902), American judge in California
- James E. Thornton (1925–2005), American computer engineer
- James R. Thornton (1853–1911), American academic
- Jane Thornton (born 1978), Canadian sport medicine physician and rower
- Janet Thornton (born 1949), British bioinformatician and academic
- Jarvis Thornton (born 2006), English footballer
- Jazz Thornton (born 1995), New Zealand mental health activist
- Jean Thornton (died 1980), American politician
- Jeanne Thornton (born 1983), American author
- Jesse Quinn Thornton (1810–1888), American judge in Oregon
- Jessica Thornton (born 1998), Australian sprinter
- Jim Thornton (born 1964/5), American announcer and voice actor
- Joe Thornton (born 1979), Canadian ice hockey player
- Joe Thornton (archer) (1916–2019), American archer
- Joel Thornton, American atmospheric chemist
- John Thornton (American politician) (1846–1917), American politician from Louisiana
- John Thornton (athlete) (1911–1944), British hurdler
- John Thornton (Australian cricketer) (1835–1919), Australian cricketer
- John Thornton (baseball) (1869–1935), American baseball player
- John Thornton (Canadian politician) (1823–1888), Canadian politician in Quebec
- John Thornton (defensive tackle, born 1969) (born 1969), American football player
- John Thornton (defensive tackle, born 1976) (born 1976), American football player
- John Thornton (glass painter) (fl.1405–1433), English stained glass artist
- John Thornton (historian) (born 1949), American historian
- John Thornton (Leicestershire cricketer) (1902–1993), English cricketer
- John Thornton (MP), English member of parliament (MP) for Kingston upon Hull in 1554, 1562/3 and 1571
- John Thornton (philanthropist) (1720–1790), British merchant and Christian philanthropist
- John Thornton (venture capitalist) (1965–2025), American venture capitalist
- John Wingate Thornton (1818–1878), American lawyer and book collector
- John L. Thornton (born 1954), American businessman
- John P. Thornton (born 1984), American executive
- John R. Thornton (Arkansas politician) (1840–1910), American politician and lawyer from Arkansas
- John S. Thornton (born 1932), American Episcopal bishop
- J. Mills Thornton (Jonathan Mills Thornton III; born 1943), American historian
- Joseph Thornton (bookseller) (1808–1891), English bookseller in Oxford
- Joseph Thornton (biologist) (born 1965), American biologist
- Joseph Thornton (contractor) (1804–1889), English railway contractor
- Julia Thornton, British harpist
- Julian Thornton-Duesbery (1902–1985), British priest and academic, son of Charles Thornton-Duesbery
- Justine Thornton (born 1970), British barrister and judge

=== K ===
- Kalen Thornton (born 1982), American football player
- Kate Thornton (born 1973), English TV presenter
- Kathryn C. Thornton (born 1952), American scientist and astronaut
- Kayla Thornton (born 1992), American basketball player
- Keith Matthew Thornton, birth name of Kool Keith (born 1963), American rapper and producer
- Kelly Thornton (born 1997), Irish actress
- Kelly Thornton (director) (born 1965), Canadian theatre director and dramaturge
- Kevin Thornton (chef), Irish chef
- Kevin Thornton (footballer) (born 1986), Irish association football player
- Khyri Thornton (born 1989), American gridiron football player
- Kirk Thornton, American voice actor
- Kristin Thornton (born 1988), Australian rules footballer

=== L ===
- Lawrence Thornton (born 1937), American writer
- Lee Thornton (1941–2013), American journalist
- Leonard Thornton (1916–1999), New Zealand general
- Les Thornton (1934–2019), British professional wrestler
- Leslie Thornton (filmmaker) (born 1951), American filmmaker
- Leslie Thornton (sculptor) (1925–2016), English sculptor
- Lou Thornton (born 1963), American baseball player

=== M ===
- Mairtin Thornton (died 1984), Irish boxer
- Malcolm Thornton (born 1939), British politician
- Marcus Thornton (basketball, born 1987) (born 1987), American basketball player
- Marcus Thornton (basketball, born 1992) (born 1992), American basketball player
- Marcus Thornton (basketball, born 1993) (born 1993), American basketball player
- Marianne Thornton (1797–1887), English abolitionist, daughter of Henry Thornton (1760–1815)
- Mark Thornton (born 1960), American economist
- Marsha Thornton (born 1964), American singer-songwriter
- Marshall Thornton, American writer
- Martin Thornton (1915–1986), British theologian
- Mary Lindsay Thornton (1891–1973), American librarian and curator
- Matt Thornton (baseball) (born 1976), American baseball pitcher
- Matt Thornton (martial artist) (born 1969), American martial arts coach
- Matthew Thornton (1714–1803), American politician from New Hampshire and Founding Father
- Maxwell Thornton (1878–1950), English lawyer and politician
- Melanie Thornton (1967–2001), American singer
- Melody Thornton (born 1984), American singer and television personality
- Merle Thornton (1930–2024), Australian feminist activist and author
- Michael Thornton (Medal of Honor, awarded 1884) (born 1856), Irish-American naval seaman, Medal of Honor recipient
- Michael Patrick Thornton, American actor and theater director
- Michael B. Thornton (born 1954), American judge
- Michael E. Thornton (born 1949), United States Navy SEAL, Medal of Honor recipient
- Michael R. Thornton (born 1957), American actor and director
- Mike Thornton (politician) (born 1952), British politician
- Mildred Valley Thornton (1890–1967), Canadian artist
- Miles Thornton (born 1994), American motorcycle racer

=== N ===
- Nat Thornton, American tennis player
- Neville Thornton (born 1939/40), Northern Irish politician
- Neville Thornton (rugby union) (1918–1998), New Zealand rugby union footballer
- Noel Thornton (1943–2018), Australian rugby league footballer and coach
- Noley Thornton, American actress
- Nort Thornton (1933–2021), American swimming, diving and water polo coach

=== O ===
- Oliver Thornton (born 1979), British actor and singer
- Oscar Frank Thornton (1905–1992), American politician from South Carolina
- Otis Thornton (1945–2025), American baseball player

=== P ===
- Pat Thornton (born 1976), Canadian actor, comedian and writer
- Pat Thornton (rugby league), Australian rugby league footballer
- Patricia H. Thornton, American organizational theorist
- Patrick Thornton (1904–1961), South African cricketer
- Percy Thornton (1841–1918), British politician
- Peter Thornton (1925–2007), British art historian and writer
- Peter Thornton (judge) (born 1946), British judge
- Presley Thornton (1721–1769), American planter and politician in Virginia

=== R ===
- Randy Thornton (born 1964), American football player
- Ravi Thornton (born 1973), British writer
- Ray Thornton (1928–2016), American politician and judge from Arkansas
- Reggie Thornton (born 1967), American football player
- Richard Thornton (20 September 1776 – 20 June 1865), English merchant, trader and millionaire
- Richard Thornton (cricketer), English Anglican priest and cricketer
- Richard Thornton (landowner) (1922–2014), English landowner
- Richard Thornton (swimmer) (died 2024), American swimmer
- R. Ewell Thornton (1865–1928), American politician from Virginia
- Robert Thornton (darts player) (born 1967), Scottish darts player
- Robert Thornton (jockey) (born 1978), English jockey
- Robert Thornton (MP) (1759–1826), English politician, brother of the MPs Henry Thornton and Samuel Thornton
- Robert Thornton (sailor) (born 1941), Australian competitive sailor
- Robert Thornton (scribe) (fl.1418–1456), English landowner and scribe
- Robert John Thornton (1768–1837), British botanist and author
- Robert Lyster Thornton (1908–1985), British physicist
- Robert Stirton Thornton (1863–1936), Canadian politician
- Robert L. Thornton (1880–1964), American banker and politician from Texas
- Robert Y. Thornton (1910–2003), American jurist and politician in Oregon
- Robinson Thornton (1824–1906), English Anglican priest
- Rod Thornton, British soldier and defence studies academic
- Roger Thornton (died 1430), England merchant and Member of Parliament
- Ron Thornton (Australian footballer) (born 1961), Australian rules footballer
- Ron Thornton (rugby league) (1932–2024), Australian rugby league footballer
- Ron Thornton (visual effects designer) (1957–2016), British visual effects pioneer
- Rory Thornton (born 1995), Welsh rugby union footballer
- Ross Thornton (1956–2024), Australian rules footballer
- Russell Thornton (born 20 February 1942), Cherokee-American anthropologist
- Russell Thornton (writer), Canadian poet

=== S ===
- Sam Thornton (born 1996), English diver
- Samantha Thornton (born 1966), Australian basketball player
- Samuel Thornton (MP) (1754–1838), English banker and politician, son of John Thornton (1720–1790)
- Samuel Thornton (bishop) (1835–1917), British Anglican bishop
- Samuel W. Thornton (1832–1917, American politician from Nebraska
- Sara Thornton (police officer) (born 1962), British Chief Constable
- Sarah Thornton (born 1965), Canadian sociologist
- Scott Thornton (footballer) (born 1982), Australian rules footballer
- Scott Thornton (ice hockey) (born 1971), Canadian ice hockey player
- Shannon Thornton (born 1987), American actress
- Shawn Thornton (born 1977), Canadian ice hockey player
- Shelley Lynn Thornton (born 1970), American woman, the baby in Roe v. Wade
- Sherry Thornton, American biologist
- Sigrid Thornton (born 1959), Australian actress
- Simon Thornton (born 1977), Irish professional golfer
- Sidney Thornton (1954–2023), American football player
- Steve Thornton (born 1973), British ice hockey player
- Susan Thornton, American diplomat

=== T ===
- Tammie Thornton (born 1976), Australian soccer player
- Taylor Thornton, American lacrosse player
- Teri Thornton (1934–2000), American jazz singer
- Terrence Thornton, birth name of Pusha T (born 1977), American rapper
- Tex Thornton (Charles Bates Thornton; 1913–1981), American businessman
- Thomas Thornton (academic administrator) (c.1541–1629), Church of England priest and academic administrator
- Thomas Thornton (cricketer) (1922–1987), English RAF airman and cricketer
- Thomas Thornton (merchant) (1762–1814), British merchant in the Ottoman Empire and writer
- Thomas Thornton (politician) (1831–1897), American politician from Wisconsin
- Thomas Thornton (sportsman, died 1823) (1751/2–1823), English sportsman
- Thomas Henry Thornton (1832–1913), English judge in India and biographer
- Thomas Patrick Thornton (1898–1985), American judge in Michigan
- Thomas C. Thornton (1794–1860), American Methodist minister
- Tiffany Thornton (born 1986), American actress, radio personality and singer
- Tim Thornton (bishop) (born 1957), British Anglican bishop
- Tim Thornton (musician, born 1973) (born 1973), English musician, composer and novelist
- Tim Thornton (musician, born 1988) (born 1988), British jazz double bassist
- Tim Thornton (philosopher) (born 1965), British philosopher
- Todd Thornton (born 1982), American artistic gymnast
- Tom Thornton (footballer) (1885–1951), English footballer
- Tom Thornton (cricketer) (born 1989), Australian cricketer
- Tony Thornton (1959–2009), American professional boxer
- Tracy Thornton, American steelpan musician
- Trent Thornton (born 1993), American baseball player
- Tyler Thornton (born 1992), American basketball player and coach
- Tyquan Thornton (born 2000), American football player
- T. Eugene Thornton (1911–1967), American judge

=== V ===
- Valerie Thornton (1931–1991), British artist
- Victoria Thornton, British architect and civic activist
- Virgil Thornton Sr., American politician from Virginia

=== W ===
- Walter Thornton (1875–1960), American baseball player
- Walter Thornton (cricketer) (1858–1915), English cricketer
- Walter Clarence Thornton (1903–1990), American model and modeling agent
- Walter F. Thornton (died 1933), American Jesuit and university president
- Warwick Thornton, Australian film director
- William Thornton (1759–1828), American inventor and architect
- William Thornton (died 1769) (1712/3–1769), English politician
- William Thornton (1759–1828), American inventor and architect
- William Thornton (British Army officer) (1779–1840), British Army general
- William Thornton (firefighter) (1826–1848), Canadian firefighter
- William Thornton (Kansas politician), American politician from Kansas
- William Thornton (Queensland politician) (1817–1884), Australian politician in Queensland
- William Thornton (Virginia burgess) (1717–1790), American planter and politician
- William Patton Thornton (1817–1883), American physician and writer
- William Taylor Thornton (1843–1916), American politician in New Mexico
- William Thomas Thornton (1813–1880), English economist, civil servant and autho
- William Wheeler Thornton (1851–1932), American lawyer and judge in Indiana
- William E. Thornton (1929–2021), American astronaut
- William J. Thornton (1878–1951), American politician in Illinois
- William L. Thornton (1844–1915), American politician from New York State
- William Thornton known as Sydney Jim (1816–1858), English convict in Australia
- Willie Thornton (1920–1991), Scottish footballer and manager
- Willie Thornton (Canadian football) (born 1986), American gridiron football player

=== Y ===
- Yvonne Thornton (born 1947), American obstetrician and musician

=== Z ===
- Zac Thornton (born 2002), American baseball player
- Zach Thornton (born 1973), American soccer player and coach
- Zack Thornton (born 1998), American baseball player and coach

== Fictional characters ==
- Sean Thornton, protagonist of the film The Quiet Man, portrayed by John Wayne
- Tara Thornton, in The Southern Vampire Mysteries novel series and the television adaptation True Blood

== See also ==
- General Thornton (disambiguation)
- Judge Thornton (disambiguation)
- Senator Thornton (disambiguation)
- Thornton expedition
- Lynching of Jesse Thornton
- Tombstone of Charles Irving Thornton
- Thornden
