= John Thornton =

John Thornton may refer to:

== Sports ==
- John Thornton (Australian cricketer) (1835–1919), Australian cricketer
- John Thornton (Leicestershire cricketer) (1902–1993), English cricketer
- John Thornton (baseball), American baseball pitcher
- John Thornton (defensive tackle, born 1969), American football player
- John Thornton (defensive tackle, born 1976), American football player
- John Thornton (athlete) (1911–1944), British Olympic hurdler

== Government and politics ==
- John Thornton (MP), English member of parliament (MP) for Kingston upon Hull in 1554, 1562/3 and 1571
- John Thornton (Canadian politician) (1823–1888), Canadian merchant and politician in Quebec
- John Thornton (American politician) (1846–1917), American Louisiana politician and senator

== Business ==
- John Thornton (philanthropist) (1720–1790), British merchant and Christian philanthropist
- John L. Thornton (born 1954), American businessman, former president and co-COO of Goldman Sachs
- John P. Thornton, CEO of Astrobotic Technology Inc.
- John Thornton (venture capitalist) (1965–2025)

== Other ==
- John Thornton (glass painter) (fl. 1405–1433), English glazier and stained glass artist
- John Thornden or Thornton, English 16th-century bishop and university administrator
- John Thornton (cartographer) (1641–1708), English cartographer and hydrographer
- John Thornton (historian) (born 1949), American historian
- John S. Thornton (born 1932), American Episcopal bishop
- John Wingate Thornton, American lawyer, historian, antiquarian, book collector and author

== Fictional characters ==
- John Thornton, a leading character in Jack London's novel The Call of the Wild
- John Thornton (North and South), a leading character in Elizabeth Gaskell's novel North and South

== See also ==
- Jack Thornton (disambiguation)
