= Charles Thornton =

Charles Thornton may refer to:

- Tex Thornton (1913–1981), American businessman
- Charles Thornton (cricketer) (1850–1929), English cricketer
- Charles "Cookie" Thornton, resident of Kirkwood, Missouri involved, in Kirkwood City Council shooting
- Charles Irving Thornton (1841–1842), American infant from the state of Virginia
- Charles Jonas Thornton (1850–1932), political figure in Durham, Ontario
- Charles Wade Thornton (1764–1854), British military officer
- Charles E. Thornton (1930s–1985), medical reporter and the first American journalist killed in Afghanistan after the Soviet invasion of 1979
- Charley Thornton (1936–2004), American college athletics administrator
