= Jack Thornton =

Jack Thornton may refer to:

- Jack Thornton, prospector of Jolly Jack's Lost Mine
- Jack Thornton (baseball), American Negro league first baseman
- Jack Thornton (basketball), American basketball player
- Jack Thornton (rugby league), Australian rugby league player

== See also ==
- John Thornton (disambiguation)
