= Michael Thornton =

Michael or Mike Thornton may refer to:

- Michael Thornton (Medal of Honor, awarded 1884) (1856–?), United States Navy sailor and Medal of Honor recipient
- Michael B. Thornton (born 1954), United States Tax Court judge
- Michael E. Thornton (born 1949), United States Navy SEAL and Vietnam War Medal of Honor recipient
- Michael Patrick Thornton, American actor and theater director
- Mike Thornton (politician) (born 1952), British Liberal Democrat politician and former MP
- Michael R. Thornton (born 1957), American actor, director, producer, and jazz singer

== See also ==
- Thornton (surname)
