= Robert Thornton =

Robert Thornton may refer to:

== Politics ==
- Robert Thornton (MP) (1759–1826), British MP
- Robert Stirton Thornton (1863–1936), Manitoba politician
- Robert L. Thornton (1880–1964), American businessman, philanthropist, and mayor of Dallas, Texas
- Robert Y. Thornton (1910–2003), American attorney and politician

== Sports ==
- Robert Thornton (sailor) (born 1941), Australian sailor
- Bob Thornton (born 1962), American basketball player
- Robert Thornton (darts player) (born 1967), Scottish darts player
- Robert Thornton (jockey) (born 1978), English National Hunt jockey

== Other ==
- Robert Thornton (scribe) (died 1460), English scribe and compiler of manuscripts
- Robert John Thornton (1768–1837), English physician and writer on botany
- Robert Lyster Thornton (1908–1985), English/American physicist
- Robert Thornton (explorer)

== See also ==
- Thornton (surname)
