= James Thornton =

James Thornton may refer to:

== Entertainment ==
- James Thornton (songwriter) (1861–1938), American songwriter and vaudeville performer
- Jim Thornton (born 1965), American TV and radio announcer
- James Thornton (actor) (born 1975), English actor

== Politics and law ==
- James Innes Thornton (1800–1877), Alabama planter and politician
- James Johnston Thornton (1816–1884), judge, land developer, and quartermaster of the Union Army
- James D. Thornton (1823–1902), California Supreme Court Justice
- James Thornton (environmentalist), environmental lawyer and writer

== Other ==
- James Thornton (tight end) (born 1965), American football player
- James Thornton (cricketer) (1861–1916), English cricketer
- James Thornton (naval officer) (1826–1875), officer in the United States Navy during the American Civil War
- James R. Thornton (1853–1911), president of Hampden–Sydney College for two and a half weeks in 1904
- James Worth Thornton (1906–1983), businessman and scion of the Thorntons of Indiana
- James Thornton (health economist) (born 1955), professor of economics at Eastern Michigan University
- James E. Thornton, American computer scientist
