= Tim Thornton =

Tim Thornton may refer to:

- Tim Thornton (bishop) (born 1957), British Anglican Bishop of Truro and of Sherborne
- Tim Thornton (philosopher) (born 1966), English philosopher and academic
- Tim Thornton (musician, born 1973), English drummer, guitarist, composer and novelist
- Tim Thornton (musician, born 1988), English jazz double bassist, leader of Tim Thornton Quartet
