= General Thornton =

General Thornton may refer to:

- Charles Wade Thornton (1764–1854), British Army lieutenant general
- Leonard Thornton (1916–1999), New Zealand Army lieutenant general
- William Thornton (British Army officer) (1779–1840), British Army lieutenant general

== See also ==
- Attorney General Thornton (disambiguation)
