= Harry Thornton =

Harry Thornton may refer to:

- Harry I. Thornton, US politician
- Harry Thornton, character in Scarecrow and Mrs. King
- Dick Thornton (American football), real name Harry Thornton, American football player
- Harry Thornton, in 1873 High Sheriff of Bedfordshire

== See also ==
- Henry Thornton (disambiguation)
- Harold Thornton, Australian painter
