= Justice Thornton =

Justice Thornton or Judge Thornton or variation, may refer to:

- Anthony Thornton (politician) (1814–1904), associate justice of the Illinois Supreme Court
- James D. Thornton (1823–1902), associate justice of the Supreme Court of California
- Ray Thornton (1928–2016), associate justice of the Arkansas Supreme Court
- T. Eugene Thornton (1911–1967), associate justice of the Iowa Supreme Court

== See also ==
- Thornton (surname)
- Judge Thornton (disambiguation)
- Thornton (disambiguation)
