= Ron Thornton =

Ron Thornton may refer to:

- Ron Thornton (visual effects designer) (1957–2016), British-American visual effects designer
- Ron Thornton (Australian footballer), (born 1961), Australian rules footballer for Richmond
- Ron Thornton (rugby league), Australian rugby league footballer for Canterbury-Bankstown
