= Senator Thornton (disambiguation) =

John Thornton (1846–1917) was a U.S. Senator from Louisiana from 1910 to 1915. Senator Thornton may also refer to:

- Ant Thornton (fl. 2020s), New Mexico State Senate
- Daniel I. J. Thornton (1911–1976), Colorado State Senate
- David F. Thornton (1924–2008), Virginia State Senate
- Harry I. Thornton (1834–1895), California State Senate
- J. Lyndon Thornton (1886–1953), Nebraska State Senate
- John R. Thornton (Arkansas politician) (1840–1910), Arkansas State Senate
- R. Ewell Thornton (1865–1928), Virginia State Senate
- William L. Thornton (1844–1915), New York State Senate
