= Frank Thornton (disambiguation) =

Frank Thornton (1921–2013) was an English actor. Frank Thornton may also refer to:

- Frank Thornton (Irish republican) (1891–1965)
- Frank Thornton (Savoyard) (1845–1918), English actor, singer, comedian, and producer
- Frank Thornton (cricketer) (1898–1987), English cricketer
