= Ken Miller (American football) =

American gridiron football player (born 1958)

No. 7, 21
- Position: Cornerback

Personal information
- Born: June 24, 1958 (age 68); Pine Bluff, Arkansas, U.S.
- Listed height: 6 ft 0 in (1.83 m)
- Listed weight: 185 lb (84 kg)

Career information
- High school: Beecher High School (MI)
- College: Eastern Michigan
- NFL draft: 1981: 7th round, 173rd overall pick

Career history
- Dallas Cowboys (1981)*; Montreal Alouettes (1981); Montreal Concordes (1982); Ottawa Rough Riders (1983–1984); Chicago Bears (1985)*; Calgary Stampeders (1985–1986)
- * Offseason or practice squad member only

Kenneth Edward Miller (born June 24, 1958) is an American former professional football cornerback in the Canadian Football League (CFL) for the Montreal Alouettes, Montreal Concordes, Ottawa Rough Riders and Calgary Stampeders. He played college football at Eastern Michigan University.

== Early life ==
Miller attended Beecher High School, where he practiced football and track & field.

He accepted a football scholarship from Eastern Michigan University, where he became a two-year starter at cornerback. As a senior, he only played in four games because of an ankle injury. He registered one interception and returned 26 kickoffs for a 20.3-yard average in his college career.

== Professional career ==
=== Dallas Cowboys ===
Miller was selected by the Dallas Cowboys in the seventh round (173rd overall) of the 1981 NFL draft. He was limited with a back injury and was waived on August 25.

=== Montreal Alouettes / Concordes ===
In September 1981, he signed with the Montreal Alouettes of the Canadian Football League. He played in three games during the season. In 1982, he returned to the renamed Concordes and played in 12 games as a starter at cornerback.

=== Ottawa Rough Riders ===
In March 1983, he was signed by the Ottawa Rough Riders of the Canadian Football League and registered two interceptions. In 1984, he was a starter at cornerback and recorded a career-high four interceptions.

=== Chicago Bears ===
In 1985, he was signed as a free agent by the Chicago Bears. He was limited with a groin injury and was released on August 12.

=== Calgary Stampeders ===
In August 1985, he signed with the Calgary Stampeders of the Canadian Football League.
