= 58th Alabama Infantry Regiment =

Infantry regiment of the Confederate States Army

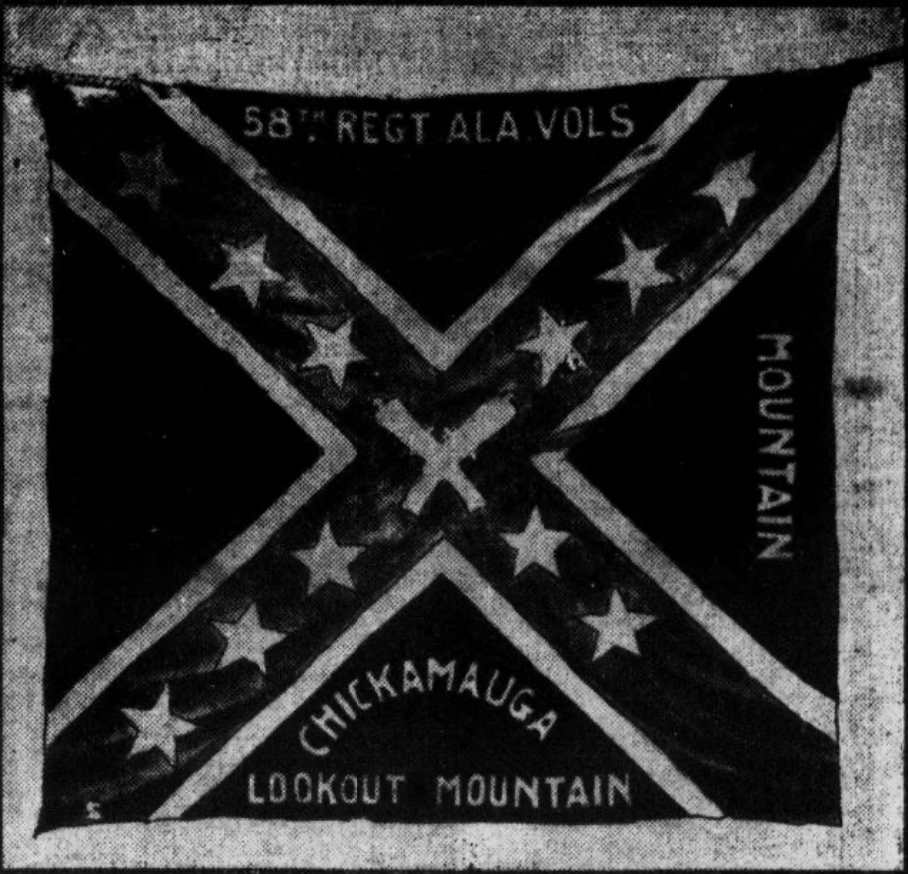
- Regimental Flag
- Active: July 25, 1863, to November 23, 1863
- Country: Confederate States of America
- Allegiance: CSA
- Branch: Infantry
- Engagements: Chickamauga

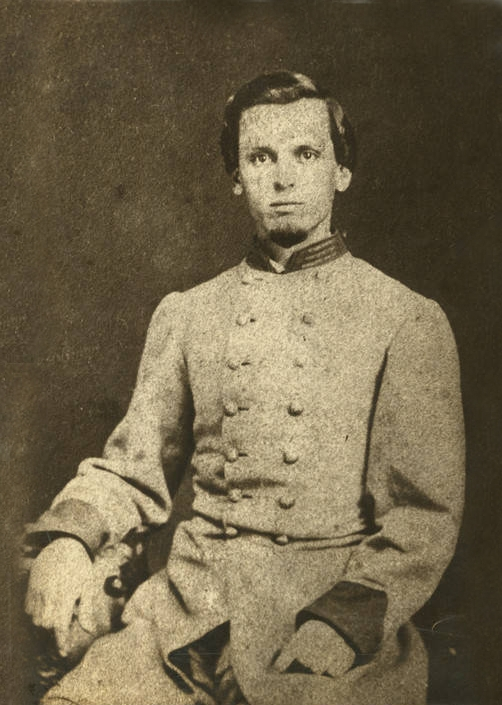
Capt. Edward Crenshaw, Company B, 58th Alabama Infantry

The 58th Alabama Infantry Regiment was an infantry regiment that served in the Confederate Army during the American Civil War.

== Service ==
Increasing the 9th Battalion Alabama Infantry to ten companies by addition of Capt. John A. Avirett's "St. Clair Sharpshooters" and Capt. Samuel D. Oliver's Co. "E", 2nd Battalion Georgia Sharpshooters, the Confederate States War Department announced the 58th Alabama Infantry Regiment on August 13, 1863 (S.O. 192, A.& I.G.O). The official date is usually cited as July 25, 1863, the day that Secretary of War James Seddon initialed the proposal to organize this regiment

Companies and their captains -

“A” of St. Clair County, Alabama, "Springville Volunteers”, Capt. George S. Markham,
“B” of Fayette County, Alabama, Capt. Edward Crenshaw,
“C” of Jefferson County, Alabama and St. Clair County, Alabama, Capt. Wayne E. Lee,
“D” of St. Clair County, Alabama, Capt. William M. Inzer,
“E” of Butler County, Alabama, “Ben Edwards Grays”, Capt. Gilbert G. Holland,
“F” of Calhoun County, Alabama, Capt. Samuel D. McClellen,
“G” of St. Clair County, Alabama, “Saint Clair Greys”, Capt. Sidney F. Lister,
“H” of Dallas County, Alabama, Capt. Calvin L. Harrell,
“I” of St. Clair County, Alabama, “Saint Clair Sharpshooters”, Capt. John A. Avirett, Jr.,
“K” of Autauga County, Alabama and Montgomery County, Alabama, Capt. Samuel D. Oliver.

On November 23, 1863, this regiment and the 32nd Regiment Alabama Infantry were consolidated to form the 32nd and 58th (Consolidated) Alabama Infantry Regiment.

== Total strength and casualties ==
Battle of Chickamauga, Georgia, September 18–20, 1863.

September 18, 1863 - 34 officers, 253 enlisted men. 1 killed.
September 19, 1863 - 34 officers, 250 enlisted men. 3 killed, 58 wounded.
September 20, 1863 - 29 officers, 201 enlisted men. 21 killed, 66 wounded.
Total loss - 25 killed, 124 wounded (52% casualties).

Field and staff officers present -

Col. Bush Jones, commanding regiment
Lt. Col. John W. Inzer, slightly wounded September 19
Major Harry I. Thornton, wounded September 19
1st Lt. and Adjutant Robert T. Harris, wounded September 19
Asst. Surgeon Robert J. Turner, wounded September 19

Company commanders -

"A", 2nd Lt. A. Sidney Hinton,
"B", Capt. Edward Crenshaw, wounded September 20,
"C", Capt. Wayne E. Lee,
"D", 1st Lt. James F. Stone,
"E", Capt. Gilbert G. Holland, wounded September 20,
"F", Capt. Samuel D. McClellen, wounded September 19, succeeded by 1st Lt. John F. McClellen,
"G", 1st Lt. Almeth B. Vandergrift,
"H", Capt. Calvin L. Harrell, wounded September 20,
"I", Capt. John A. Avirett, Jr., slightly wounded September 20,
"K", 2nd Lt. William P. Mills, wounded September 20, succeeded by 2nd Lt. Albert T. Goodwyn.

== Field officers ==
- Colonel Bush Jones, appointed August 12, 1863, to rank July 25, 1863; formerly lieutenant colonel, 9th Alabama Infantry Battalion.
- Lieutenant Colonel John Washington Inzer, appointed August 12, 1863, to rank July 25, 1863; formerly major, 9th Alabama Infantry Battalion. Wounded at Chickamauga, Georgia, September 19, 1863. Wounded and captured at Missionary Ridge, Tennessee, November 25, 1863. Released at Johnson's Island, Ohio, June 27, 1865.
- Major Harry I. Thornton, appointed August 12, 1863, to rank July 25, 1863; formerly captain and assistant adjutant general (A.A.G.) on the staff of General Braxton Bragg. Wounded at Chickamauga, Georgia, September 19, 1863; Resaca, Georgia, May [15,] 1864, and Atlanta, Georgia, July [22,] 1864. Paroled at Meridian, Mississippi, May 10, 1865.

== See also ==
- List of Confederate units from Alabama
