= Thomas Glazier =

Thomas Glazier of Oxford (fl. 1386–1427) was a master glazier active in England during the late 14th and early 15th century; he is one of the earliest identifiable stained glass artists, and is considered a leading proponent of the International Gothic style.

== Biography, works ==
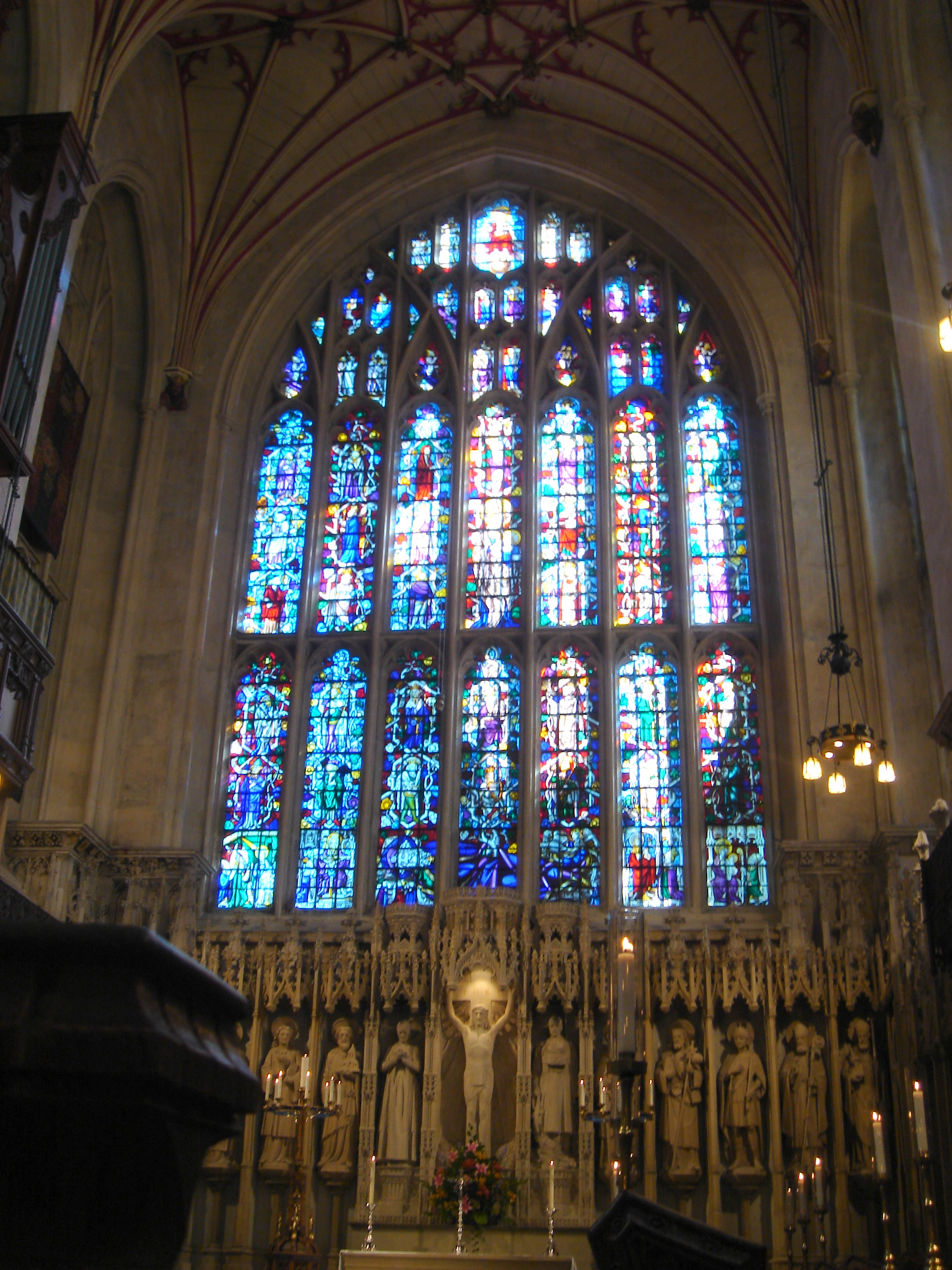
The East Window of Winchester College Chapel. The glass largely dates from an 1820s restoration, but is a fairly accurate copy of Glazier's original window.

Glazier's workshops were based in Oxford, and he was clearly an important figure in the town; he is recorded in New College's Steward's Book as being regularly invited to dine with the Warden and Fellows. Although we have some record of his professional activities (and appearance; see below) almost nothing is known of his personal life, other than that he was married.

Glazier is particularly notable for his early adoption of elements of the emerging International Gothic style in his work: he may have been influenced by his contacts with European artists through William of Wykeham and his circle. His work is characterised by sophisticated draughtsmanship and placement of figures, and also by its remarkable stylistic development, indicating that such artists were open to absorbing new ideas during the course of their careers. Along with the work of John Thornton of Coventry, Glazier's style was highly influential. It is possible that Robert Lyen, who made windows for Exeter Cathedral, was his apprentice.

Glazier's work survives in the chapels of New College, Oxford and of Winchester College. The latter scheme contains an 1822 copy of a self-portrait included in the original east window: this depicts him kneeling in prayer, wearing a long gown and with a short, forked beard of the sort fashionable in the late 14th century. There is a panel probably executed by him in the church of Thenford, Northamptonshire, as well as windows in Winchester Cathedral and the chapel of Merton College, Oxford.
