= 2019 MotoAmerica Superstock 1000 Championship =

The 2019 MotoAmerica Superstock Championship season was 5th season of the Stock 1000 class since the renaming of the series to MotoAmerica. The defending champion was Andrew Lee who took his first Stock 1000 title during the 2018 season.

== Calendar and results ==
Round	Circuit	Date	Race 1 Winner	Race 2 Winner
1	(Georgia (U.S. state)) Road Atlanta	April 5–7	(United States) Andrew Lee	(No event)
	(Texas) Circuit of the Americas	April 12–14	(No event)	(No event)
2	Virginia International Raceway	May 3–5	(United States) Michael Gilbert	(No event)
3	(Wisconsin) Road America	May 31-June 2	(United States) Geoff May	(United States) Stefano Mesa
4	Utah Motorsports Campus	June 14–16	(United States) Andrew Lee	(No event)
5	(California) Laguna Seca	July 12–14	(United States) Andrew Lee	(No event)
6	(California) Sonoma Raceway	August 9–11	(United States) Andrew Lee	(No event)
7	(Pennsylvania) Pittsburgh International Race Complex	August 23–25	(United States) Andrew Lee	(No event)
8	New Jersey Motorsports Park	September 6–8	(United States) Andrew Lee	(No event)
9	(Alabama) Barber Motorsports Park	September 20–22	(United States) Andrew Lee	(United States) Andrew Lee

== Teams and riders ==
2020 Entry List
Team	Constructor	No.	Rider	Rounds
AGS Racing	Yamaha	44	(Guatemala) Mauricio Roque	1, 9
ADR Motorsports	Kawasaki	912	(United States) Brad Burns	7
AGV Sport/MonkeyMoto	Yamaha	921	(United Kingdom) Steven Shakespeare	4, 5, 7–9
Altus Motorsports	Suzuki	72	(United States) Miles Thornton	All
Ameris Bank	Kawasaki	99	(United States) Geoff May	3–7, 9
APRacing62/Mustang CAT/Mustang Rental Services	Kawasaki	629	(United States) Alan Phillips	9
Babuska Racing	Kawasaki	16	(United States) Frank Babuska Jr	8
Blackhawk Racing	Kawasaki	491	(United States) Bryan Land	2
Disrupt Racing	Kawasaki	792	(United States) Tony Storniolo	3
Double A Racing	Aprilia	312	(United States) Aaron Ascher	5, 6
DougieFresh Racing	Kawasaki	269	(United States) Doug Frenchak	5
Dustin Dominguez Racing	Kawasaki	68	(United States) Dustin Dominguez	1
EDR Performance/DiBrino Racing	Yamaha	62	(United States) Andy DiBrino	5
EFC SM Sports	Aprilia	182	(Canada) Samuel Guerin	8
FLY Racing ADR Motorsports	Kawasaki	505	(United States) Nicholas Ciling	5
FLY Racing ADR Motorsports	Kawasaki	757	(United Kingdom) Bradley Ward	All
Franklin Armory/Graves Kawasaki	Kawasaki	1	(United States) Andrew Lee	All
Heflin Racing	Yamaha	211	(United States) Corey Heflin	1–3, 5–9
John Dunham Racing	Yamaha	816	(United States) John Dunham	1, 2, 9
Jutras Racing	BMW	171	(United States) Louis Jutras	5
K Moto Racing	Kawasaki	151	(United States) Jeremy Kolewski	3, 7, 9
Ken Pfister Racing	Kawasaki	333	(United States) Ken Pfister	4–6
Khalil Racing International	Yamaha	808	(United States) Tawfik Khalil	1
Legacy Dental	Yamaha	31	(United States) Jeffrey Purk	2–7, 9
M4 ECSTAR Suzuki	Suzuki	49	(Bolivia) Felipe MacLean	2, 3, 8
M4 ECSTAR Suzuki	Suzuki	501	(United States) Daniel Mole	5
Mantega Racing	Kawasaki	73	(Brazil) Sebastiao Ferreira	4–6
Mesa 37 Racing	Kawasaki	37	(United States) Stefano Mesa	All
MFC Racing	Suzuki	513	(United States) Michael Jensen	3, 7, 9
MOBI BMW Racing	BMW	271	(United States) Greg Arnold	1
MotoRad Racing	BMW	115	(United States) Greg Ludt	2
MP13 Racing	Yamaha	13	(United States) Melissa Paris	1, 3, 5
NapaValleyRacing.com	Yamaha	26	(United States) Roi Holster	All
Outlaw Racing	Kawasaki	161	(Israel) Sahar Zvik	4–6
Red Lobo Racing	Kawasaki	222	(United States) Manuel Segura	1, 3–9
Ride HVMC Freeman Racing	Kawasaki	23	(United States) Corey Alexander	3, 7, 8
RN93 Racing	Yamaha	193	(United States) Rhett Norman	1–4, 9
Ryan Jones Racing	BMW	683	(United States) Ryan Jones	1, 2, 8
Schumacher Racing	Yamaha	920	(United States) Zachary Schumacher	3
Sean Thomas Racing	Suzuki	152	(United States) Sean Thomas	3–5
Shane Hobgood Racing	Kawasaki	91	(United States) Shane Hobgood	1–3, 6–9
She’z Racing	Yamaha	493	(United States) Shelina Moreda	5, 6
SRT	Yamaha	29	(United States) Garrick Schneiderman	2, 3
Superbike Underground	Yamaha	291	(Canada) Scott Decker	4
Synergy Audio Video	BMW	369	(United States) Aaron Risinger	3
Team JaS Racing	Aprilia	689	(United States) Sherwick Min	4, 6
Team Kok	Kawasaki	228	(United States) Samuel Kok	3
Team Lewin Estates	Yamaha	48	(United States) Chad Lewin	1–4
Team Motoroso.com	Kawasaki	765	(United States) George Myshlyayev	5, 6
Team Norris Racing	Kawasaki	55	(United States) Michael Gilbert	1–7, 9
Team19	Kawasaki	19	(United States) Wyatt Farris	3, 4, 6
TSE Racing	BMW	119	(Germany) Stefan Dolipski	3
Tuned Racing	Yamaha	187	(Canada) Justin Delong	4, 5
Ugly Dog Racing	Kawasaki	129	(United States) Jim Wilson	4
Vic Fasola Racing	Yamaha	22	(United States) Ashton Yates	6–9
Vic Fasola Racing	Yamaha	193	(United States) Rhett Norman	1–4, 9
Weir Everywhere Racing	BMW	24	(United States) Travis Wyman	1–7

== Championship standings ==
=== Riders' championship ===
Scoring system

Points are awarded to the top fifteen finishers. A rider has to finish the race to earn points.

Position	1st	2nd	3rd	4th	5th	6th	7th	8th	9th	10th	11th	12th	13th	14th	15th
Points	25	20	16	13	11	10	9	8	7	6	5	4	3	2	1

Pos	Rider	Bike	RAT (Georgia (U.S. state))	VIR (Virginia)	RAM (Wisconsin)		UMC (Utah)	MON (California)	SON (California)	PIT (Pennsylvania)	NJE (New Jersey)	BAR (Alabama)		Pts
Pos	Rider	Bike	R1	R1	R1	R2	R1	R1	R1	R1	R1	R1	R2	Pts
1	(United States) Andrew Lee	Kawasaki	1	4	3	2	1	1	1	1	1	1	1	249
2	(United States) Stefano Mesa	Kawasaki	3	2	2	1	3	3	4	Ret	3	3	3	174
3	(United States) Michael Gilbert	Kawasaki	2	1	5	Ret	5	5	2	Ret		2	2	138
4	(United States) Geoff May	Kawasaki			1	Ret	2	2	3	Ret		Ret	4	94
5	(United States) Miles Thornton	Suzuki	Ret	Ret	7	4	6	8	8	4	6	5	5	93
6	(United States) Travis Wyman	BMW	4	3	4	Ret	4	4	5	5				90
7	(United States) Ashton Yates	Yamaha							7	2	5	4	6	63
8	(United States) Corey Alexander	Kawasaki			6	3				3	2			62
9	(United Kingdom) Bradley Ward	Kawasaki	8	6	13	Ret	10	Ret	10	6	Ret	6	7	62
10	(United States) Rhett Norman	Yamaha	7	7	10	6	Ret					8	9	49
11	(United States) Jeffrey Purk	Yamaha		12	14	Ret	13	13	14	9		10	12	31
12	(United States) Corey Heflin	Yamaha	9	14	25	12		17	16	8	9	DNS	13	31
13	(United States) Manuel Segura	Kawasaki	15		24	17	14	20	13	11	8	11	10	30
14	(Brazil) Sebastiao Ferreira	Kawasaki					9	7	6					26
15	(United States) John Dunham	Yamaha	10	10								7	11	26
16	(United States) Roi Holster	Yamaha	12	13	20	15	15	16	12	12	10	16	19	23
17	(United States) Garrick Schneiderman	Yamaha		11	9	7								21
18	(United States) Chad Lewin	Yamaha	5	Ret	Ret	DNS	7							20
19	(United States) Wyatt Farris	Kawasaki			8	Ret	8		Ret					16
20	(United States) Aaron Risinger	BMW			11	5								16
21	(Bolivia) Felipe MacLean	Suzuki		Ret	15	10					7			16
22	(United States) Alan Phillips	Kawasaki										9	8	15
23	(United States) Jeremy Kolewski	Kawasaki			22	14				10		12	14	14
24	(United States) Melissa Paris	Yamaha	11		17	9		14						14
25	(United States) Frank Babuska Jr	Kawasaki									4			13
26	(United States) George Myshlyayev	Kawasaki						10	9					13
27	(United States) Zachary Schumacher	Yamaha			12	8								12
28	(United States) Ryan Jones	BMW	DNS	5							DNS			11
29	(United States) Shane Hobgood	Kawasaki	14	15	26	19			Ret	13	11	17	18	11
30	(United States) Andy DiBrino	Yamaha						6						10
31	(United States) Dustin Dominguez	Kawasaki	6											10
32	(United States) Brad Burns	Kawasaki								7				9
33	(United States) Sean Thomas	Suzuki			18	13	11	15						9
34	(United States) Bryan Land	Kawasaki		8										8
35	(United States) Doug Frenchak	Kawasaki						9						7
36	(United States) Greg Ludt	BMW		9										7
37	(Guatemala) Mauricio Roque	Yamaha	13									13	15	7
38	(Israel) Sahar Zvik	Kawasaki					Ret	11	15					6
39	(United States) Aaron Ascher	Aprilia						Ret	11					5
40	(United States) Tony Storniolo	Kawasaki			16	11								5
41	(United States) Nicholas Ciling	Kawasaki						12						4
42	(Canada) Scott Decker	Yamaha					12							4
43	(United States) Michael Jensen	Suzuki			19	18				14		14	17	4
44	(United Kingdom) Steven Shakespeare	Yamaha					Ret	18		Ret	Ret	15	16	1
45	(Canada) Samuel Guerin	Aprilia									DNS			0
46	(United States) Louis Jutras	BMW						Ret						0
47	(United States) Jim Wilson	Kawasaki					DNS							0
48	(United States) Samuel Kok	Kawasaki			21	Ret								0
49	(Germany) Stefan Dolipski	BMW				16								0
50	(United States) Tawfik Khalil	Yamaha	16											0
51	(United States) Sherwick Min	Aprilia					16		17					0
52	(United States) Greg Arnold	BMW	17											0
53	(United States) Shelina Moreda	Yamaha						22	18					0
54	(United States) Ken Pfister	Kawasaki					18	23	19					0
55	(Canada) Justin Delong	Yamaha					17	19						0
56	(United States) Daniel Mole	Suzuki						21						0
Pos	Rider	Bike	RAT (Georgia (U.S. state))	VIR (Virginia)	RAM (Wisconsin)		UMC (Utah)	MON (California)	SON (California)	PIT (Pennsylvania)	NJE (New Jersey)	ALA (Alabama)		Pts
