= Leon Junction, Texas =

- Unincorporated community
- Location within Texas Location within the United States
- Coordinates: 31°32′47″N 97°37′6″W
- Country: United States
- State: Texas
- County: Coryell
- Elevation: 679 ft (207 m)
- Time zone: UTC-6 (Central (CST))
  - Summer (DST): UTC-5 (CDT)
- Area code: 254
- GNIS feature ID: 1361091

Leon Junction is an unincorporated community in Coryell County, in the U.S. state of Texas. According to the Handbook of Texas, the community had a population of 25 in 2000. It is located within the Killeen-Temple-Fort Hood metropolitan area.

== Education ==
In 1904, New Olive School had 75 students and two teachers. Today, the community is served by the Gatesville Independent School District.

== Notable person ==
Jack Thornton, basketball player.
