= Beecher High School (Michigan) =

- Mount Morris, Michigan; United States

Information
- School district: Beecher Community School District
- Grades: 9–12
- Color
- Nickname: Buccaneers
- Website: www.beecherschools.org/o/bhs

Beecher High School is a public high school in Mount Morris, Michigan. It is part of the Beecher Community School District.

== History ==
The original Beecher High School building suffered extensive damage during a tornado on June 8, 1953. The gymnasium was almost completely destroyed.

The original building was closed in 2004 due to budget problems. Students were then relocated to a local middle school building. After a $10 million grant was received, the original Beecher High building will be reopened in 2026. The current building will be reconverted back into a middle school.

== Notable alumni ==
- Carl Banks (born 1962), former NFL Pro Bowl linebacker.
- Duane D. Hackney, United States Air Force Pararescueman
- Javontae Hawkins (born 1993), basketball player in the Israeli Basketball Premier League
- Ken Miller (born 1958), former CFL player
- Monté Morris (born 1995), NBA player
- John Thornton, NFL player
