= Henry Thornton =

Henry Thornton is the name of:

- Henry Thornton (reformer) (1760–1815), English economist, banker, philanthropist and parliamentarian; one of the founders of the Clapham Sect
- Henry Worth Thornton (1871–1933), president of Canadian National Railway
- Henry Gerard Thornton (1892–1977), British microbiologist - see Leeuwenhoek Lecture
- Henry Thornton (cricketer) (born 1996), Australian cricketer
- Henry Thornton, Member of Parliament for Bridgwater in 1529

== See also ==
- Harry Thornton (disambiguation)
