= Thornden =

Thornden is a surname. Notable people with the surname include:

- John Thornden, English 16th-century bishop and university administrator
- Richard Thornden, 16th-century priest

== See also ==
- Thornton (surname)
