= Michael R. Thornton =

American actor and director (born 1957)

Mike Thornton
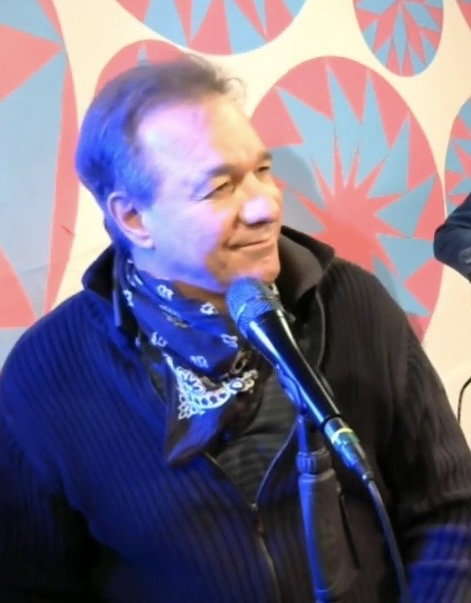
- Born: Michael R Thornton; 1957 (age 68–69); Windsor, Connecticut, United States
- Education: Hartt School; University of Hartford
- Occupations: Actor, director, producer, jazz singer
- Years active: 1979–present
- Known for: Lead performer with The Capitol Steps
- Awards: Wammie Awards

Michael R Thornton (born 1957), known professionally as Mike Thornton, is an American actor, director, producer, and jazz singer. He is best known for his role as a lead performer with The Capitol Steps, a political musical satire group based in Washington, D.C. His career has included roles in theater and television, work as a jazz vocalist, and theatrical production.

== Early life and education ==
Thornton was raised in Windsor, Connecticut, where as a teenager he and his three brothers were active in summer theater programs. After high school, Thornton attended the Hartt School at the University of Hartford, a performing arts conservatory, where he studied voice and theater under instructors including jazz saxophonist Jackie McLean and graduated in 1979. He also studied classical conducting while at Hartt.

Following his conservatory training, Thornton moved to New York City to study acting in a Meisner‑based program under acting teacher Wynn Handman as well as James Price of The Acting Studio. During this period, he served on the faculty of the University of Hartford as a voice and theatre instructor. He also performed as a vocalist with local ensembles, including singing with a jazz fusion band called Topazz, appearing as a guest soloist with the Hartford Symphony Orchestra, and gigging with jazz groups throughout New England.

== Career ==
=== Early stage and music work ===
Thornton began his professional career in 1979. At age 19, he performed on Cape Cod with Uptown Sound, a vocal group with arrangements by Ed Cerveney. In New York, he fronted his jazz quartet in clubs such as the 55 Bar and Cleopatra's Needle, while also working in theatre. He appeared Off-Broadway in productions including The Zoo Story and The Madwoman of Chaillot, and he was in the American premiere of the musical Blood Brothers. His television work included a role as Sgt. Steve Nagel in an episode of the NBC series Homicide: Life on the Street.

In the early 1990s, Thornton also managed and produced theatrical shows. In North Adams, Massachusetts, he operated the Mohawk Theater, where he and his first wife and co-producer Maria Watson, booked national touring artists and established a resident company that produced musicals and plays. He also created, wrote, and starred in a live variety show, The 1990's Radio Hour – and a Half, which was recorded before a live audience and broadcast on public radio station WAMC. By the mid‑1990s, Thornton had served as the artistic director of several regional theaters, including the Mohawk Theatre in the Berkshires, the Millbrook Playhouse in Pennsylvania, and the Impala Theatre Company in Arlington, Virginia, as well as of a World War II‑themed musical revue called Swing Time: The Musical in Washington, D.C. This latter production, a 1940s‑style radio show, was co‑created and produced by Thornton and his wife, Cecilia Fex, an attorney and former partner with Ackerson Kauffman Fex, PC.

=== The Capitol Steps ===
In 1995, Thornton joined the cast of the comedy Shear Madness for a two‑year run at the John F. Kennedy Center for the Performing Arts. In 1997, he became a member of The Capitol Steps. As one of the troupe's lead performers, he became known for his impersonations of U.S. presidents from Ronald Reagan to Donald Trump. During his twenty‑four years with the group, Thornton toured 49 of the 50 states (Hawaii) and appeared in the ensemble's "Politics Takes a Holiday" specials on NPR. Thornton appeared in venues ranging from intimate theaters to large concert halls, including regular sold‑out holiday shows at Harvard University’s Sanders Theatre in Cambridge, Massachusetts, and performances for 4,000 people at the Chautauqua Institution Amphitheater in New York. The Capitol Steps dissolved in early 2021 due to the impact of the COVID-19 pandemic on live performances. Thornton also founded the Mike Thornton Agency, LLC, a production company that presented and promoted the troupe's national tours from 2010 to 2021.

=== Jazz and later projects ===
Parallel to his theater career, Thornton has performed as a jazz singer. In Washington since the mid‑1990s, he has appeared at major jazz venues such as Blues Alley, Twins Jazz, and Bohemian Caverns, often fronting the Mike Thornton Jazz Collective. He has released two studio albums: Step Back (2008) and Homeward (2018). He also recorded a live album, Top Standards.

After the Capitol Steps disbanded, Thornton turned his focus to new theatrical projects and community arts. Having often performed in the Chautauqua region of western New York with the Capitol Steps, he grew fond of the area and, during the pandemic, decided to establish a second home there. In 2024, Thornton relocated part‑time to the city of Jamestown, New York, with the goal of helping revitalize its local arts scene. He launched a production venture called MTA Presents, through which he produced a live radio‑play adaptation of It's a Wonderful Life at Jamestown's Robert H. Jackson Center in December 2024. In this holiday show, Thornton served as producer, director and actor, assembling a cast of Broadway and regional performers to reenact the Frank Capra classic as a 1940s radio broadcast on stage.

== Personal life ==
Thornton is married to retired attorney Cecilia Fex and has two daughters. The couple resides in Washington, D.C., and Chautauqua County, New York.

== Awards and recognition ==
As a member of The Capitol Steps, Thornton was a recipient of multiple Washington Area Music Association (Wammie) Awards for outstanding cabaret/musical theater performance. The troupe was also nominated for a Drama Desk Award for outstanding lyrics.

Thornton's work as a jazz vocalist has received critical notice. Reviewing his album Step Back, The Washington Post noted his "harmonic assurance" and "winning versatility," placing his style "somewhere between Mark Murphy and Steve Tyrell." Cadence commented on his creative phrasing and "vibrant expression."
