= Miles Thornton =

American motorcycle racer (born 1994)

- Nationality: American
- Born: April 2, 1994 (age 32); Columbus, Georgia, United States
- Current team: CTR Racing
- Bike number: 72

Miles Thornton (born April 2, 1994) is a Grand Prix motorcycle racer from United States. He races in the AMA Pro Supersport Championship for CTR Racing aboard a Yamaha YZF-R6.

== Career statistics ==
=== By season ===
Season	Class	Motorcycle	Team	Number	Race	Win	Podium	Pole	FLap	Pts	Plcd
2009	125cc	Aprilia	Veloce Racing	75	1	0	0	0	0	0	NC
Total					1	0	0	0	0	0	

=== Races by year ===
Year	Class	Bike	1	2	3	4	5	6	7	8	9	10	11	12	13	14	15	16	Pos	Points
2009	125cc	Aprilia	QAT	JPN	SPA	FRA	ITA	CAT	NED	GER	GBR	CZE	INP; Ret	RSM	POR	AUS	MAL	VAL	NC	0

=== MotoAmerica Superstock 1000 Championship ===
==== Races by year ====
Year	Class	Team	1	2	3		4	5	6	7	8	9		Pos	Pts
Year	Class	Team	R1	R1	R1	R2	R1	R1	R1	R1	R1	R1	R2	Pos	Pts
2019	Superstock 1000	Suzuki	ATL; Ret	VIR; Ret	RAM; 7	RAM; 4	UMC; 6	MON; 8	SON; 8	PIT; 4	NJR; 6	ALA; 5	ALA; 5	5th	93
