= Joel Thornton =

American atmospheric chemist

Joel Andrew Thornton is an American atmospheric chemist. He has been a faculty member at the University of Washington since 2004, where he has served as dean of the College of the Environment since 2026. Thornton won a National Science Foundation CAREER Award in 2009 and was a Highly Cited Researcher in cross-field research in 2019 and the geosciences in 2020.

Thornton attended Dartmouth College, from which he graduated in 1996 with a B.A. degree in chemistry. He received a Ph.D. in chemistry from the University of California, Berkeley, in 2002 and was a postdoctoral research fellow at the University of Toronto from 2002 to 2004.

Joining the University of Washington's Department of Atmospheric Sciences in 2004, Thornton was an assistant professor until 2009 and associate professor until 2015. He has also been an adjunct member of the chemistry department since 2009. His lab researches tropospheric oxidation chemistry, including the sources and effects of aerosol particles. In 2017, his research found that lightning density doubles above oceanic shipping lanes.

In 2015, Thornton became a full professor of atmospheric and climate science. He became the chair of the Department of Atmospheric and Climate Science in 2022 before serving as interim dean of the university's College of the Environment from 2025 to 2026; he was named Maggie Walker Dean of the college in 2026.
