= Attorney General Thornton =

Attorney General Thornton may refer to:

- Robert Y. Thornton (1910–2003), Attorney General of Oregon
- Ray Thornton (1928–2016), Attorney General of Arkansas
