= Sherry Thornton =

American biologist

- Education: Ball State University (BS); University of Cincinnati College of Medicine (PhD)
- Occupation: Biologist

Sherry L. Thornton is an American biologist. She is a field service associate professor at University of Cincinnati in the department of pediatrics. Thornton is the director of the Research Flow Cytometry Core.

== Education ==
Thornton completed a Bachelor of Science at Ball State University in 1990. In 1997, she earned a Doctor of Philosophy in developmental biology at the University of Cincinnati College of Medicine. Her dissertation was titled "Androgen responsiveness of mouse kidney beta-glucuronidase requires 5'-flanking and intragenic Gus-s sequences." Her doctoral advisor was Roger Ganschow. She completed postdoctoral studies in the laboratory of Raphael Hirsch in the division of rheumatology at Cincinnati Children's Hospital Medical Center.

== Career ==
Thornton joined the faculty in the division of rheumatology at Cincinnati Children's Hospital in 2002. In 2008, she became the director of the Research Flow Cytometry Core. Thornton is a field service associate professor at University of Cincinnati in the department of pediatrics.

She serves a mentor and is the director of the Summer Undergraduate Research Fellowship program at Cincinnati Children's Hospital.

=== Research ===
Thornton analyzes genes effecting angiogenesis and hematopoietic processes and their relation to pathogenesis of arthritic disease in animal models. She also researches single cell gene expression in Juvenile Idiopathic Arthritis cell types.
