= Elizabeth Thornton (English writer) =

British novelist (1787–1863)

- Born: July 1787
- Died: July 16, 1863 (aged 75–76); Clapham, England
- Occupation: Novelist
- Spouse: John Thorton (m. 1807)
- Children: 10

Elizabeth Thornton (July 1787 – July 16, 1863) was a British novelist.

Elizabeth Thornton was baptized on 12 July 1787 in Little Dunham, Norfolk. She was the second daughter of Edward Parry, chairman of the East India Company, and Emilia Vansittart, daughter of Henry Vansittart, the Governor of Bengal. In 1807, she married John Thornton, a civil servant and son of Samuel Thornton, director of the Bank of England. They would have six sons and four daughters. In 1827, they moved to The Terrace on Clapham High Street, where they lived until 1861. One local historian noted that her "beauty was so notorious that she was called the 'Terrace Queen' for many years."

Thornton turned to writing at the age of 55. In 1842, she published a narrative poem, Lady Alice, and her first novel, The Marchioness. Her second novel, Truth and Falsehood, was published in 1847. It had been originally serialized in Tait's Edinburgh Magazine until it was abruptly replaced the previous year. While her works received some positive reviews, it is unclear how popular they were. One observer noted that "no copies seem to exist outside the British Museum Library".

Elizabeth Thornton died on 16 July 1863 in Clapham.

== Bibliography ==
- Lady Alice: A Ballad Romance. London: 1842.
- The Marchioness: A Strange but True Tale. 2 vol. London: Simpkin, 1842.
- Truth and Falsehood: A Romance. 3 vol. London: Chapman and Hall, 1847.
