= Patricia H. Thornton =

American organizational theorist

Patricia H. Thornton is an American organizational theorist, and Grand Challenge Initiative Professor of Sociology and Entrepreneurship at Texas A&M University as well as Adjunct Associate Professor of Business Administration at the Fuqua School of Business at Duke University. She is known for her work on "the sociology of entrepreneurship" and "the Institutional Logics Perspective."

== Life and work ==
Thornton obtained her PhD in sociology in 1993 at Stanford University. Her committee was W. Richard Scott, John Meyer, Jeffrey Pfeffer, and Nancy Tuma, and her dissertation was "Acquisition Growth of College Publishing, 1958-1990." One of her first publications to come out of her dissertation research was "The problem of boundaries in contemporary research on organizations," co-authored with Nancy Tuma and which won the best paper award from the Organization and Management Theory Division of the Academy of Management.

After graduation Thornton was visiting scholar in Organizational Behavior at INSEAD, and visiting scholar in Management Science and Engineering at Stanford University. At Duke University Fuqua School of Business she is appointed adjunct professor and is affiliated with its Center for Entrepreneurship and Innovation. She was also visiting associate professor at Stanford University's Department of Sociology. In 2015 Thornton became Grand Challenge Initiative Professor of Sociology and Entrepreneurship at Texas A&M University where she currently teaches "The Social Science of Entrepreneurship."

Thornton's research interests are in the fields of "organization theory, innovation and entrepreneurship, and the social and cultural factors promoting entrepreneurship... [specifically] in developing the Action Learning Approach for teaching entrepreneurship using live business plans, entrepreneurs, and investors."

== Selected publications ==
- Thornton, Patricia H., William Ocasio, and Michael Lounsbury. The institutional logics perspective: A new approach to culture, structure, and process. Oxford University Press, 2012.

Articles, a selection:

- Thornton, Patricia H. "The sociology of entrepreneurship." Annual Review of Sociology (1999): 19–46.
- Thornton, Patricia H., and William Ocasio. "Institutional logics and the historical contingency of power in organizations: Executive succession in the higher education publishing industry, 1958-1990 1." American journal of Sociology 105.3 (1999): 801–843.
- Thornton, Patricia H., and William Ocasio. "Institutional logics." The Sage handbook of organizational institutionalism 840 (2008): 99–128.
