= Robert H. Jackson Center =

Coordinates: 42.0983°N 79.23764°W

The Robert H. Jackson Center
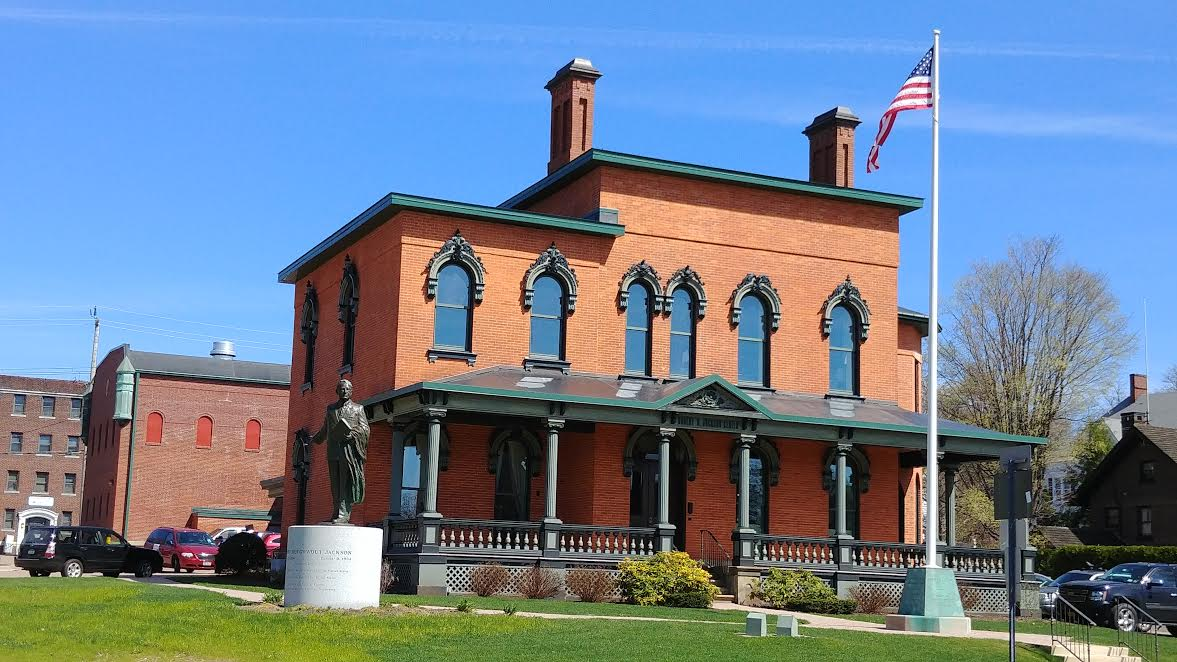
- The Robert H. Jackson Center
- Established: 2001
- Location: 305 E. 4th Street, Jamestown, New York
- Type: Historical Center
- Collections: writings, speeches and photos
- President: Kristan McMahon
- Chairperson: Leah Weinberg
- Parking: On site (no charge)
- Website: roberthjackson.org

The Robert H. Jackson Center is a historical center located in Jamestown, New York, dedicated to the life and legacy of Robert H. Jackson. The Robert H. Jackson Center was established in 2001 and dedicated on May 16, 2003. The Center's mission is "to advance public awareness and appreciation of the principles of justice and the rule of law, as embodied in the achievements and legacy of Robert H. Jackson, US Supreme Court Justice, and Chief US Prosecutor at Nuremberg."

== Local connection ==
Jackson grew up in nearby Frewsburg, New York, and practiced law for most of his professional career in Jamestown, two blocks away from the center's current location, in the historic Alonzo Kent Mansion. The Center houses exhibits dedicated to Jackson's life, the International Military Tribunal at Nuremberg (of which Jackson was the Chief US Prosecutor), and the history of Jamestown.

== Programs ==
Each summer, the Center co-sponsors lectures at the Chautauqua Institution, most notably, the annual Robert H. Jackson lecture on the Supreme Court, which is in its thirteenth year. Previous lecturers have included Tracey Meares, Laurence Tribe, Akhil Amar, Charles Fried, Pamela Karlan, Dahlia Lithwick, Jeff Shesol, Paul D. Clement, Jeffery Toobin, Seth P. Waxman, Linda Greenhouse, and Geoffrey R. Stone.

== See also ==
- Robert H. Jackson
