= Richard Thornton (swimmer) =

American swimmer (died 2024)

Biographical details
- Born: circa 1959; Alameda County, California, U.S.
- Died: January 4, 2024; Santa Cruz, California, U.S.
- Education: University of California, Berkeley

Playing career
- 1977-1980: UC Berkeley; Coached by Nort Thornton
- Positions: freestyle, butterfly

Coaching career (HC unless noted)
- 1984-2024: San Ramon Valley Aquatics

Accomplishments and honors

Awards
- 88-94 ASCAA Award of Excellence; 1994-2000 Pacific Swim. Coach of the Year

Richard Thornton (circa 1959 – January 4, 2024) was an American competition swimmer for the University of California Berkeley from 1977 to 1980, a 1980 Olympic Team member and a nationally recognized, long serving coach for the San Ramon Valley Aquatics Swim Club from 1984 to 2024.

As a Junior at Campolindo High School in Morago, California, in April 1975, he won the Alameda County Flecto Sports Award for leading Campolindo to the Foothill Athletic League Championship for the best record that season by winning three events at their meet with Acalanes High School. At the Foothill League qualifying events for the league's annual championship, he won the 200-yard freestyle in 1:47.2, the 500-yard freestyle in 4:43.4, and swam on the winning 400 free relay. In April 1977, he won the 200 butterfly with a time of 1:47.85 at the National AAU Indoor Short Course Championships in Canton, Ohio.

In 1976, he qualified for the Olympic trials in Long Beach in the 200-meter butterfly, but placed sixth in the finals with a time of 2:02.88.

== University of California ==
Thornton swam for the University of California Berkeley from 1977 to 1980, where he received All American honors twice and was a national champion. His father, who coached him in college, was International Swimming Hall of Fame Coach Nort Thornton, a highly accomplished Head Coach for the University of California Berkeley from 1974 to 2000. Richard specialized in the 100 and 200 butterfly and the 200 freestyle. He graduated Berkeley in 1980 which a Bachelor's in Physical Education, and began his coaching career after earning a master's degree at St. Mary's.

At 21, he was selected for the United States Olympic Team, but did not participate as an Olympian, as the United States had boycotted the Moscow Olympics that year due to the Soviet invasion of Afghanistan.

== Coaching ==
Thornton had a long and distinguished coaching career with the San Ramon Valley Aquatics from 1984 to 2024. He helped co-found the year round swim program in 1984, which now has a staff of several coaches, an executive board, and added a Masters Program for Adult swimmers in 2012. As of 2024, the team meets at the large San Ramon Olympic Pool and Park on Broadmoor Drive, and also the Dougherty Valley Aquatic Center, built in 2007, on Albion Drive in San Ramon. Both facilities have outdoor Olympic size pools which can be used for meets or practices.

Nationally recognized for his skills and his team's accomplishments, Thornton was a recipient of the American Swimming Coaches Association Award of Excellence from 1988 to 1994. He was also the recipient of the Pacific Swimming Coach of the Year award from 1994 to 2000.

On the international level, Thornton served as head coach for the 1995 U.S. World Championship team. In high level age group competition, he served as coach for American national and junior national teams in Paris, Japan and Brazil.

=== Outstanding swimmers coached ===
The most outstanding swimmer to come through his swim program at San Ramon was Matt Biondi, who swam for the club from 1990 to 1992. He was a U.S. Olympic team member in 1984, 1988, and 1992, and captured eight gold, two silver, and one bronze medal. Thornton also coached 2008 Olympic breaststroke swimmer for Brazil Henrique Barbosa from 2001 to 2002, and Pan American Games gold medalist in 2007, as well as 2007 Pan Am Games Gold medalist and Stanford swim team Captain Andy Grant from 2001 to 2004. He coached Stanford swimmer Pan Pacific Championships gold medalist Sarah Anderson from 1990 to 1995, and 1988 Olympic finalist for Czechoslovakia, Alex Marcek from 1990 to 1992. The club also produced a number of Olympic trail qualifiers and collegiate All Americans. Attendees at the 2004 Olympic trials included Leah Avilla, who Thornton coached from 1994 to 2005, John Dorr who Thornton coached from 1994 to 2002, and Amy Ng who Thornton coached from 1992 to 2001.

A surfing enthusiast, Thornton died after collapsing while heading to the water to surf at "The Hook", a popular surfing location near Pleasure Point in Santa Cruz, California on January 4, 2024. He had been suffering from Multiple Myloma, a blood disease. Drowning was later determined as the cause of death. He was 65.
