= Judge Thornton =

Judge Thornton may refer to:

- Michael B. Thornton (born 1954), judge of the United States Tax Court
- Thomas Patrick Thornton (1898–1985), judge of the United States District Court for the Eastern District of Michigan

== See also ==
- Justice Thornton (disambiguation)
