= Flora L. Thornton =

American actress (1913–2010)

- Born: November 1, 1913; Independence, Kansas, U.S.
- Died: May 7, 2010 (aged 96); Los Angeles, California, U.S.
- Education: Texas Tech University
- Occupations: Actress, philanthropist
- Spouses: Tex Thornton (m. 1937; died 1981) Eric Small (m. 2005)

Flora Laney Thornton (November 1, 1913 – May 7, 2010) was an American actress and philanthropist.

== Biography ==
=== Early life ===
Flora Laney was born on November 1, 1913, in Independence, Kansas. She was the daughter of Charles W. and Effie M. (Smith) Laney. She moved with her family to Fort Worth, Texas, where she attended Texas Tech University. She majored in nutrition and clothing design. She later moved to New York to study voice.

=== Career ===
She appeared in two Broadway musicals, May Wine and White Horse Inn.

=== Philanthropy ===
She served on the board of regents of Pepperdine University. She also served a seven year term at the Library of Congress Trust Fund Board. She supported the University of Southern California School of Music, the USC/Norris comprehensive cancer center, and the Library Foundation of Los Angeles. Following Thornton's contribution of $25 million to the School of Music in 1999, the USC Board of Trustees renamed the School of Music to USC Thornton School of Music. She also donated to the Keck School of Medicine of USC, Pepperdine University, the Walt Disney Concert Hall, the Los Angeles Music Center, and the Los Angeles Opera.

Her support to the Los Angeles Opera made her a life trustee and Founding Angel in 1989. She partnered with Plácido Domingo, the company's general director, to establish the Domingo-Thornton Young Artist Program. "Identifying and encouraging talented young artists with enormous potential is essential to the future of opera," Thornton said at the time. Thornton also served nine years on the board of the Santa Fe Opera. Her contribution helped organize a scholarship fund to the Music Academy of the West in Montecito.

She established the Flora L. Thornton Foundation, which supports philanthropic programs which help make local-world communities a better place to live. With her second husband, she supported the National Multiple Sclerosis Society Programs, which led to the establishment of the Eric Small Centers for Optimal Living, for people with multiple sclerosis and similar diseases.

=== Personal life ===
She married her first husband, Tex Thornton, in 1937. They were married for 44 years until his death in 1981. She remarried in 2005 to Eric Small.

=== Death ===
She died of pulmonary disease at her home in Holmby Hills on May 7, 2010. Her service was held at All Saints Church in Beverly Hills, California.
