= James Thornton (cricketer) =

English cricketer (1861–1916)

Personal information
- Full name: James Richard Thornton
- Born: 11 January 1861; Horsham, Sussex, England
- Died: 1 March 1916 (aged 55); Burgess Hill, Sussex, England
- Batting: Right-handed
- Bowling: Right-arm fast

Domestic team information
- Years: Team
- 1880–1883: Sussex

Career statistics
Competition	First-class
Matches	3
Runs scored	73
Batting average	14.60
100s/50s	0/0
Top score	29
Balls bowled	68
Wickets	1
Bowling average	42.00
5 wickets in innings	0
10 wickets in match	0
Best bowling	1/30
Catches/stumpings	2/–
- Source: Cricinfo, 17 June 2012

James Richard Thornton (11 January 1861 – 1 March 1916) was an English cricketer. Thornton was a right-handed batsman who bowled right-arm fast. He was born at Horsham, Sussex.

Thornton made three first-class appearances for Sussex. He made his debut against the touring Australians in 1880 at the County Cricket Ground, Hove, while the following season he made a second appearance against Hampshire at the same ground. His third appearance came in 1883 against the Marylebone Cricket Club at Lord's. In his three matches, he scored 73 runs at an average of 14.60, with a high score of 29. With the ball, he took a single wicket, that of Hampshire's Russell Bencraft.

He died at Burgess Hill, Sussex, on 1 March 1916.
