= John Thornton (Leicestershire cricketer) =

English cricketer (1902–1993)

Personal information
- Full name: John Arthur Curzon Thornton
- Born: 24 February 1902; Stoneygate, Leicestershire, England
- Died: November 1993 (aged 91); Cambridge, Cambridgeshire, England
- Batting: Right-handed
- Bowling: Right-arm fast-medium
- Relatives: Frank Thornton (brother)

Domestic team information
- Years: Team
- 1921: Leicestershire

Career statistics
Competition	First-class
Matches	3
Runs scored	53
Batting average	26.50
100s/50s	–/–
Top score	19*
Balls bowled	132
Wickets	1
Bowling average	72.00
5 wickets in innings	–
10 wickets in match	–
Best bowling	1/21
Catches/stumpings	–/–
- Source: Cricinfo, 26 January 2013

John Arthur Curzon Thornton (24 February 1902 – November 1993) was an English cricketer. Thornton was a right-handed batsman who bowled right-arm fast-medium. He was born at Stoneygate, Leicestershire.

Educated at Uppingham School, Thornton made his first-class debut for Leicestershire against Kent in the 1921 County Championship. He made two further first-class appearances for the county in that season's County Championship, against Warwickshire and Derbyshire. He scored 53 runs in his three matches with a high score of 19 not out, while with the ball, he took a single wicket.

He died at Cambridge, Cambridgeshire in November 1993. His brother Frank also played first-class cricket.
