= John R. Thornton (Arkansas politician) =

American politician and lawyer from Arkansas (1840–1910)

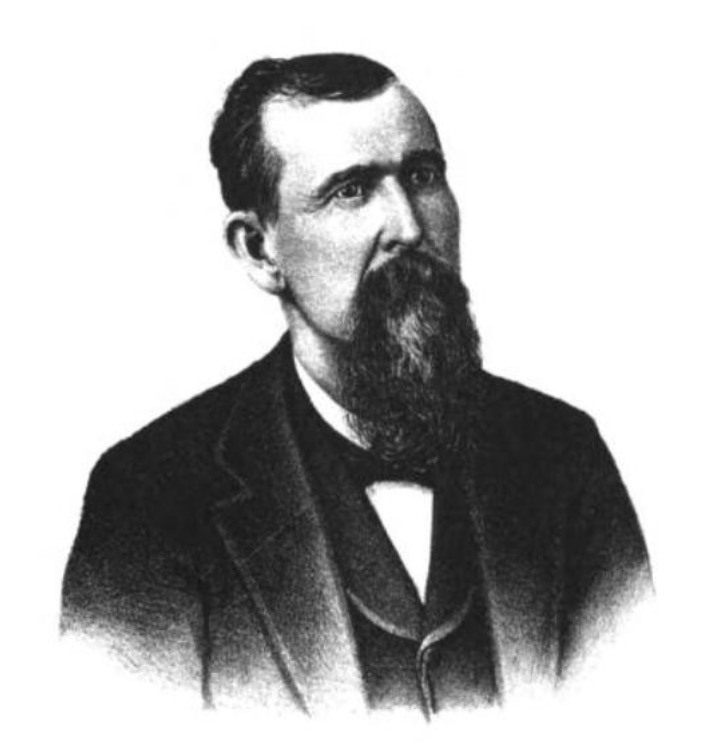

Member of the Arkansas Senate from the 19th district
- In office 1878–1886

Personal details
- Born: February 14, 1840 Chambers County, Alabama, US
- Died: December 2, 1910 (aged 70) Camden, Arkansas, US
- Party: Democratic Party
- Occupation: Politician, lawyer

Military service
- Allegiance: Confederate States of America
- Rank: Brigadier general
- Unit: 6th Arkansas Infantry Regiment (1861–1863); 12th Arkansas Infantry Regiment (1863–1865)
- Battles/wars: American Civil War; Battle of Perryville; Battle of Shiloh; Siege of Port Hudson; Battle of Franklin; Battle of Rowlett's Station

John R. Thornton (February 14, 1840 – December 2, 1910) was an American politician and lawyer. A Democrat, he was a member of the Arkansas Senate.

Born in Alabama, Thornton moved to Arkansas in his youth. He settled in Camden, where he worked as a lawyer. During the American Civil War, he served in the Confederate States Army. He later served in the Senate, representing the 19th district from 1878 to 1886.

== Early life ==
Thornton was born on February 14, 1840, in Chambers County, Alabama, the son of William S. Thornton and Nancy S. (née Fielder) Thornton. He moved to Calhoun County, Arkansas with his father in 1845. He received a limited education from local schools. However, the Arkansas Gazette claims he was born in 1845 and moved to Arkansas when two months old.

From 1854 until 1860, Thornton lived in Ouachita County, where he worked as its "internal improvement commissioner". He began reading law in 1855, and in 1858, at age 18, was admitted to the bar, prior to reaching the age requirement: 21. The Arkansas General Assembly passed a bill lowering the age minimum to 18, so he could acquire his credentials. He was also a planter.

== Military service ==
In 1861, during the American Civil War, Thornton enlisted as a private in the Confederate States Army. He was later promoted to sergeant, followed by lieutenant, then brigadier general. He fought in military campaigns in Kentucky and Missouri under William J. Hardee. He served in the 6th Arkansas Infantry Regiment until 1863, being transferred to the 12th Regiment.

Thornton fought in the Battle of Perryville; the Battle of Shiloh; the Siege of Port Hudson; the Battle of Franklin; and the Battle of Rowlett's Station. At Perryville, he was struck in the thigh by a Minié ball, leaving a permanent scar. He surrendered at Port Hudson, on July 9, 1863. He spent the remainder of the war a prisoner, being held at New Orleans, followed by at New York and at Johnson's Island. While in the military, he edited wartime newspapers, namely the Advance Guard and the Reveille, the latter in 1863.

== Career ==
Thornton was a Democrat. He was twice a delegate to the Arkansas Constitutional Conventions, once in 1868 and once prior. In 1871, he was elected judge of Calhoun County, serving one term. He was a member of the Arkansas Senate from 1878 to 1886, representing the 19th district, composed of Calhoun and Ouachita Counties. He was chairman of the Committees on Finance and on Public Printing and Memorials, and was a member of the Judiciary Committee.

As a lawyer, Thornton practiced with the firm Thornton & Smead. He was a lawyer for the Little Rock, Mississippi River and Texas Railway. From 1885 to 1889, he was Camden's receiver of the United States General Land Office, having been appointed by President Grover Cleveland, being removed from office by Benjamin Harrison and replaced by a Republican.

== Personal life and death ==
Thornton was a member of the Freemasons and the Methodist Episcopal Church, South. He abstained from alcohol consumption and gambling. On July 12, 1866, he married Sue E. Strong; they had nine children together. He died on December 2, 1910, aged 70, in Camden.
