= Robert Thornton (sailor) =

Australian competitive sailor (born 1941)

Robert Thornton (born 17 February 1941) is an Australian former sailor who competed in the 1972 Summer Olympics.
