= Tex Thornton =

American businessman (Charles Bates Thornton; 1913–1981)

- Born: Charles Bates Thornton; July 22, 1913; Goree, Texas, U.S.
- Died: November 24, 1981 (aged 68); Holmby Hills, Los Angeles, California, U.S.
- Burial place: Arlington National Cemetery
- Education: Bachelor of Commercial Science, Columbus University, 1937
- Occupations: Business executive, philanthropist
- Known for: CEO, Litton Industries
- Spouse: Flora L. Thornton
- Children: 2
- Parents: Ward Augustus Thornton; Sarah Alice Bates

Charles Bates "Tex" Thornton (July 22, 1913 – November 24, 1981) was an American business executive who was the founder of Litton Industries.

== Early life ==
Charles Bates Thornton was born on July 22, 1913, in Goree, Texas.

== Career ==
He served in the United States Army Air Forces during World War II, reaching the rank of Colonel and commanding a staff of officers in the office of statistical control. Following the war he offered the group of ten to several employers as an all-or-nothing proposition to provide the corporation with an analytical management team. Henry Ford II had recently taken over Ford Motor Company, which was in bad financial shape and had virtually non-existent financial control systems. He interviewed and hired the team, which became known as the "Whiz Kids". Seven of the ten went on to senior executive positions.

Thornton left Ford in 1948 to work for Hughes Aircraft. In 1953, he founded a company called Electro-Dynamics, then acquired the vacuum tube manufacturing business of Charles Litton, Sr. in 1953. In 1954, Electro-Dynamics also bought the rights to use the well-known "Litton" name. Through a series of mergers and acquisitions orchestrated by Thornton, Litton became a huge conglomerate with a wide range of products.

In 1966, Thornton received the Golden Plate Award of the American Academy of Achievement.

He was awarded the Presidential Medal of Freedom by President Ronald Reagan in October, 1981.

== Philanthropy ==
The USC Thornton School of Music at the University of Southern California is named in honor of Thornton's widow, Flora L. Thornton, due in part to a $25 million donation she made in 1999. Thornton was a trustee and donor to the university for many years. The Thornton Center for Engineering Management at Stanford University is also named in honor of Thornton. The Charles B. Thornton Administrative Center on the Pepperdine University campus in Malibu, California, is a tribute to the Thornton family.

== Death ==
He died in November 1981. He was buried at the Arlington National Cemetery.

== Bibliography ==
- Bird, David (November 26, 1981). "Charles B. Thornton Dead at 68; Was a Litton Industries Founder". The New York Times. New York. p. D14.
- Byrne, John A. (1993). The Whiz Kids: The Founding Fathers of American Business and the Legacy They Left Us. New York: Doubleday.
- Lay, Jr., Beirne (1969). Someone Has To Make It Happen: The Inside Story of Tex Thornton, the Man who Built Litton Industries. Englewood Cliffs, N.J.: Prentice-Hall. LCCN 74-75683. OCLC 16719.
- Sobel, Robert (1984). The Rise and Fall of the Conglomerate Kings. New York: Stein and Day. ISBN 0-8128-2961-1.
- Rodengen, Jeffrey L. (2000). The Legend of Litton Industries. Fort Lauderdale, Fla.: Write Stuff Enterprises. ISBN 0-945903-51-0.
