= Ron Thornton (Australian footballer) =

Australian rules footballer (born 1961)

Personal information
- Full name: Ronald Thornton
- Born: 19 June 1961 (age 65)
- Original team: Brunswick
- Height: 183 cm (6 ft 0 in)
- Weight: 80 kg (176 lb)

Playing career^{1}
| Years | Club | Games (Goals) |
| 1986 | Richmond | 8 (6) |
- ^{1} Playing statistics correct to the end of 1986.

Ron Thornton (born 19 June 1961) is a former Australian rules footballer who played with Richmond in the Victorian Football League (VFL).
