= Frank Thornton (cricketer) =

English cricketer (1898–1987)

Personal information
- Full name: Frank Kenneis Thornton
- Born: 25 October 1898; Leicester, Leicestershire, England
- Died: 8 September 1987 (aged 88); Fareham, Hampshire, England
- Batting: Right-handed
- Relatives: John Thornton (brother)

Domestic team information
- Years: Team
- 1937: Northamptonshire

Career statistics
| Competition | First-class |
|---|---|
| Matches | 2 |
| Runs scored | 27 |
| Batting average | 9.00 |
| 100s/50s | –/– |
| Top score | 13 |
| Balls bowled | – |
| Wickets | – |
| Bowling average | – |
| 5 wickets in innings | – |
| 10 wickets in match | – |
| Best bowling | – |
| Catches/stumpings | –/– |
- Source: Cricinfo, 18 November 2011

Frank Kenneis Thornton (28 October 1898 – 8 September 1987) was an English cricketer. Thornton was a right-handed batsman. He was born at Leicester, Leicestershire.

Thornton made two first-class appearances for Northamptonshire in the 1937 County Championship against Essex and Lancashire. In the match against Essex at the Town Ground, Peterborough, Thornton scored 13 runs in Northamptonshire's first-innings, before being dismissed by Stan Nichols, while in their second-innings he was dismissed by the same bowler for 9 runs. In the match against Lancashire at the County Ground, Northampton, he scored a single run in Northamptonshire first-innings, before being dismissed by Dick Pollard, while in their second-innings he ended not out on 4.

He died at Fareham, Hampshire on 8 September 1987. His brother John was also a first-class cricketer.
