= John Thornton (defensive tackle, born 1969) =

American football player (born 1969)

No. 91, 94
- Position: Defensive tackle

Personal information
- Born: June 28, 1969; Flint, Michigan, U.S.
- Died: April 29, 2025 (aged 55); Montrose, Michigan, U.S.
- Listed height: 6 ft 3 in (1.91 m)
- Listed weight: 303 lb (137 kg)

Career information
- High school: Beecher (Flint)
- College: Cincinnati
- NFL draft: 1991: undrafted

Career history
- New Orleans Saints (1991)*; Cleveland Browns (1991–1992); San Diego Chargers (1993)*; Minnesota Vikings (1993); Atlanta Falcons (1994)*; Toronto Argonauts (1995)*
- * Offseason or practice squad member only
- Stats at Pro Football Reference

John Earvin Thornton Jr. (June 28, 1969 – April 29, 2025) was an American professional football defensive tackle who played for the Cleveland Browns of the National Football League (NFL). He played college football at the University of Cincinnati.

== Early life and college ==
John Earvin Thornton Jr. was born on June 28, 1969, in Flint, Michigan. He attended Beecher High School in Flint.

Thornton played college football at the University of Cincinnati, where he was a three-year letterman for the Cincinnati Bearcats from 1988 to 1990.

== Professional career ==
Thornton signed with the New Orleans Saints on May 6, 1991, after going undrafted in the 1991 NFL draft. He was released on August 19, 1991.

Thornton was signed by the Cleveland Browns on August 21, 1991. He was released on August 26 and signed to the team's practice squad on August 28. He was promoted to the active roster on November 22, 1991, and played in five games during the 1991 season, posting one sack. Thornton was placed on injured reserve on August 30, 1992, after breaking his leg. The injury caused a blood clot that almost killed him. He was in the intensive care unit for a week. Thornton missed the entire 1992 season. He was waived by Cleveland on August 9, 1993.

Thornton was claimed off waivers by the San Diego Chargers on August 10, 1993. He was soon released on August 24, 1993.

On December 22, 1993, Thornton was signed to the active roster of the Minnesota Vikings. However, he did not play in any games during the 1993 season. He was released on January 4, 1994, before the team's Wildcard round playoff game.

Thornton signed with the Atlanta Falcons on July 26, 1994, but was later released on August 21, 1994.

Thornton was signed by the Toronto Argonauts of the Canadian Football League on May 5, 1995. He was released on June 19, 1995. After hearing that he had been released, he punched out a window on head coach Mike Faragalli's car. He also threatened to cut several people with scissors.

== Personal life ==
Thornton later worked in retail. He died on April 29, 2025, in Montrose, Michigan.
