= John Thornton (glass painter) =

English stained glass artist (fl.1405–1433)

Thornton's depiction of St John the Baptist, from the Great East Window of York Minster, showing his characteristic treatment of faces

John Thornton of Coventry (fl. 1405–1433) was a master glazier and stained glass artist active in England during the 15th century. The output of his workshop includes some of the finest English medieval glass.

== Biography ==
The first certain record of Thornton, apart from a possible 1371 reference in Coventry, is his 1405 contract with the Dean of York Minster to glaze the quire east window. The Archbishop of York at the time was Richard le Scrope, a former Bishop of Lichfield and Coventry, and the window was funded by Walter Skirlaw, also previously Bishop of Coventry, so it seems possible both men would have recommended Thornton based on their knowledge of his work in his home town.

Thornton was made a freeman of York in 1410, but was known to be back living in the St John's Bridges area of Coventry (now known as Burges) by 1413. He appears again in 1433, when he received further payment from the dean and chapter of York, and was recorded as holding property there.

It has been suggested, though without any strong evidence, that Thornton was the son of a "John Coventre", a glazier in the royal glass-painting workshops at Westminster in 1351 and 1352, who later assisted in setting up windows at Windsor Castle for Edward III of England. Thornton could have worked as an assistant to his father before rising to the position of designer and draughtsman.

== Works ==
Thornton was instrumental in disseminating the International Gothic style in the north and Midlands of England. The products of his workshop can be recognised by their favouring of white glass and yellow stain set against blue and ruby "seaweed"-patterned backgrounds, and by the very distinctive modelling of faces.

Thornton's masterpiece is the Great East Window of York Minster, the largest in the building and containing about 1,680 square feet (156 m^{2}) of glass. Thornton received the commission in 1405, and finished the window just three years later. According to the contract, much of the work was to be executed by his own hand, though specifically only to "pourtray [...] the histories, images, and other things to be painted on the [window]"; evidently some of the glazing would be carried out by apprentices or workmen. Thornton is likely to have recruited glaziers locally in York: he seems to have been an enthusiastic teacher, and his style quickly became dominant in the area.

Work thought to be by Thornton can also be found in several smaller churches, as well as in St Mary's Hall in Coventry. His surviving windows for Coventry Cathedral were removed before it was destroyed in the Coventry Blitz and have been preserved. He is also thought to have produced the windows from the chapel at Hampton Court, Herefordshire, which are now dispersed in various collections, and seven panels in the Church of St. Mary Magdalene, Newark-on-Trent.

The Thornton 'tradition' continued in York even after the middle of the 15th century, though many of the works produced show a coarsening or loss of quality compared with Thornton's authentic creations.

=== Examples of his work from the East Window in York Minster ===
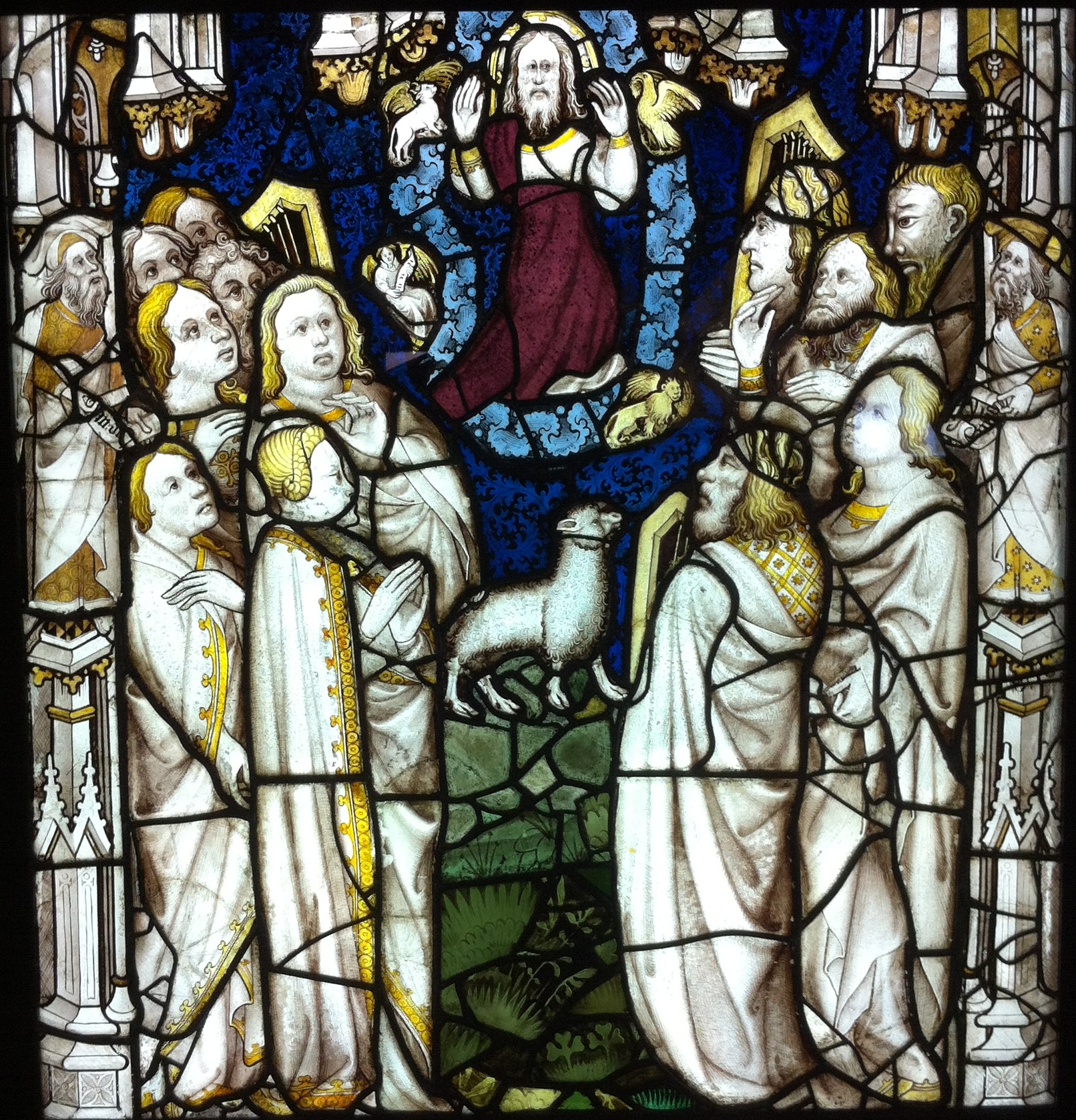
The Lamb on Mount Zion and the Redeemed

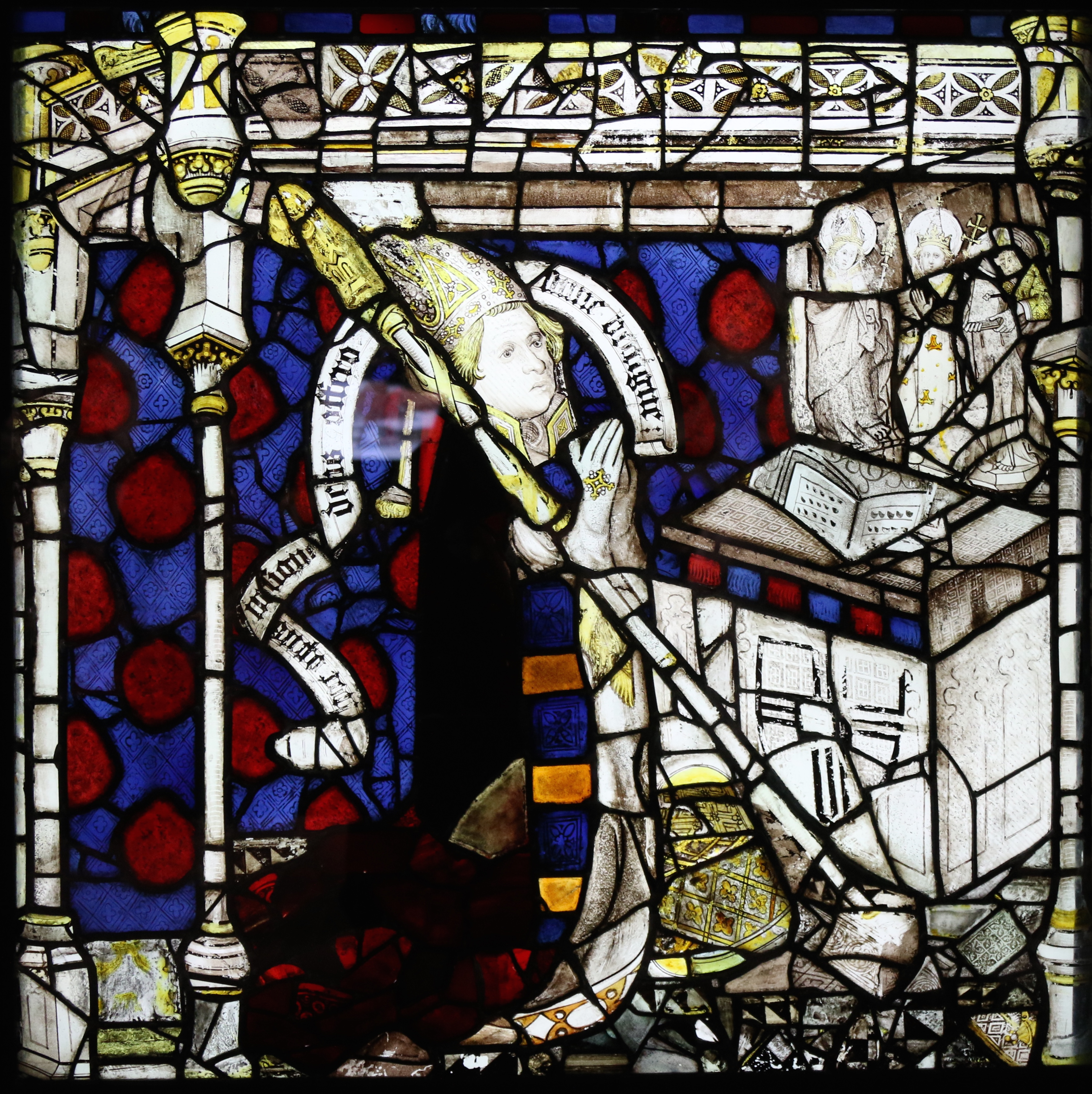
Bishop Walter Skirlaw

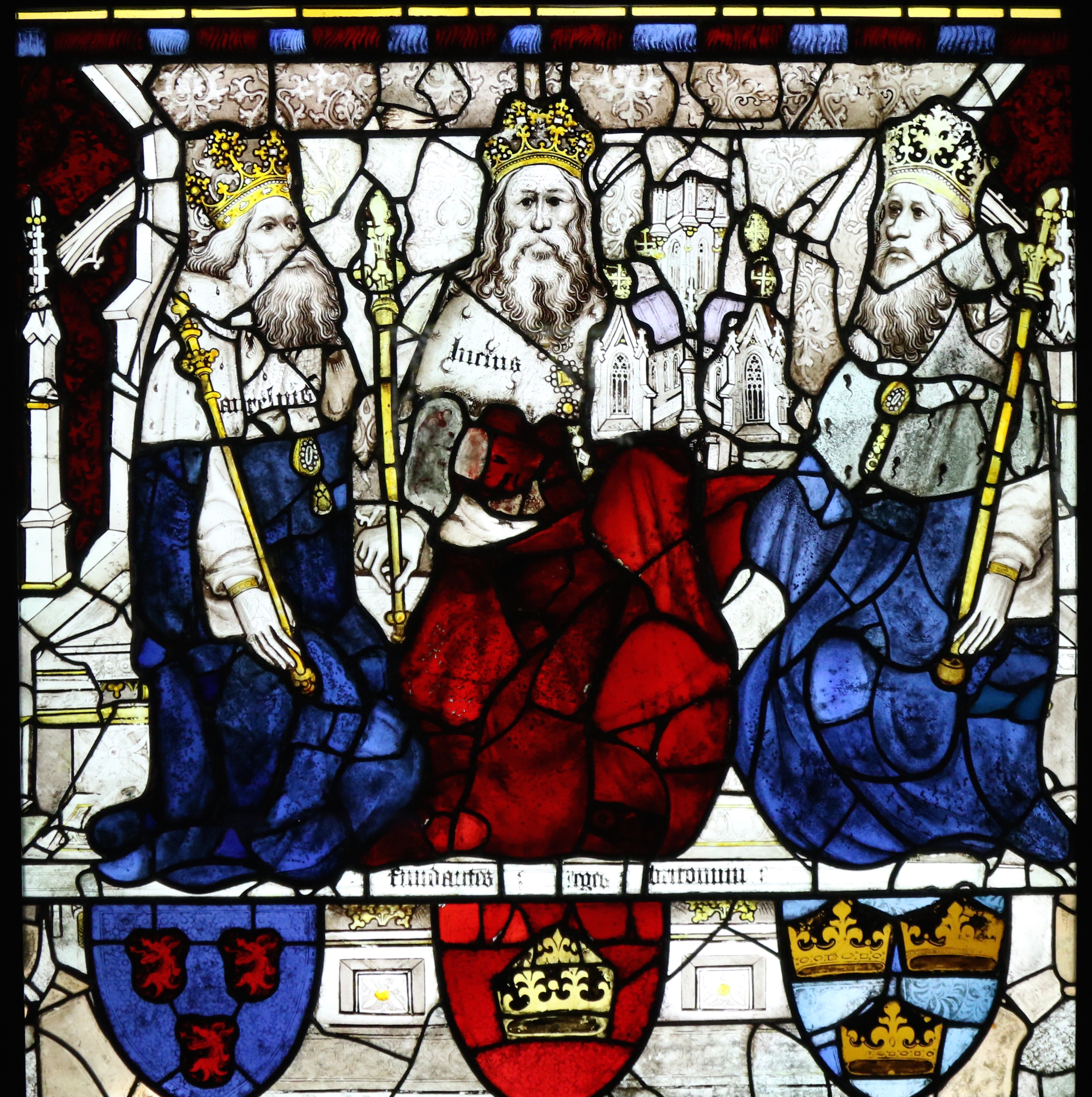
King Lucius and two other Kings

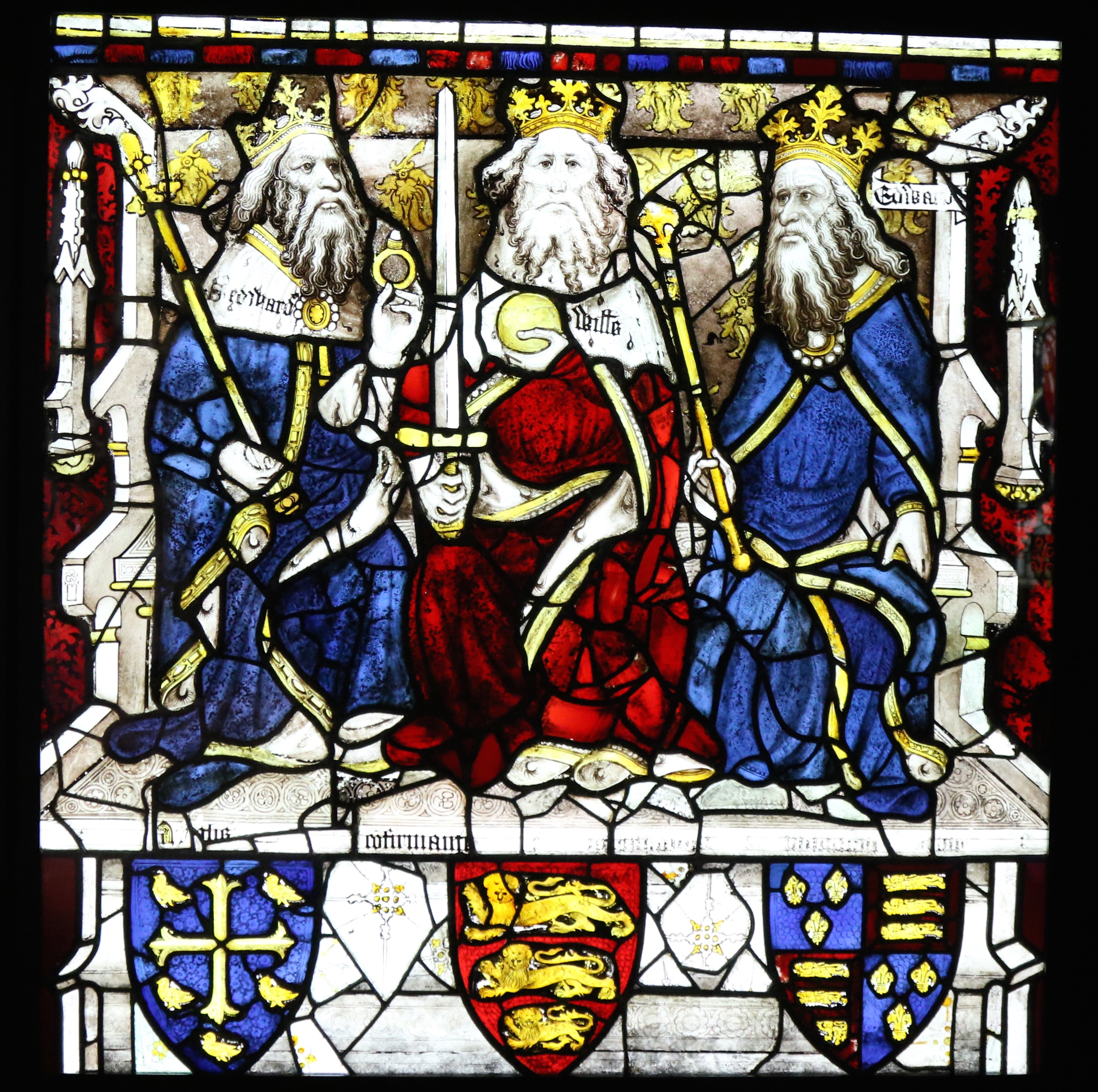
King William I, King Edward the Confessor, King Edward III

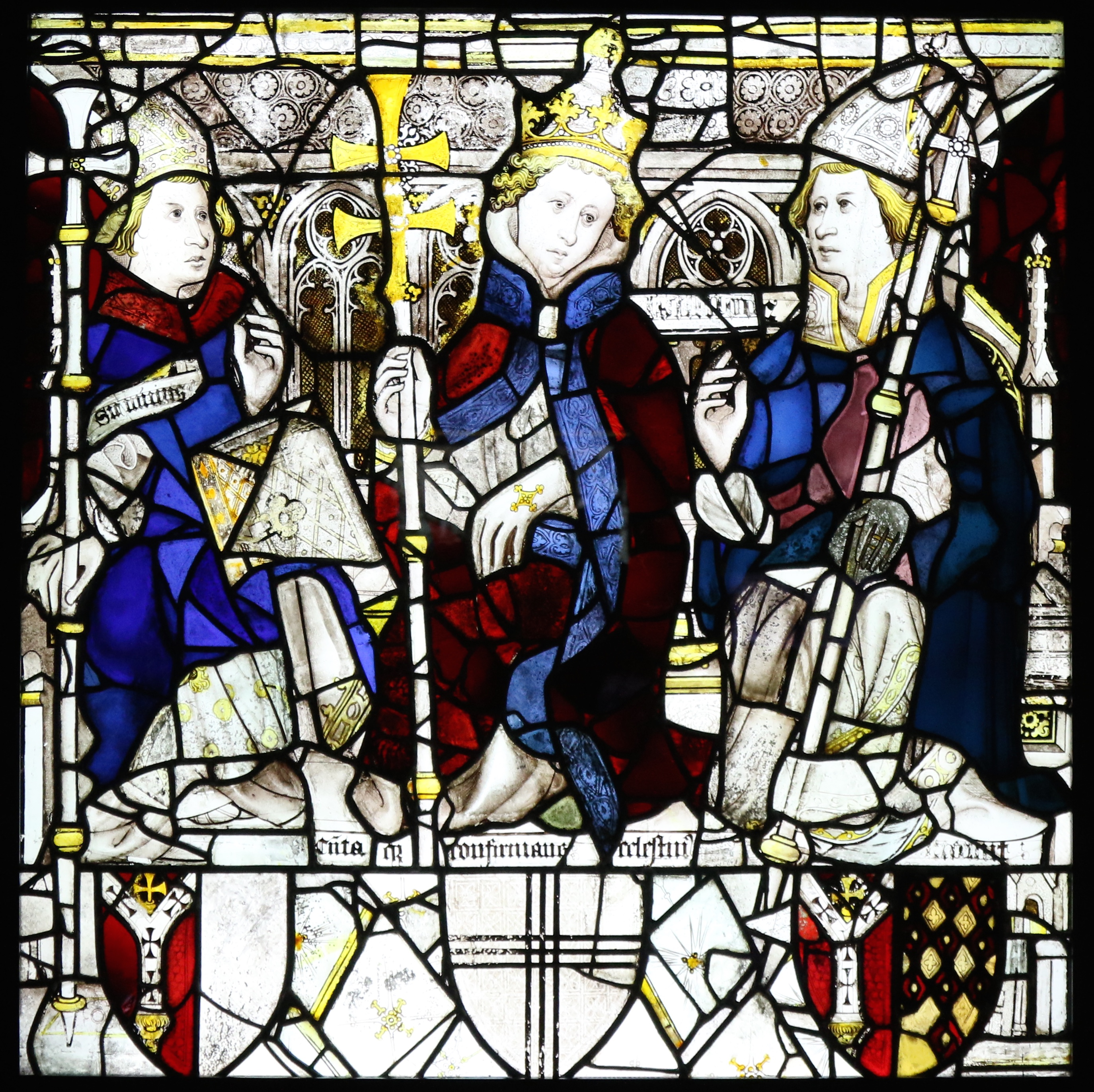
Pope Celestine III, St William and an unidentified Prelate

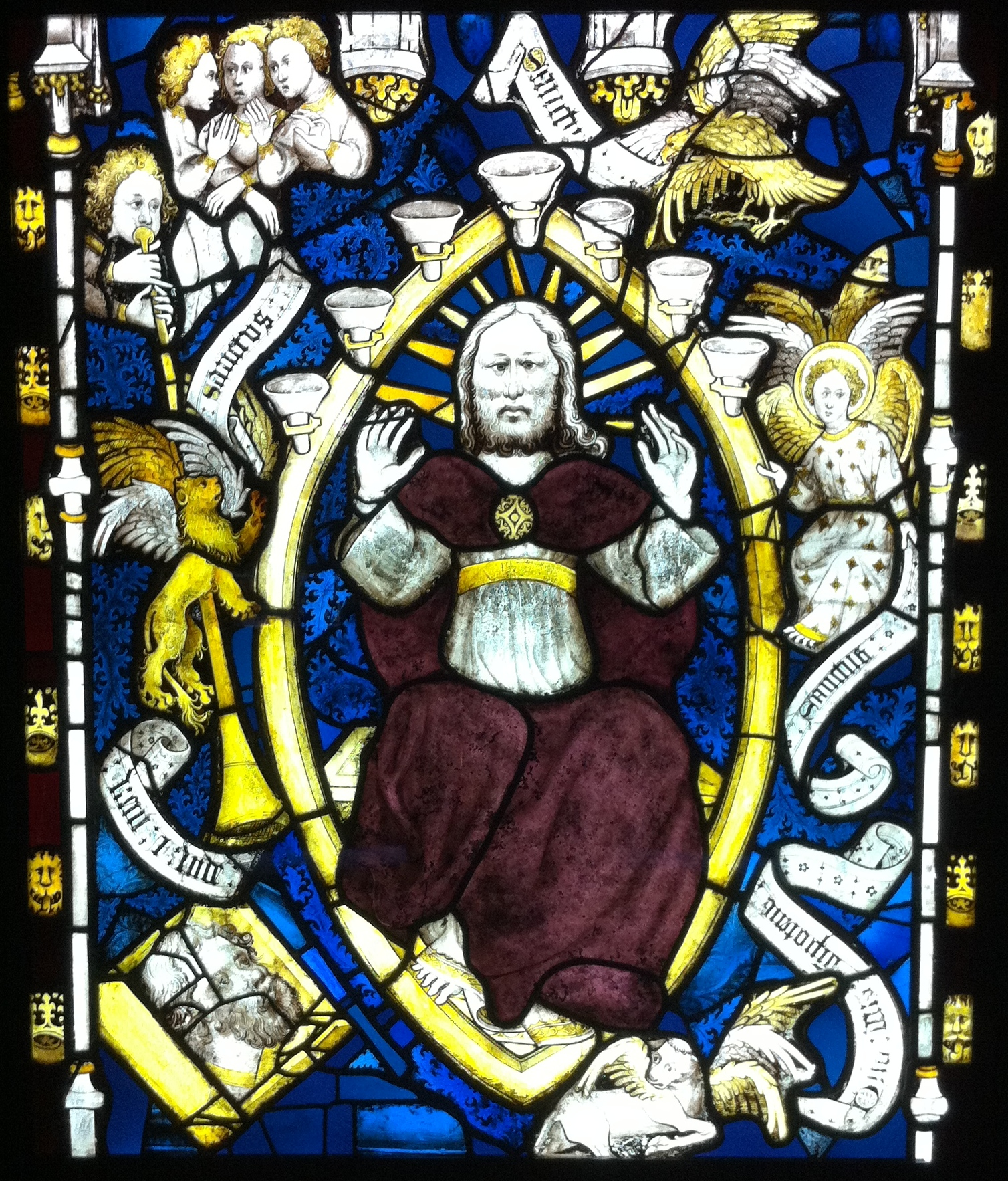
St John glimpses God in Majesty

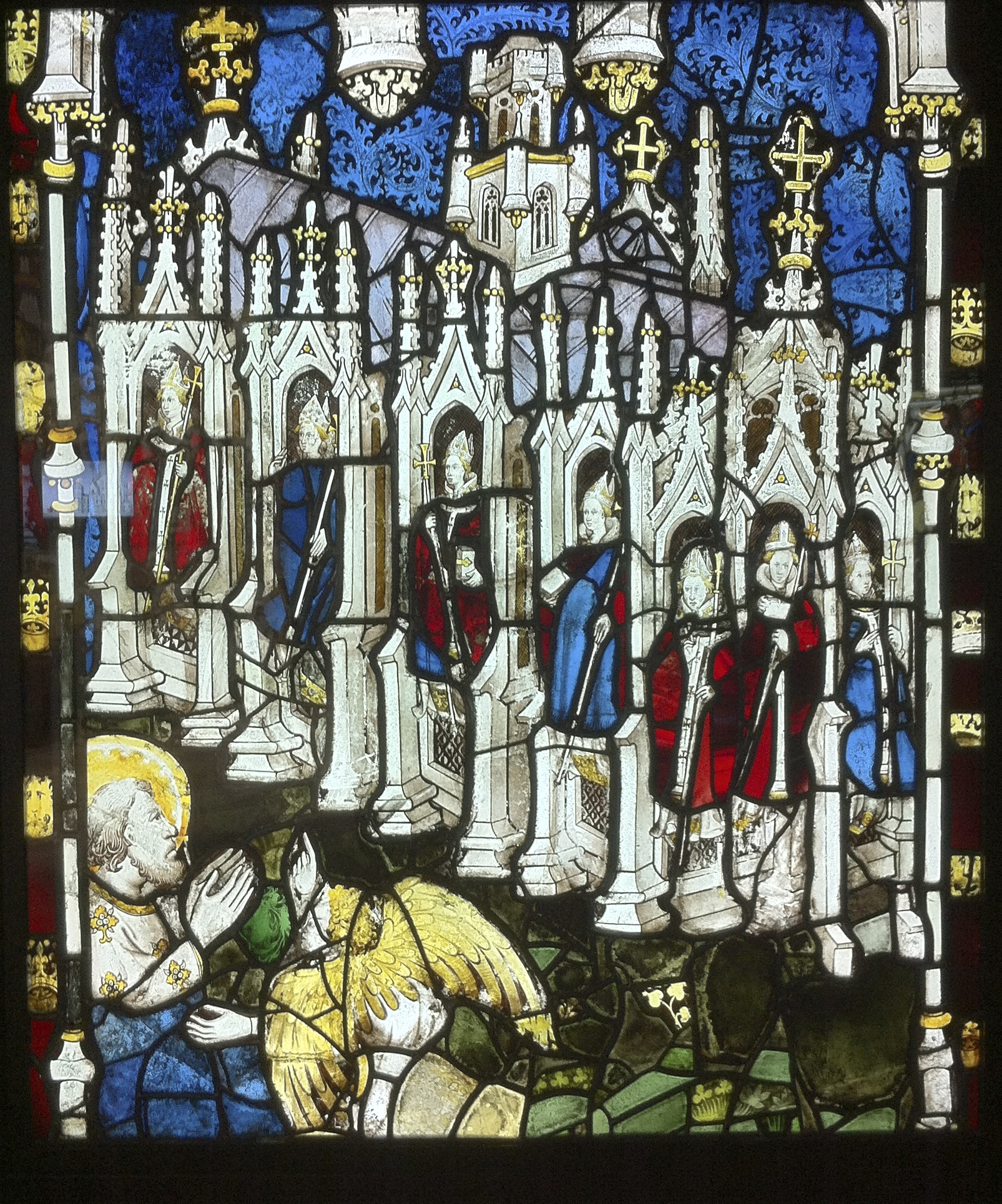
Seven churches of Asia

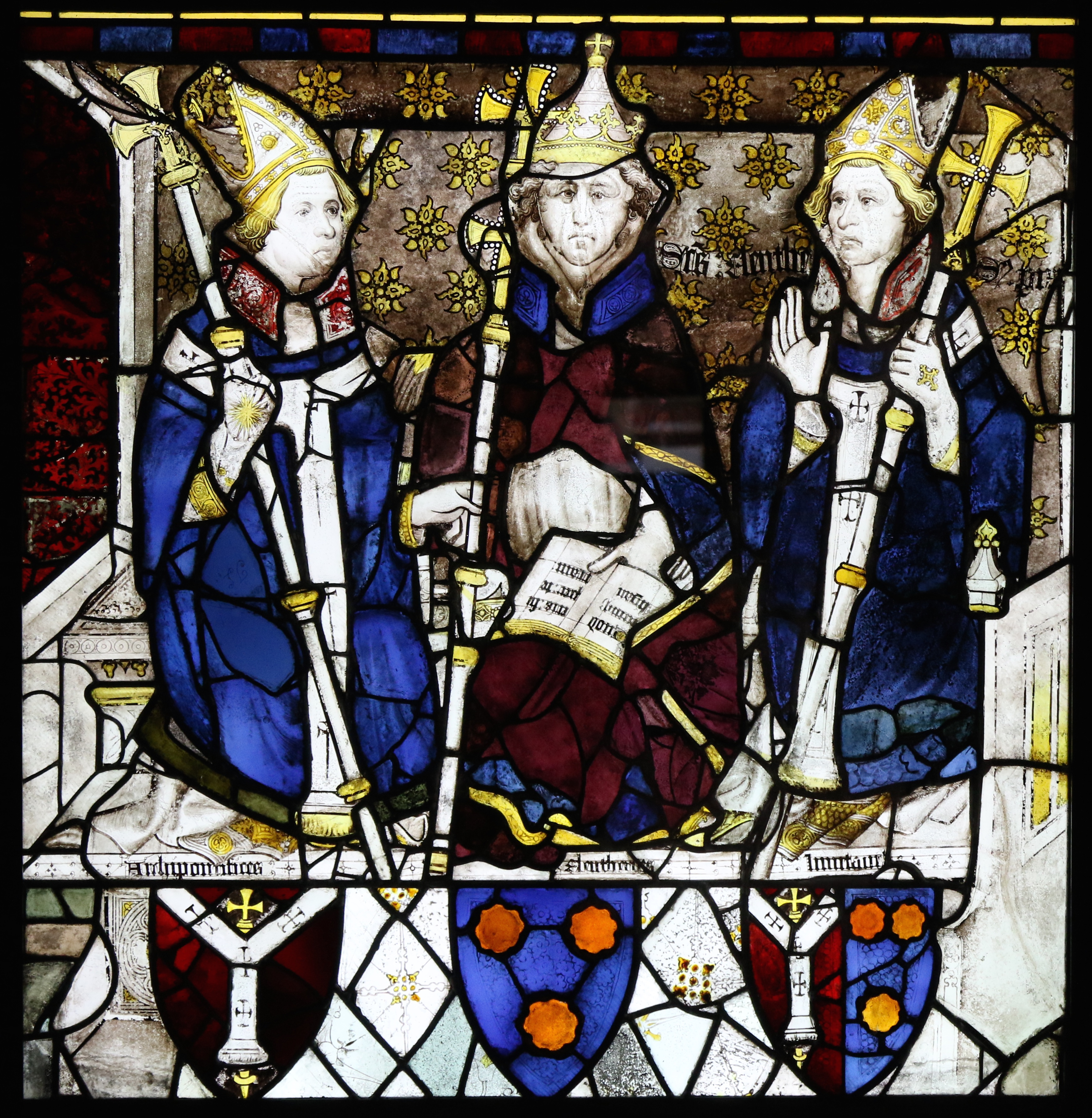
St Eleutherius, St Pirrannus and an unidentified Archbishop-Saint

== See also ==
- Thomas Glazier of Oxford, a contemporary of Thornton and also a practitioner of the International Gothic style in stained glass.
