= Tim Thornton (musician, born 1988) =

British jazz double bassist (born 1988)

Tim Thornton (born 1988) is a double bassist based in London, UK, and a regular performer on the British jazz scene. He is the leader of the Tim Thornton Quartet.

== Early life and education ==
Thornton is the son of Neal Thornton (pianist/composer) and Sally Burgess (Mezzo Soprano/Director). He is a graduate of Birmingham Conservatoire.

== Career ==
During his years as a bassist, Thornton has performed live with many musicians, including Stan Sulzmann, Eric Alexander, Jim Mullen, Guy Barker, Sir Willard White, Gary Husband, Nigel Hitchcock, Alex Garnett, Anita Wardell, Stan Tracey, Liam Noble, Steve Brown, and Tom Cawley.

He is a regular member of the Ronnie Scott's Allstars led by James Pearson and also performs and has recorded with many different groups including the Steve Fishwick Quintet, Emma Smith Quintet, Brandon Allen Quartet, Tim Lapthorne Trio, Dave O’Higgins Quartet, Ivo Neame Quintet, Joe Pisto Quartet (Italy), and Sector 7.

Thornton is part of the Julian Bliss Septet, and in 2014 joined them on their Miles Davis Tribute Tour.

Thornton fronts his own band, the Tim Thornton Quartet. The group's debut album 'New Kid' (SEHSO05) features Thornton's childhood friend Chris Draper, Dave O’Higgins, Steve Fishwick, Ross Stanley, Grant Windsor, and Dave Hamblett performing a mixture of original music and arrangements.

Between tours in the UK and frequent international performances, In 2014 Thornton plays in London at venues such as Ronnie Scott's, Pizza Express Jazz Club, or the 606 Club.
