= Tim Thornton (philosopher) =

British philosopher (born 1965)

- Born: 7 December 1965 (age 60); Manchester, England, UK

Education
- Education: University of Cambridge (PhD)

Philosophical work
- Era: 21st-century philosophy
- Region: Western philosophy
- School: Analytic
- Institutions: University of Central Lancashire
- Main interests: philosophy of psychiatry
- Website: https://sites.google.com/site/drtimthornton/Home

Andrew Timothy Giles Thornton (born 1965) is a British philosopher and Professor of Philosophy and Mental Health at the University of Central Lancashire. He is a Senior Editor of the journal Philosophy, Psychiatry, & Psychology. Thornton is known for his works on philosophy of thought and language.

== Books ==
- Wittgenstein on Language and Thought (EUP 1998)
- John McDowell (Acumen 2004)
- Oxford Textbook of Philosophy and Psychiatry, co-authored with K.W.M. (Bill) Fulford and George Graham (OUP 2006)
- Essential Philosophy of Psychiatry (OUP 2007)
- Tacit Knowledge co-authored with Neil Gascoigne (Acumen 2013)
- Oxford Handbook of Philosophy and Psychiatry, edited with Fulford, K.W.M., Davies, M., Gipps, R., Graham, G., Sadler, J., and Stanghellini, (OUP 2014)
