= Jack Thornton (basketball) =

American basketball player (1914–2007)

Personal information
- Born: August 31, 1914 Leon Junction, Texas, US
- Died: December 13, 2007 (aged 93) Fort Worth, Texas, US
- Listed height: 6 ft 5 in (1.96 m)
- Listed weight: 200 lb (91 kg)

Career information
- High school: Gatesville (Gatesville, Texas)
- College: Texas Wesleyan (1938–1941)
- Position: Forward / center

Career history
- 1938: Hammond Ciesar All-Americans
- 1941: Sheboygan Red Skins

Jack Thornton (August 31, 1914 – December 13, 2007) was an American professional basketball player. He played in the National Basketball League for the Hammond Ciesar All-Americans in one game and for the Sheboygan Red Skins in two games. Thornton scored five total points.
