= Charles E. Thornton =

American journalist (1935–1985)

Charles E. Thornton (January 1, 1935 – September 19, 1985) was a medical reporter for the Arizona Republic newspaper. He was the first American journalist killed in Afghanistan after the Soviet invasion of 1979.

Thornton, age 50, and photographer Peter Schlueter were traveling in a truck with mujahideen fighters in September 1985 covering the work of an American medical team in the country. They were ambushed by Soviet troops and helicopters. Schlueter survived.

Thornton was inducted into the Arizona Newspapers Association Hall of Fame in 1996, the same year as murdered Arizona Republic investigative reporter Don Bolles.
