= James Thornton (health economist) =

American economist and academic (born 1955)

James Arthur Thornton (born 1955) is professor of economics at Eastern Michigan University in Ypsilanti, Michigan, where he teaches undergraduate and graduate classes. His research focuses on microeconomics, econometrics, and health economics. He received his B.A. from in 1978, his M.A from in 1980, both from Marquette University, Milwaukee, Wisconsin, and his Ph.D. in 1991 from University of Oregon, Eugene Oregon.. He immediately joined the EMU faculty, as assistant professor, becoming associate professor in 1995 and full professor in 2000, since 1999 he has been director of the graduate program in economics at EMU. He is a reviewer for the National Science Foundation and a member of the International Health Economics Association, American Society of Health Economists, the American Economic Association, the Southern Economic Association and the Midwest Economic Association.

== Publications ==
He has published 20 article in peer-reviewed journals. His most cited paper, "How important are economic factors in choice of medical specialty?" by Thornton J, Esposto F in Health Economics 12(1):67-73 has been cited 17 times. doi:10.1002/hec.682
