= John Thornton (Australian cricketer) =

Australian cricketer (1835–1919)

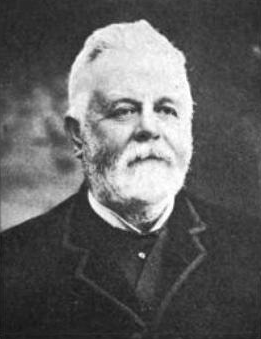

Personal information
- Born: 16 January 1835; Huddersfield, England
- Died: 15 December 1919 (aged 84); Camperdown, Victoria, Australia

Domestic team information
- Years: Team
- 1858-1860: Victoria
- Source: Cricinfo, 2 May 2015

John Thornton (16 January 1835 – 15 December 1919) was an Australian cricketer. He played two first-class cricket matches for Victoria between 1858 and 1860.

== Biography ==
John Thornton was born in Huddersfield, England on 16 January 1835. He came to Victoria aboard SS Great Britain in 1853, and settled in Camperdown. He married Agnes Clough in 1862, and they had three children.

He owned a dairy farm at Cobden, and founded the auctioneering firm John Thornton and Co.

He died in Camperdown on 15 December 1919.

== See also ==
- List of Victoria first-class cricketers
