= Charles Wade Thornton =

British military officer (1764–1854)

Lieutenant-General Sir Charles Wade Thornton KCH
- Born: 1 June 1764; Northumberland County, Virginia
- Died: 6 April 1854 (aged 89); St James's Palace, London, UK
- Burial place: St. Mary's Churchyard, Paddington, England
- Military career
- Allegiance: United Kingdom
- Branch: British Army
- Rank: Lieutenant-General

Lieutenant-General Sir Charles Wade Thornton, KCH (1 June 1764 – 6 April 1854) was a British military officer who served during the Napoleonic Wars.

== Life ==
Thornton was born in Northumberland County, Virginia, to Presley Thornton and Charlotte Belson. His father was a wealthy and politically powerful planter who was descended from William Thornton, who arrived from England before 1649. His father died when he was of an early age and his mother moved the family to England before the start of the Revolutionary War. Thornton entered the King's Army at the rank of lieutenant in 1779. He served in the Low Countries in 1792, and was wounded at the Battle of Famars and lost an arm during the Battle of Lannoy during the Flanders campaign the following year.

He rose to the rank of captain in 1793, lieutenant-colonel in 1811, colonel in 1825, major-general in 1837 and finally lieutenant-general in 1846. In 1831 Thornton was knighted by William IV and made a Knight Commander of the Royal Guelphic Order. He was appointed Lieutenant-Governor of Hull in 1816.

Thornton had a close relationship with the British Royal family over his life, serving under the Duke of York and saving the Duke's life during the Flanders campaign in 1793. He was equerry to the Duke of Cumberland from 1813 until his death and had a close relationship with George IV. Thornton was among the chief mourners at the funeral of H.R.H. Princess Sophia.

Thornton died on 6 April 1854 in his private apartment at St James's Palace. He was buried in St. Mary's Churchyard, Paddington, next to the grave of his mother.
