= Harry I. Thornton =

American politician from California (c.1834–1895)

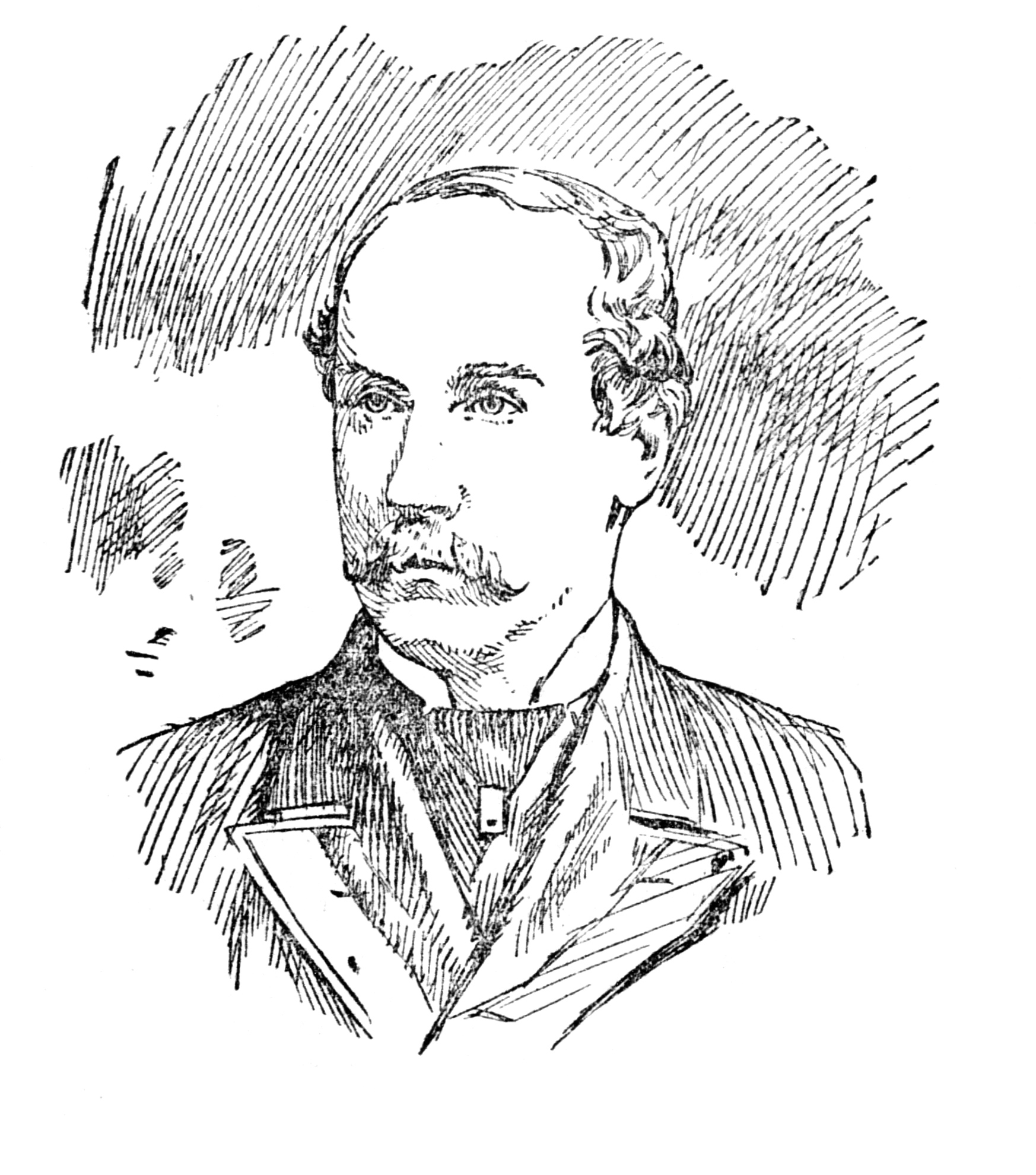

California State Senate
- In office 1850s

Personal details
- Born: Harry Innes Thornton Jr. 1834 Greene County, Alabama
- Died: February 25, 1895 (aged 60–61) Fresno, California
- Party: Democratic

Harry Innes Thornton Jr. (c. 1834 – February 25, 1895) was an American Democratic politician and attorney in California.

== Biography ==
Born in Greene County, Alabama, Thornton followed his family to California. In 1841, his father Harry Innis Thornton Sr. was a judge and member of the Alabama Legislature, residing in Eutaw, Alabama. By 1851, Thornton Sr. moved to California and was appointed to the federal Public Land Commission to address property ownership in California. By 1854, Thornton Jr.'s sister and her husband, James D. Thornton, had moved to San Francisco, also.

== Career ==
Thornton Jr. was a member of the California State Senate during the 1850s. At the start of the American Civil War, he gave a speech on the floor of the Senate defending the Southern states' rights to succeed. He resigned from the Legislature and went to serve in the Army of the Confederate States of America. He was wounded at the Battle of Chickamauga from September 18 to 20, 1863 while serving with the 58th Regiment Alabama Infantry. After the war, he returned to California and practiced law in that state and Nevada, handling complex mining litigation. He died in Fresno, California, on February 25, 1895.
