= Compression Systems =

Compression Systems (formerly Cooper Compression / Cooper Energy Services / Cooper Turbocompressor / Cooper), one of five organizational groups within Cameron International Corporation, is a provider of reciprocating and centrifugal compression equipment and aftermarket parts and services. Reciprocating compression equipment is used throughout the energy industry by gas transmission companies, compression leasing companies, oil and gas producers and independent power producers. Integrally geared centrifugal compressors are used by customers around the world in a variety of industries such as air separation, auto making, glass blowing, PET, petrochemical and chemical. Reciprocating compression was sold to GE Oil and Gas in June 2014.

== History ==
Compression Systems began in 1833 when Charles and Elias Cooper established a foundry in Mt. Vernon, Ohio. "Cooper", as it was known, was licensed to produce the Corliss steam engine in 1869 and entered the production of natural gas internal combustion engines in 1900. In 1929, Cooper merged with Bessemer Gas Engine Company, which was founded in Grove City, Pennsylvania, in 1899. In 1958, Cooper diversified into the controls industry with the establishment of the En-Tronic Controls Group. Five years later, the company acquired the Ajax Engine Company, founded in 1877, and the Pennsylvania Process, founded to manufacture compressors in 1920.

In 1965, the company branched out into electrical, automotive and tools and hardware industries. Two years later, it moved its headquarters to Houston and in 1968 began the Cooper Rolls joint venture with Rolls-Royce to market gas turbines.

1987 marked the acquisition of Joy Industrial Compressor Group, founded in 1955 in Buffalo, New York, which was renamed Cooper Turbocompressor as part of Cooper Compression. One year later, Cooper acquired Enterprise Engine after market services business.

In 1999, the rotating compressor business was sold to Rolls-Royce and Cooper Energy Services merged with Nickles Industrial Manufacturing and purchased Elliot Turbocharger Group, Inc.

In 2001, Cooper Energy Services and Cooper Turbocompresor combined to form Cooper Compression, which was later named Compression Systems in 2005.

== Compression System brands ==
=== Reciprocating compressors ===
Ajax Engines

Cooper Bessemer integral engines

Superior Engines & Compressors

Turbine Specialties Engine Turbochargers (TSI)

Compression Specialties (CSI)

Texcentric Compressor Valves

Enterprise Engine enterprise power engines and separable compressors

Pennsylvania Process Separable Compressors

=== Centrifugal plant air compressors ===
Turbo Air

Joy Compressor

=== Centrifugal engineered air and process gas compressors ===
MSG

Turbo Air
