= Cameron Measurement Systems =

Oil and gas instrumentation designer, manufacturer, and distributor

- Formerly: NuFlo Measurement Systems
- Company type: Subsidiary
- Industry: Petroleum industry
- Predecessors: Barton Instrument Systems, Halliburton Measurement Systems, and PMC Global Industries
- Founded: 2003
- Defunct: 2005
- Fate: Acquired and merged
- Successor: Cameron’s Measurement Systems Division
- Headquarters: United States
- Area served: Worldwide
- Products: Measurement equipment for oil drilling and extraction
- Owner: Schlumberger
- Parent: Cameron International
- Website: www.slb.com/products-and-services/innovating-in-oil-and-gas/well-production/midstream/measurement

Cameron Measurement Systems (formerly NuFlo Measurement Systems) was an American subsidiary that designed, manufactured and distributed measurement, quality, and control instrumentation for the global oil and gas and process control industries.

NuFlo became a division of Cameron International in 2005 and has since become part of Schlumberger with the Cameron brand and sub brands retained for some of its products.

== History ==
The company was first established in 2003 as NuFlo Measurement Systems, which was itself the result of merger of three measurement companies: Barton Instrument Systems, Halliburton Measurement Systems and PMC Global Industries.

Two strategic acquisitions made by the newly formed division included Caldon Inc. and Jiskoot Ltd. Caldon is a supplier of ultrasonic metering solutions and Jiskoot manufactures sampling and blending systems for oil and gas applications. These two business units are at the core of the division's push to establish itself in fiscal and custody transfer applications such as LNG storage, ship loading & unloading and FPSOs.

Other acquisitions include PRIME Measurement Products, North Star Flow Products and the technologies of Polartek 2000 Ltd. and Sentech AS.

Cameron's Measurement Systems division products included DPU products, turbine meters and totalizers; and sampling and blending. The division is also provided ultrasonic flow metering and electronic flow measurement.

The company was acquired by Cameron in 2005, which was itself acquired by Schlumberger in 2016.

== Measurement Systems division Brands ==
- Barton
- NuFlo
- Clif Mock
- Caldon
- Jiskoot

=== Sub-Brands ===
- True Cut
- Scanner
- MVX
- CoJetix
