= Smith International =

Defunct oil and gas equipment company

Smith International, Inc.
- Type: Subsidiary of Schlumberger
- Industry: Oil & Gas Equipment & Services
- Founded: 1937
- Headquarters: Harris County, Texas, United States
- Key people: Jean Francois (J-F) Poupeau, President, Drilling Group, Schlumberger
- Revenue: ▲$10.770 billion USD (2008)
- Operating income: ▲$1.64211 billion USD (2008)
- Net income: ▲$767 million USD (2008)
- Number of employees: 19,865 (2008))
- Website: www.smith.com

Smith International was a Fortune 500 company headquartered in the Greenspoint district and in unincorporated Harris County, Texas. Smith International ceased to exist as an independent company following the merger with Schlumberger. This company supplies products to gas and oil production and exploration companies. The company used to be identified by its red Sii logo. The company has recently changed its logo to consist of the word "SMITH" in black capital letters with a green globe.

A February 21, 2010 announcement said Schlumberger would acquire the company in an all-stock deal valued at $11.3 billion. The sale price of 45.84 per share was 37.5 percent higher than Smith's closing price on February 18, 2010. The deal was the biggest acquisition in Schlumberger history until their acquisition of Cameron International.

The merger received unconditional approval from the US Department of Justice on July 27, 2010. Subsequently, the merger with Schlumberger was completed on August 27, 2010.

== Company history ==
The original part of the company, Smith Bits, grew out of a blacksmith shop in the small town of Whittier, California, in 1902. It was there, at the age of 20, that Herman C. Smith became the right man in the right place at the right time: oil was discovered nearby and the local drilling operators needed their fishtail bits sharpened. Smith had the skills to do the job, but being a curious sort, began to tinker. Using his knowledge of metals, he modified and improved oilfield tools, designing and constructing new tools on demand. Over the ensuing 80-some years, Smith's humble shop grew into a major operation specializing in drill bits, heavyweight collars and drill pipe, with corporate headquarters in Houston.

In the mid-1980s, business faltered due to declining oil prices and the loss of a lawsuit against Hughes Tool (now part of Hughes Christensen). Under the leadership of then CEO Doug Rock, the company began to rebuild and reinvent itself in a campaign of growth through acquisition. Over the next 20 years, Smith acquired more than 80 companies, the largest of which was W-H Energy purchased in 2008, itself a conglomerate of more than a dozen businesses. During this time, Smith also relocated its offices from Irvine, California to Houston, Texas.

The strategy worked. Smith International grew into a global, diversified Fortune 500 company that had three main operating segments: M-I SWACO, a 60-40% joint venture with Schlumberger; Wilson Distribution, one of the two largest energy industry supply chain solutions businesses in North America; and, as of last year, Smith Oilfield. The latter encompasses Smith Bits, Smith Services and all of the acquired W-H Energy businesses, the majority of which have retained their original names and identities.

== Company Divisions ==
Smith International had many separate divisions that perform various functions in drilling and the petrochemical industry. Many of the legacy brand names have been retained post-merger with Schlumberger under Schlumberger's Drilling Products & Services. These are:

- Smith Bits - A Schlumberger Company (formerly Sii Bits).
- PathFinder - A Schlumberger Company (formerly Pathfinder Energy Services)
- Dyna-drill
- Neyrfor - A Schlumberger Company designs, manufactures, and markets turbodrills, used to drill oil and gas wells.
- Smith Services - A Schlumberger Company
- Wilson Leading distributor of pipe, valves, fittings, mill and safety supplies
- M-I SWACO - A Schlumberger Company
- At Balance - A Schlumberger Company
- MegaDiamond
- Thomas Tools
- E&P Wireline Services
- DRILCO Inspection Services

== See also ==
- List of oilfield service companies
