= USS Grackle (AM-73) =

WW2 US Navy Minesweeper

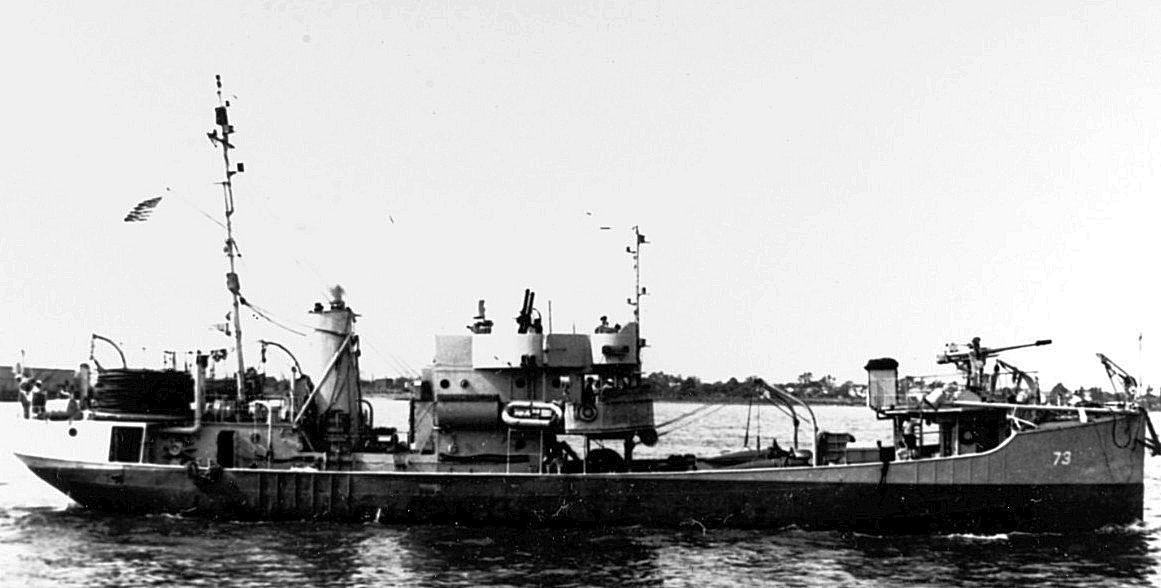

History

United States
- Name: USS Grackle
- Builder: Bath Iron Works, Bath, Maine
- Laid down: 6 June 1929
- Launched: 2 December 1929, as MV Notre Dame
- Acquired: 16 September 1940
- Commissioned: 4 February 1941
- Decommissioned: 25 August 1944
- Renamed: Grackle, 14 August 1940
- Stricken: 16 September 1944
- Fate: Transferred to the Maritime Commission for disposal, 9 September 1946

General characteristics
- Type: Minesweeper
- Displacement: 755 long tons (767 t)
- Length: 132 ft 4 in (40.34 m)
- Beam: 24 ft (7.3 m)
- Draft: 11 ft 6 in (3.51 m)
- Propulsion: 1 × 500 shp (373 kW) Cooper Bessemer diesel engine; 1 × shaft
- Speed: 10 knots (19 km/h; 12 mph)
- Complement: 36
- Armament: 1 × 3"/23 caliber gun

USS Grackle (AM-73) was a minesweeper in the service of the United States Navy during World War II.

Grackle was laid down on 6 June 1929 as MV Notre Dame by the Bath Iron Works Corp. of Bath, Maine, for F. J. O'Hara and Sons, Inc. of Boston, Massachusetts. She was launched on 2 December 1929, delivered on 21 December 1929, and renamed Grackle on 14 August 1940. Acquired by the Navy on 16 September 1940, her conversion to a minesweeper began on 1 October 1940 at the Bethlehem Steel Co. of East Boston, Massachusetts. Grackle was commissioned on 4 February 1941, and her conversion completed on 15 March 1941.

== World War II North Atlantic operations ==
Following shakedown out of Yorktown, Virginia, and Newport, Rhode Island, USS Grackle departed Portland, Maine on 25 September 1941 for service in Newfoundland as a unit of Minesweeper Division 25, Squadron 9 of the Atlantic Fleet. Reaching Argentia, Newfoundland on 2 October, Grackle conducted minesweeping patrols from that port until 15 January 1942, and following repairs at Boston, Massachusetts she returned to sweeping duties at Argentia until the spring of 1944.

== Post-War deactivation ==
Grackle put in at Boston on 17 May 1944 and was decommissioned there on 25 August 1944. She was transferred to the Maritime Commission for disposal on 9 September 1946 and struck from the Naval Vessel Register on 16 September 1944. Final fate unknown.
