= Consulate General of Russia, Houston =

Diplomatic mission

Consulate General of the Russian Federation in Houston Генеральное консульство Российской Федерации в Хьюстоне
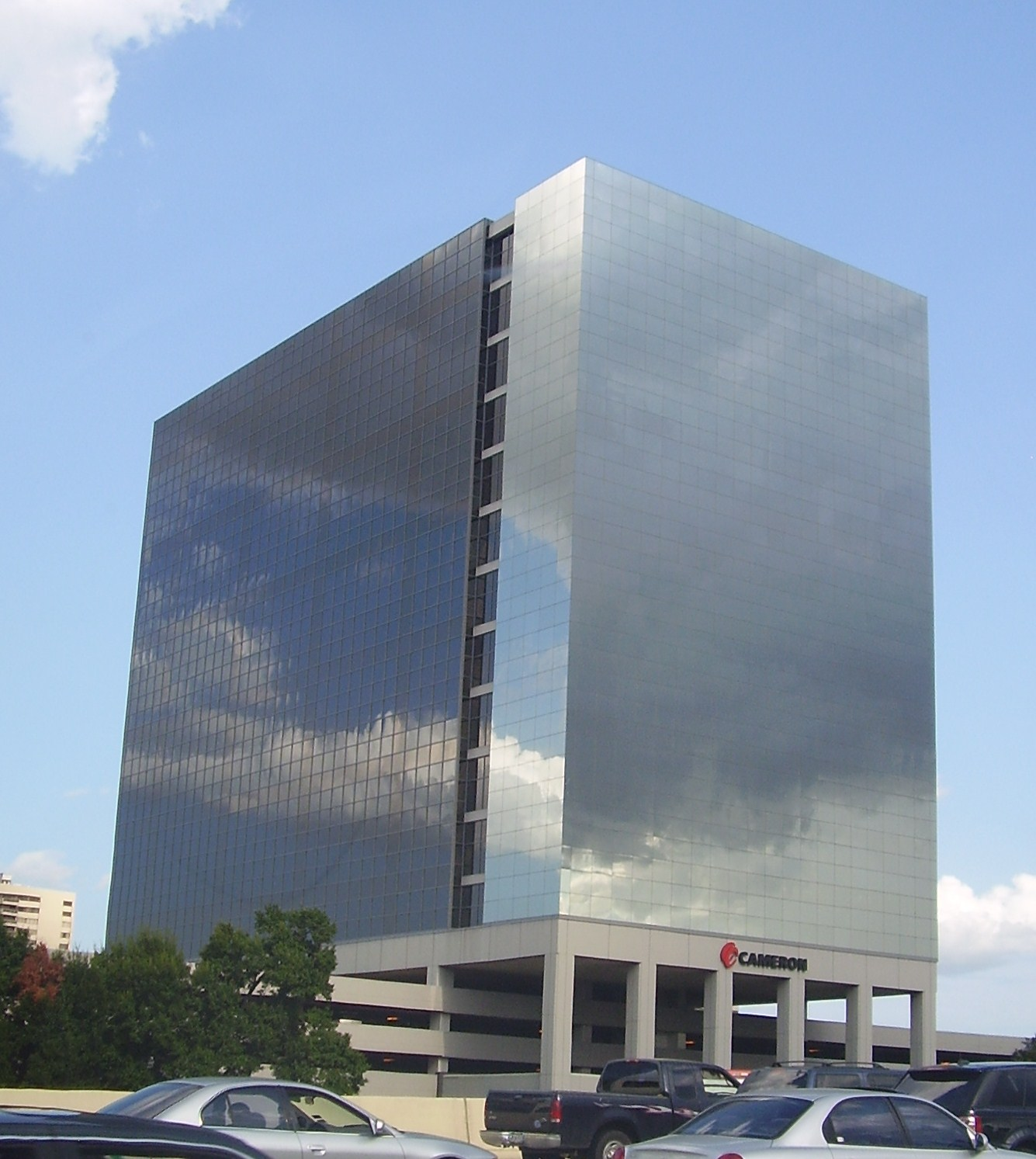
- Location: Houston
- Address: 1333 West Loop South; Suite 1300; Houston, TX 77027
- Coordinates: 29.7550°N 95.4547°W
- Opened: August 4, 2004
- Consul General: Aleksei G. Markov
- Website: rusconhouston.mid.ru

The Consulate General of the Russian Federation in Houston (Russian: Генеральное консульство Российской Федерации в Хьюстоне) (General'noe konsul'stvo Rossiyskoy Federatsii v Kh'yustone) is Russia's diplomatic office in Houston, Texas, United States. It is located in Suite 1300 at Park Towers South.

The facility serves Arizona, Alabama, Arkansas, Colorado, Iowa, Kansas, Louisiana, Mississippi, Missouri, Nebraska, New Mexico, Oklahoma, and Texas. The consulate assists with the processing of passports, visas, and other officials docs.

== History ==
In October 2001 the U.S. and Russia formally agreed to establish a Houston consulate. The Russian government approved the establishment on February 12, 2003. On May 9 of that year the United States Department of State confirmed the appointment of Houston's first Russian consul General Nikolay V. Sofinskiy. The facility opened on August 4, 2004.

Russia opened a consulate in Houston due to its proximity to the aerospace and petroleum industries. In a 2004 Houston Chronicle article Nikolai V. Sofinskiy stated that the Houston area had around 40,000 Russian speakers and that Houston's consulate could easily serve the southeastern United States.

== Consuls General of Russia in Houston ==
Name	Date
Nikolay Vsevolodovich Sofinskiy (born 10 February 1958)	2003—2008
Nikolay Yevgenyevich Babich (born 22 December 1948)	2008—2011
Alexander Konstantinovich Zakharov (born 18 February 1960)	2011—2017
Alexander Borisovich Pisarev (born 16 May 1956)	2017—2020
Alexander Konstantinovich Zakharov (2nd term)	2020—September 2023
Aleksei G. Markov (born 1980)	2025—Present

== Gallery ==
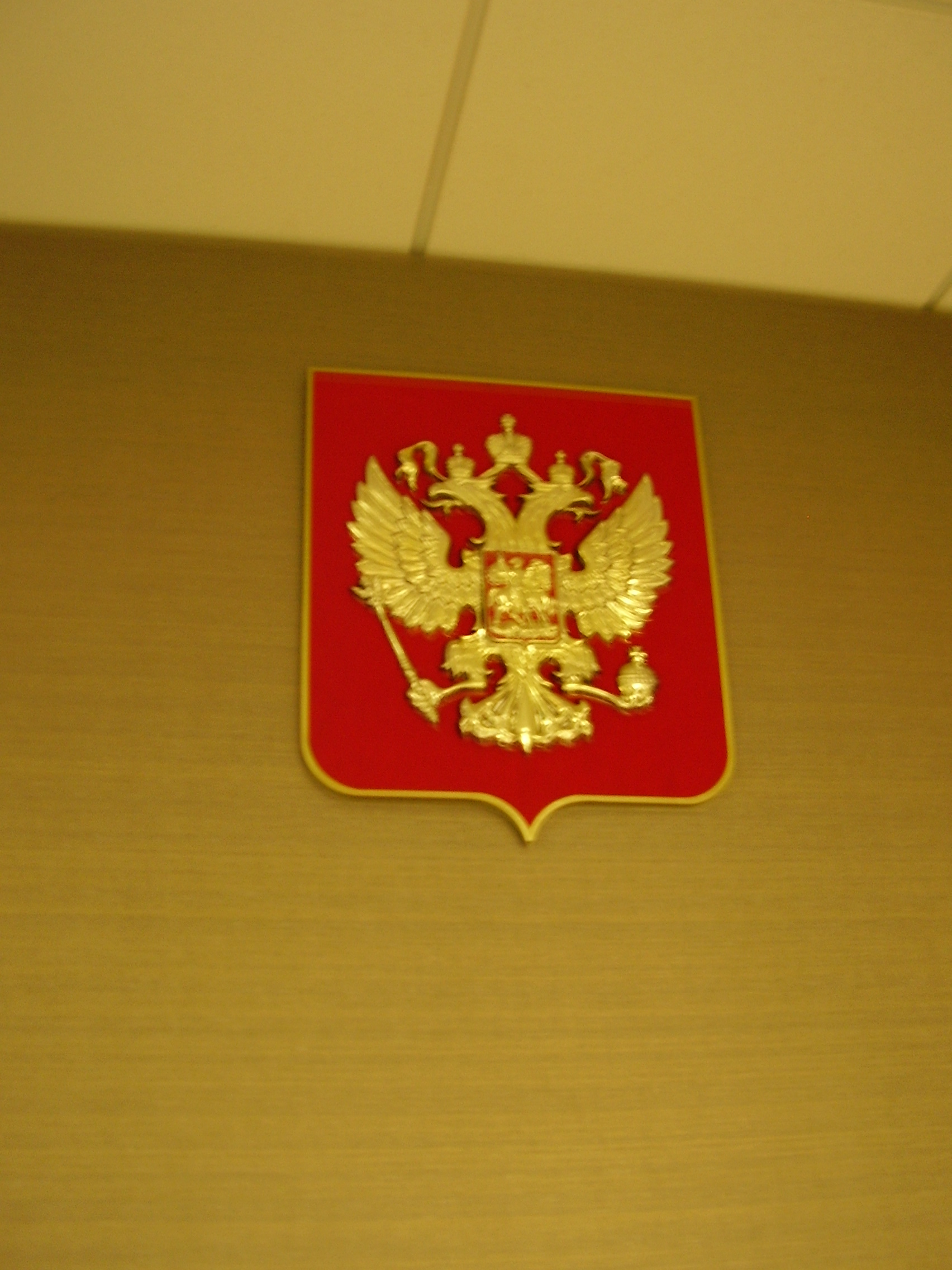
Arms of the Russian Federation displayed in the consulate

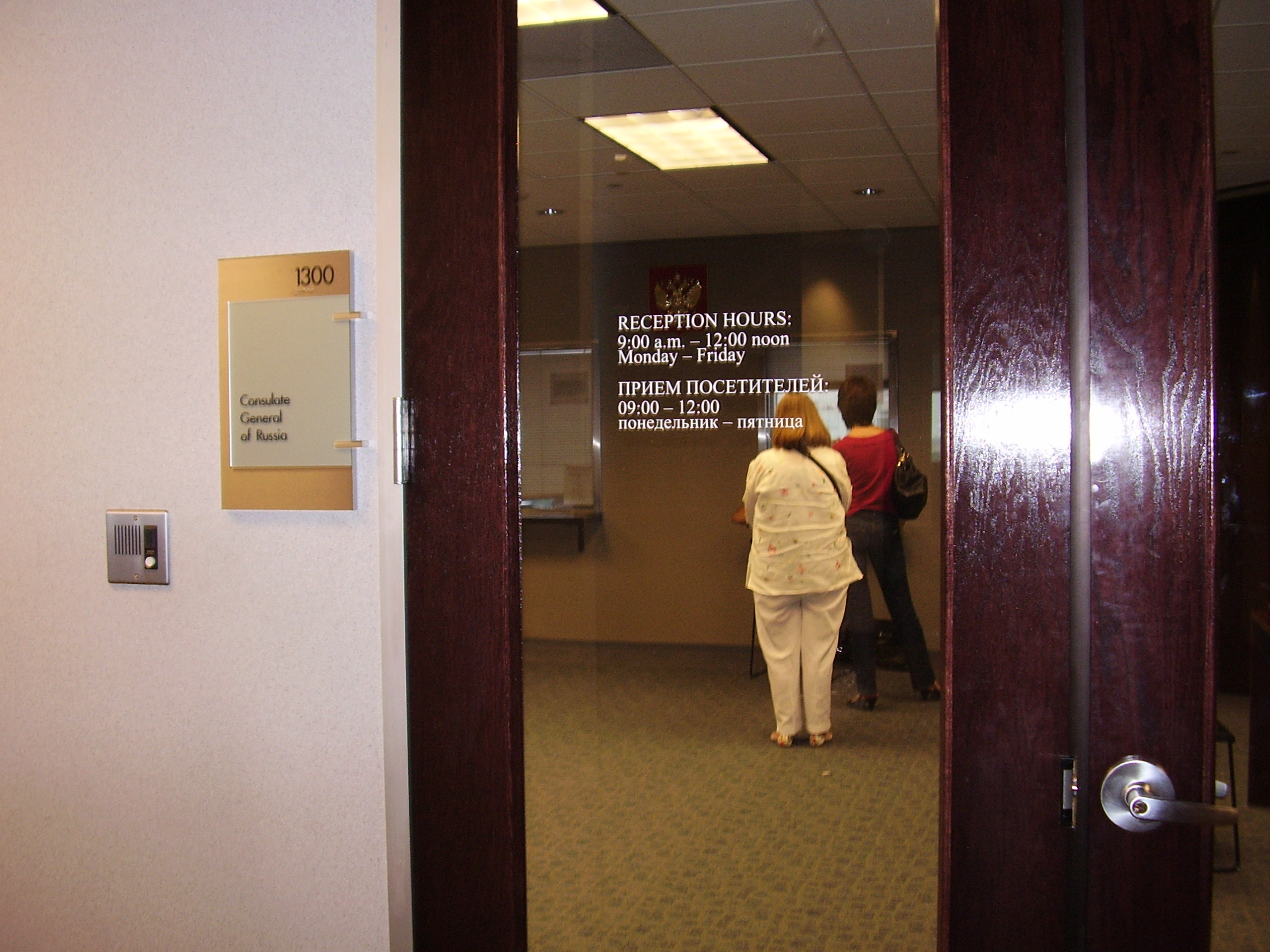
Entrance to the consulate

== See also ==
- List of diplomatic missions of Russia
- List of ambassadors of Russia to the United States
