= Matvei Kapelyushnikov =

Matvei Alkunovich Kapelyushnikov
- Матвей Алкунович Капелюшников
- Born: September 13, 1886; Russian Empire, Abastumani
- Died: July 5, 1959 (aged 72); USSR, Moscow
- Occupations: Engineer, inventor

Matvei Alkunovich Kapelyushnikov (Russian: Матвей Алкунович Капелюшников; 13 September 1886 – 5 July 1959) was a Soviet mechanical engineer and inventor. Corresponding Member of the USSR Academy of Sciences since 1939. Inventor of the turbodrill (1922). Author of works on oil cracking and enhanced oil recovery.

Matvei Kapelyushnikov was born in Abastumani. He began his career in the oil industry as a technical designer at an oil company called Baku Society of the Russian Oil in 1914. In 1915-1918, Matvei Kapelyushnikov was employed as a drilling rig designer and mechanical engineer at the Bykhovsky Refinery and then at a factory belonging to the Caspian Partnership oil company. In 1920-1924, he worked in the Azneft refineries administration in Baku. In 1920-1924, Matvei Kapelyushnikov was employed as a deputy head of the Azneft Technical Bureau. In 1933-1936, he held the director's post at the Azerbaijan Research Institute named after Valerian Kuybyshev. In 1937-1959, Kapelyushnikov headed the petroleum reservoir physics lab at the Oil Institute of the Soviet Academy of Sciences. He had been a drilling department professor at the Moscow Oil Institute named after Ivan Gubkin since 1945.

Matvei Kapelyushnikov's scientific work was dedicated to the extracting and refining technologies of oil and gas due to the intensified development of the petroleum industry during the years of the establishment of Soviet authority and especially post-World War II years. Kapelyushnikov's most famous invention was the revolutionary turbodrill - a hydraulic bottom-hole drill for drilling wells. It was patented in the United Kingdom (11 March 1925) and then in the Soviet Union (31 August 1925).

== Awards and honours ==
- Two Orders of Lenin (1931, ...)
- Three Orders of the Red Banner of Labour (1926, 1930)
- Order of the Patriotic War, 1st class
- Hero of Socialist Labour (1926)
- Doctor of Technical Sciences
- Professor
- Corresponding Member of the Academy of Sciences of the Soviet Union (1939)
- Honored Worker of Science and Technology of the RSFSR (1947)
