= OneSubsea =

Company that supplies the subsea oil and gas market

- Type: Public
- Traded as: NYSE: SLB; S&P 500 component Fortune 500
- Industry: Oilfield services & equipment
- Founded: November 15, 2012
- Headquarters: Oslo, Norway and Houston, Texas, US
- Number of locations: Oslo, Norway; Houston, Texas, US; Bergen, Norway; Pune, India; Celle, Germany; Leeds, England, UK; Aberdeen, Scotland, UK; Barrow-in-Furness, England; Taubate, Brazil; Macae, Brazil,Basra; Iraq
- Area served: Worldwide
- Key people: Mads Hjelmeland, CEO
- Products: Integrated Solutions, Production Systems, Processing Systems, Control Systems, Swivel and Marine Systems, Subsea Services
- Revenue: $2 Billion USD (2014)
- Number of employees: 11 000
- Parent: Schlumberger
- Website: www.onesubsea.slb.com

OneSubsea is a SLB company, headquartered in Oslo, Norway and Houston, Texas, United States. The company is a subsea supplier for the subsea oil and gas market. As of August 2024, the company was the world’s largest in terms of installed subsea christmas trees

== History ==
In November 2012, Cameron International and Schlumberger announced that they were forming a Joint venture called OneSubsea. Cameron would manage OneSubsea with a 60% interest, with Schlumberger retaining 40%.

In January 2015, Helix, OneSubsea and Schlumberger formed the Subsea Services Alliance to develop technologies and deliver equipment and services to optimize the value chain of subsea well intervention systems.

In July 2015, Subsea 7 and OneSubsea entered into an agreement to form a non-incorporated alliance. The alliance was formed to focus on subsea production systems (SPS) and subsea processing systems, subsea umbilicals, risers and flowlines systems (SURF), and life-of-field services.

In August 2015, OneSubsea was awarded a contract to supply subsea processing systems for Shell's Stones development in the Gulf of Mexico.

Schlumberger announced in August 2015 that it was acquiring Cameron and OneSubsea for $14.8 billion.

Schlumberger announced in August 2022, that OneSubsea was going into a joint venture with AkerSolutions and Subsea7. The ownership of OneSubsea is 70% with Schlumberger, 20% with AkerSolutions and Subsea7 owning the last 10%

In July 2024, it was announced that OneSubsea was awarded the contract to front-end design an all electric subsea tree project from Equinor called Fram-Sør. managed by LD.

== See also ==
- List of oilfield service companies
- List of companies of Norway
- Oil industry
- Wellhead
