= Park Towers (Houston) =

Skyscraper in Houston

Coordinates: 29.7556°N 95.4545°W

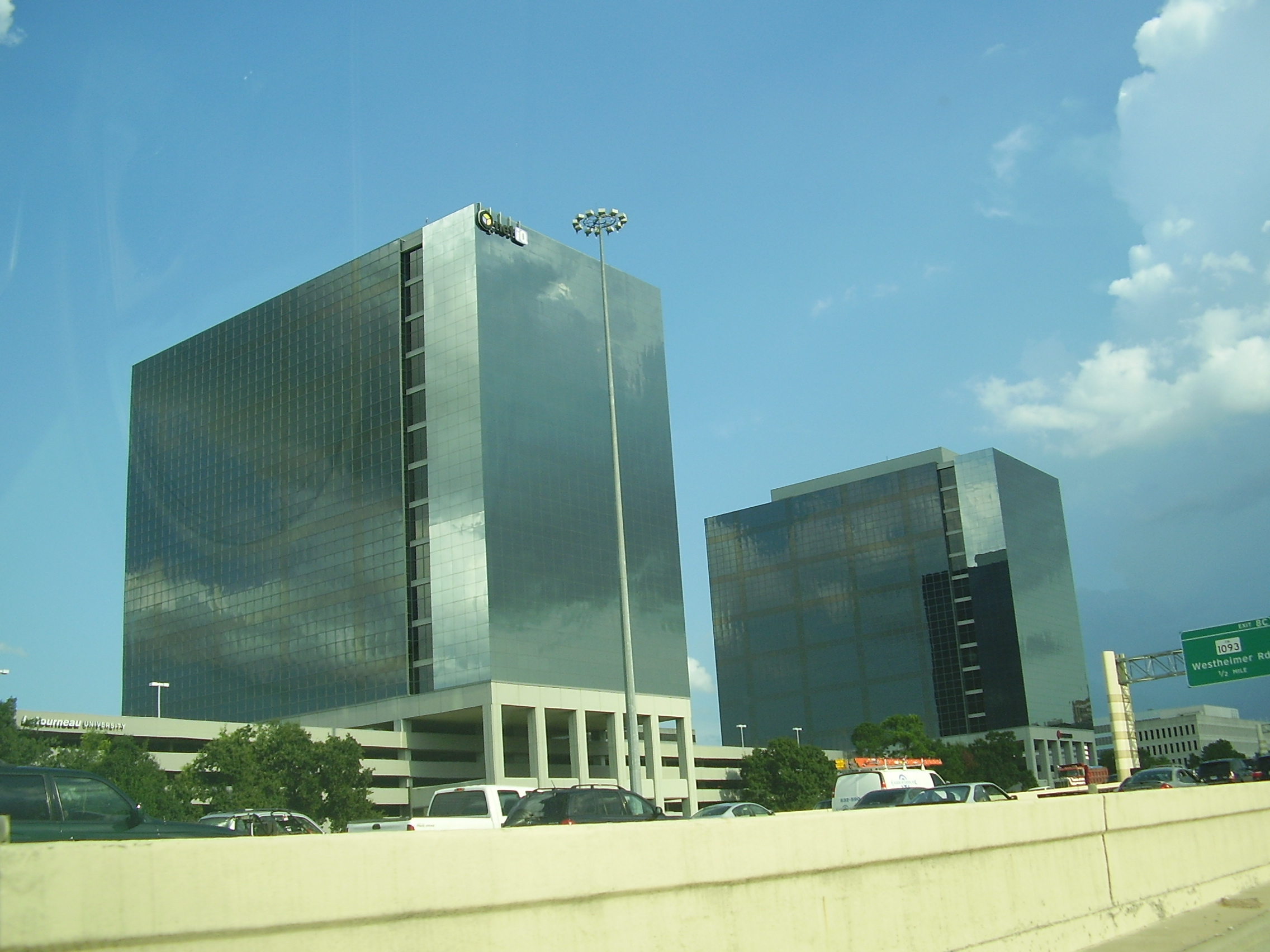
The Park Towers

Park Towers is a complex of two office buildings along the 610 Loop in Houston, Texas, United States. It consists of two 18 story office towers, Park Towers North and Park Towers South, which each have 272,621 square feet (25,327.3 m^{2}) of rentable space, and one six story parking garage. The building, in proximity to Uptown Houston, is owned by Post Oak Partners LLP; TPMC Realty Corp. provides leasing and management services. Previously Cameron International Corporation maintained its international headquarters in Park Towers South.

== History ==
The buildings were built in 1972 and 1973. Throughout the complex's history Halliburton, Philadelphia Life, and Tenneco rented space in the complex. By 1992 the buildings were vacant. Lynn Cook of the Houston Business Journal said in 1999 that "for more than a decade Park Towers has sat like a stark white elephant."

In December Holliday Fenoglio Fowler secured financing to allow TPMC Realty Corp. to extensively renovate the buildings. TPMC stripped the buildings to their concrete and steel girders and then rebuilt the two towers. TPMC rebuilt the twin towers with glass curtain walls and expanded the floor plates to 22,000 square feet (2,000 m^{2}). 60,000 square feet (5,600 m^{2}) of office space was added to the complex. By 2000 PentaSafe Securities Technologies announced that it was leasing 89,000 square feet (8,300 m^{2}) in the Park Towers. PentaSafe, the first tenant in the new Park Towers in August 2000, was acquired by NetIQ in 2002.

For five years after the renovation the occupancy rate remained at 72%. In 2003 37,000 square feet (3,400 m^{2}) in the complex was leased. Parkway Properties, Inc., hired by the owners of Park Towers to increase the occupancy rate, contacted General Electric. After an 18-month search, in 2004 General Electric announced that GE Energy was moving 300 employees into 78,225 square feet (7,267.3 m^{2}) of space in the Park Towers South building. GE had an option on an additional 100,000 square feet (9,300 m^{2}) for expansion. GE stated that it chose the building because of the location, visibility, and the quality of the building. During that year the face rates at Park Towers was about $21 to $24 per square foot. After the GE lease, the south tower was 85% leased and the north tower was 95% leased. During that year other tenants of the Park Towers included Cooper Cameron, NetIQ Corp Prudential Securities, and SouthTrust Bank. During the same year United HealthCare Services announced that it was taking 22,300 square feet (2,070 m^{2}) of space in Park Towers South and moving out of the 2000 West Loop South building across 610. Its move-in date was scheduled as September 1, 2004. Between January 1, 2004 and August 6, 2004 122,000 square feet (11,300 m^{2}) of space was signed into leasing.

In addition, in 2004 NetIQ Corp. renewed its lease of 115,000 square feet (10,700 m^{2}) of space in the building for 10 years. NetIQ's lease was scheduled to expire in 2005.

As of 2010 the buildings are 99% occupied, with the unused space consisting of unusable corridor space and janitor storage closet space.

The Houston Business Journal had occupied space in the Park Towers for a period of over 10 years. In 2012 the newspaper announced that it was moving to 5444 Westheimer Road effective November 5, 2012.

On January 15, 2016, a renovation, with Ziegler Cooper Architects as the main architect, began.

== Tenants ==
- The Consulate-General of Brazil is in Park Towers North, Suite 1150
- The Consulate General of Russia is in Park Towers South, Suite 1300 - It opened on August 4, 2004.
- Cadence Bank headquarters

Former tenants:

- The Houston Business Journal was in Park Towers North, Suite 1300. In 2012 the newspaper announced that it was moving to 5444 Westheimer Road effective November 5, 2012.

== Gallery ==
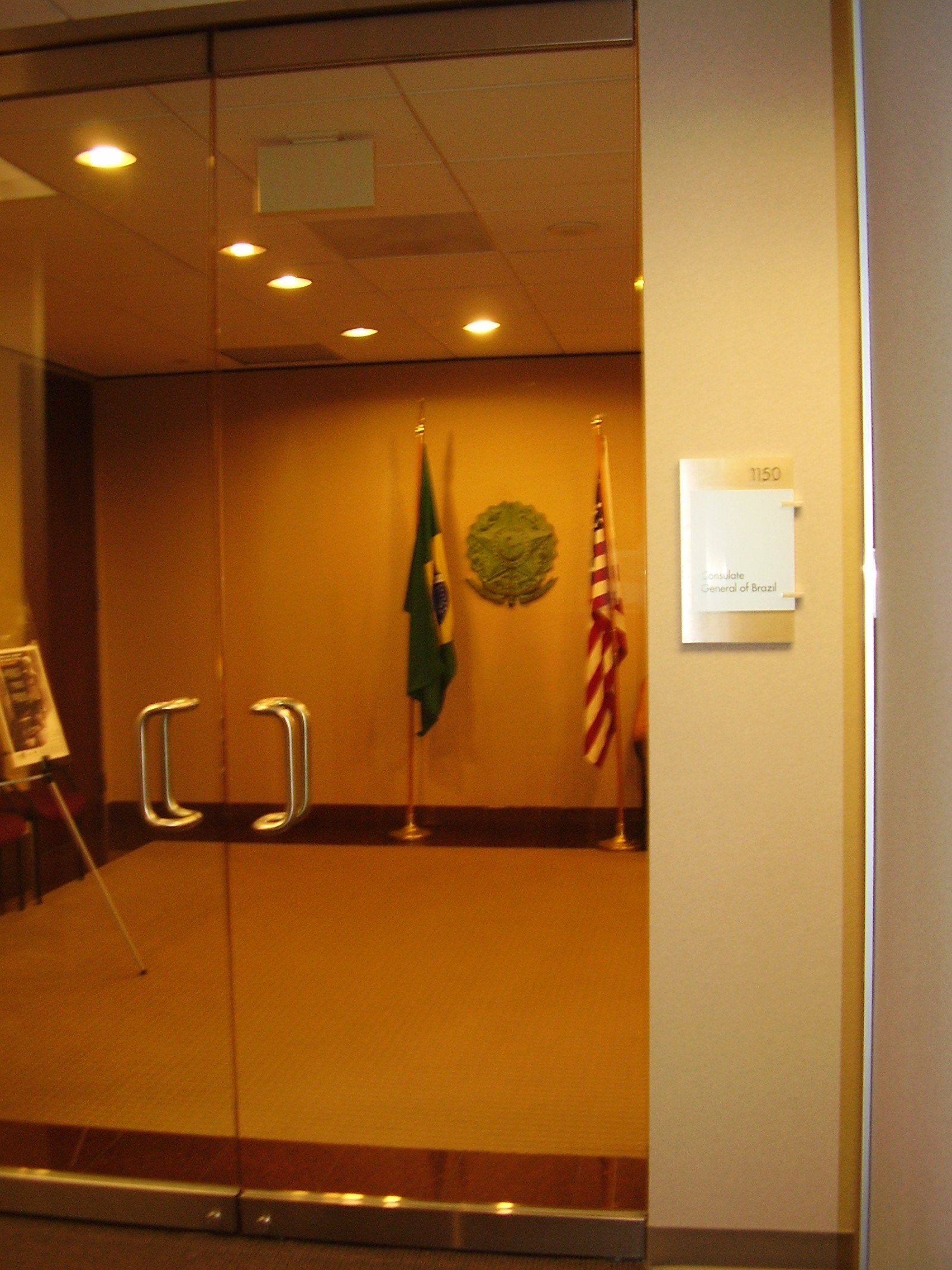
Consulate-General of Brazil

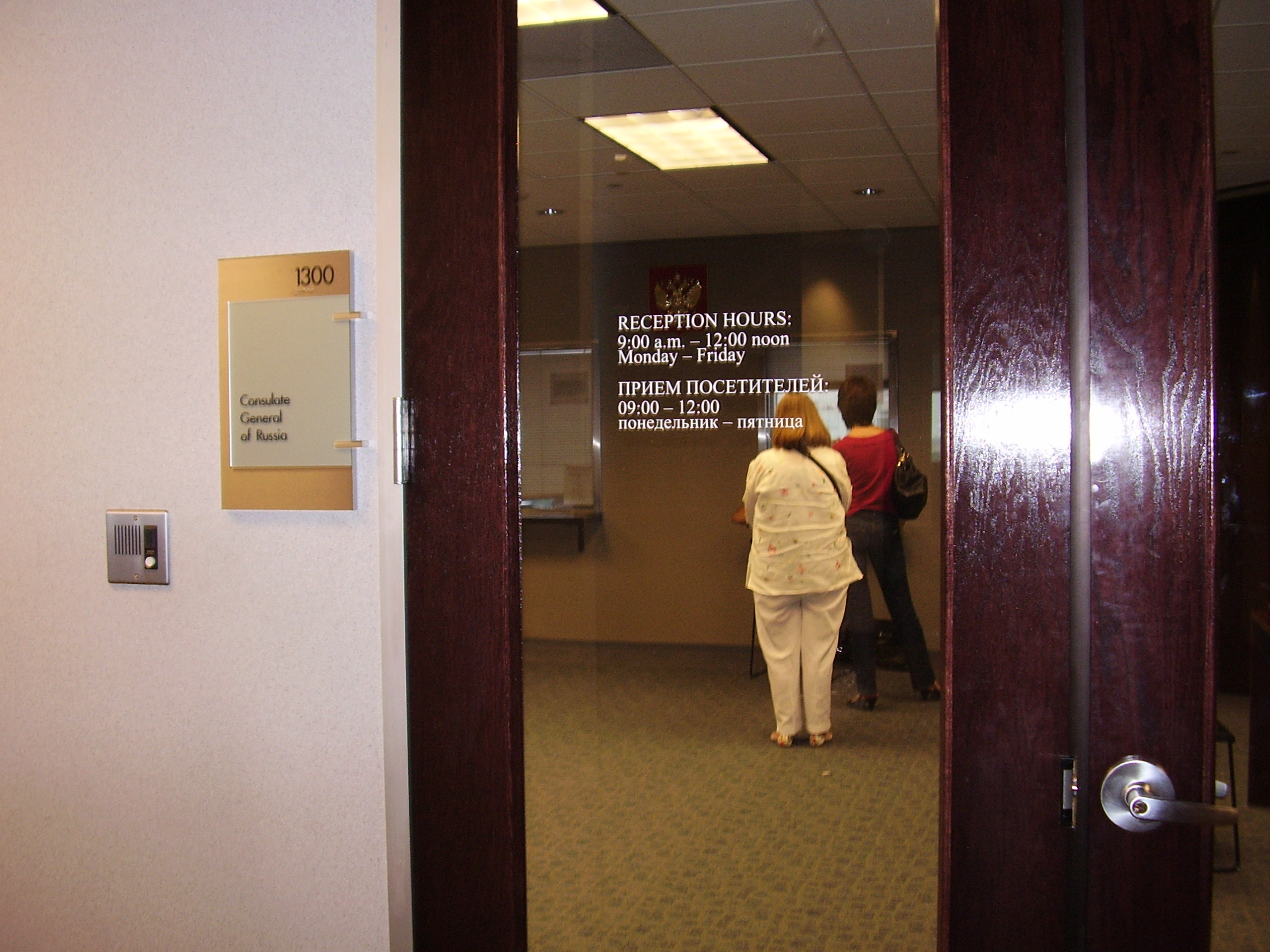
Consulate General of Russia
