= Turbodrill =

A turbodrill is a tool used mostly by petrochemical companies to dig wells for crude oil and natural gas reserves.

== History of turbodrilling ==
- Among the technical breakthroughs in the world oil industry in the 1920s, a special place is held by the invention in 1922 of the reduction-geared, single-stage downhole turbodrill motor by the Russian engineer Matvei Kapelyushnikov, which opened the way for the subsequent mass introduction of turbodrilling in the industry.
- In 1924 the first US Patent was issued to a company called Scharpenberg for the first multi-staged turbodrill.
- In 1982 the first steerable turbodrill was developed by a company called Neyrfor. This was steerable because it had a stabilizer that was offset from the rest, pulling the tool to one particular side. Using the law of inertia, one could alter the direction of the hole being drilled by changing the direction of the offset.
- In 1992 the first steerable turbodrill using a bent housing was created by Neyrfor. The advantage to using the bent housing method of steering instead of an offset stabilizer, is that it provided a straighter hole with less of a corkscrew effect, which in turn made drilling more efficient, faster, and more accurate.
- Continuing traditions of Russian engineer Matvey Kapelyushnikov the company JSC "NGT" constantly improves designs of turbodrills.

== How a turbodrill works ==
Turbodrills use the mechanical energy of the drill itself, and the hydraulic energy provided by the oil rig’s mud pumps to deliver power to the drill bit. The drill bit on a turbodrill spins much faster than on a conventional motor drill. The result is that, though there is less torque, this is compensated for by the increased speed, which makes straighter holes, and can drill faster and easier through tougher ground materials. The process is very similar to a dental drill used by a dentist. These tools are able to dig faster, operate in a much higher temperature environment, deliver longer downhole life, and produce a better and straighter hole quality than a conventional mud motor. In many applications turbodrills can offer their customers significant cost savings over standard drilling systems by saving them time spent drilling the hole since they typically pay drillers by the hour.
