= Cooper-Bessemer =

American brand of industrial engines and compressors

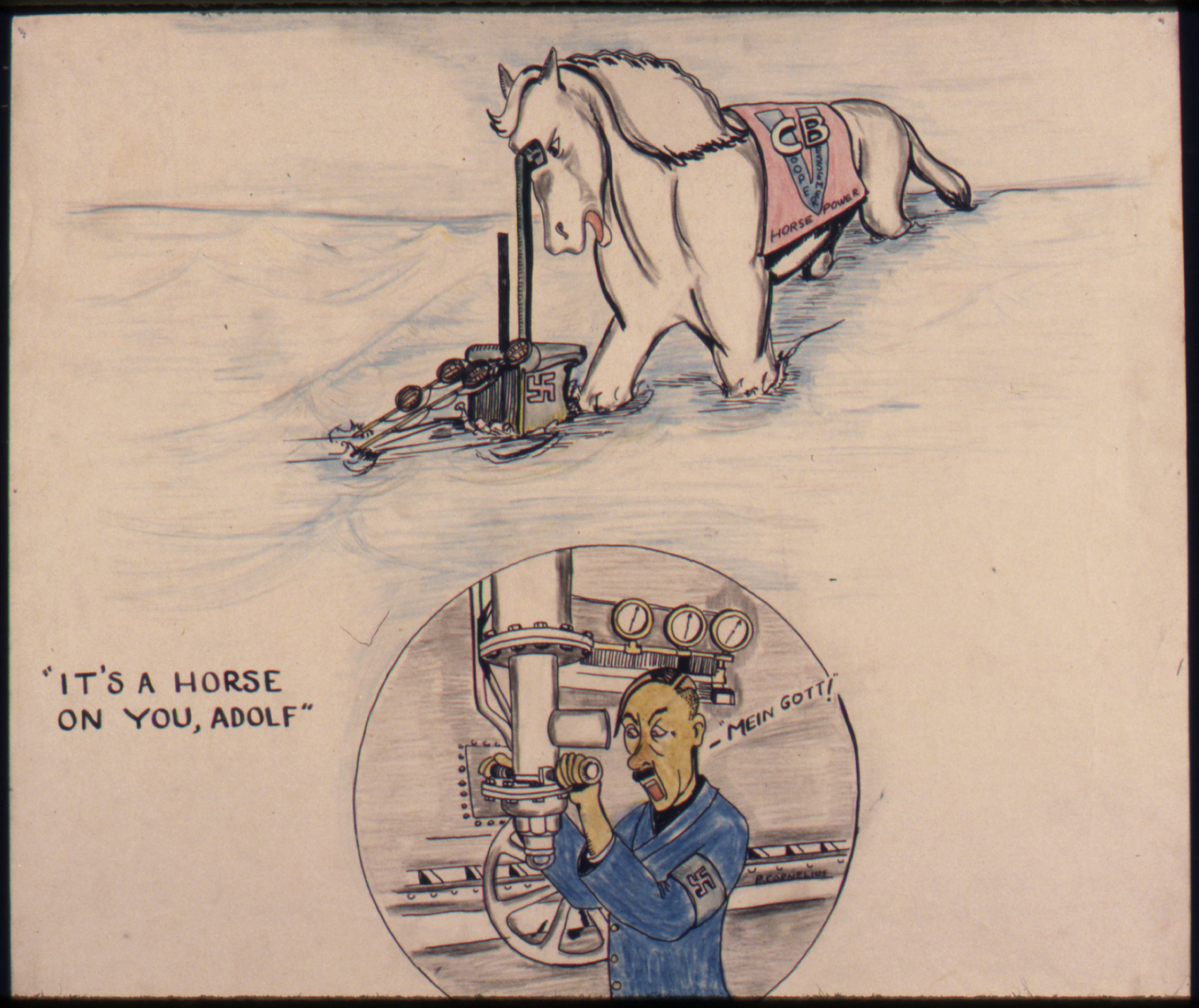
World War II poster promoting Cooper-Bessemer engines

Cooper-Bessemer was a brand of industrial engines and compressors manufactured in Mount Vernon, Ohio. The Cooper-Bessemer Corporation was formed when the C. & G. Cooper Company (founded in 1833) and the Bessemer Gas Engine Company (founded in 1899) merged in 1929. In 1965, the company was renamed to Cooper Industries and relocated to Houston, Texas. In the 1990s, Cooper Industries' Petroleum and Industrial Equipment Group was spun off to become Cooper Cameron Corporation, known as the Compression Systems group of Cameron International Corporation. Cooper Machinery Services is the current original equipment manufacturer for Cooper-Bessemer engines.

== Products ==
=== Engines ===
In 1929, Cooper-Bessemer products included gas engine-driven compressors, stationary and marine diesel engines, and gasoline engines. During World War II, Cooper-Bessemer contributed to the war effort by manufacturing diesel engines for troop and cargo ships, as well as warships, tugboats, and rescue and patrol boats. Cooper-Bessemer gas engines were widely used in the production of rubber, alloys, light metals, high-octane aircraft fuel, and synthetic ammonia for munitions, and in refineries, chemical plants, shipyards, and petroleum pipelines. Many early GE diesel locomotives had Cooper-Bessemer engines.

=== Compressors ===
From the 1920s to the 1980s, the company manufactured thousands of Cooper-Bessemer integral engine-compressors, including the GMV, GMW, and GMX series, and the V-250, V-275, W-330, Z-330, and QUAD compressors. These compressors used a "compact, V-angle engine design with an articulated connecting-rod arrangement, allowing power piston connecting rods to drive onto one master compressor rod for each throw of the crankshaft." "The GMV integral-angle gas engine-compressor was a major contributor to the world’s economy for more than a half century, providing compression energy for natural-gas transmission, gas treatment, and petrochemical, refinery, and power industries in the United States and 44 countries around the world."

== Current ownership ==
Thousands of Cooper-Bessemer engines continue to operate today. General Electric bought this product line from Cameron in 2014. Cooper Machinery Services is the current original equipment manufacturer for Cooper-Bessemer engines.
