= Ajax Engines =

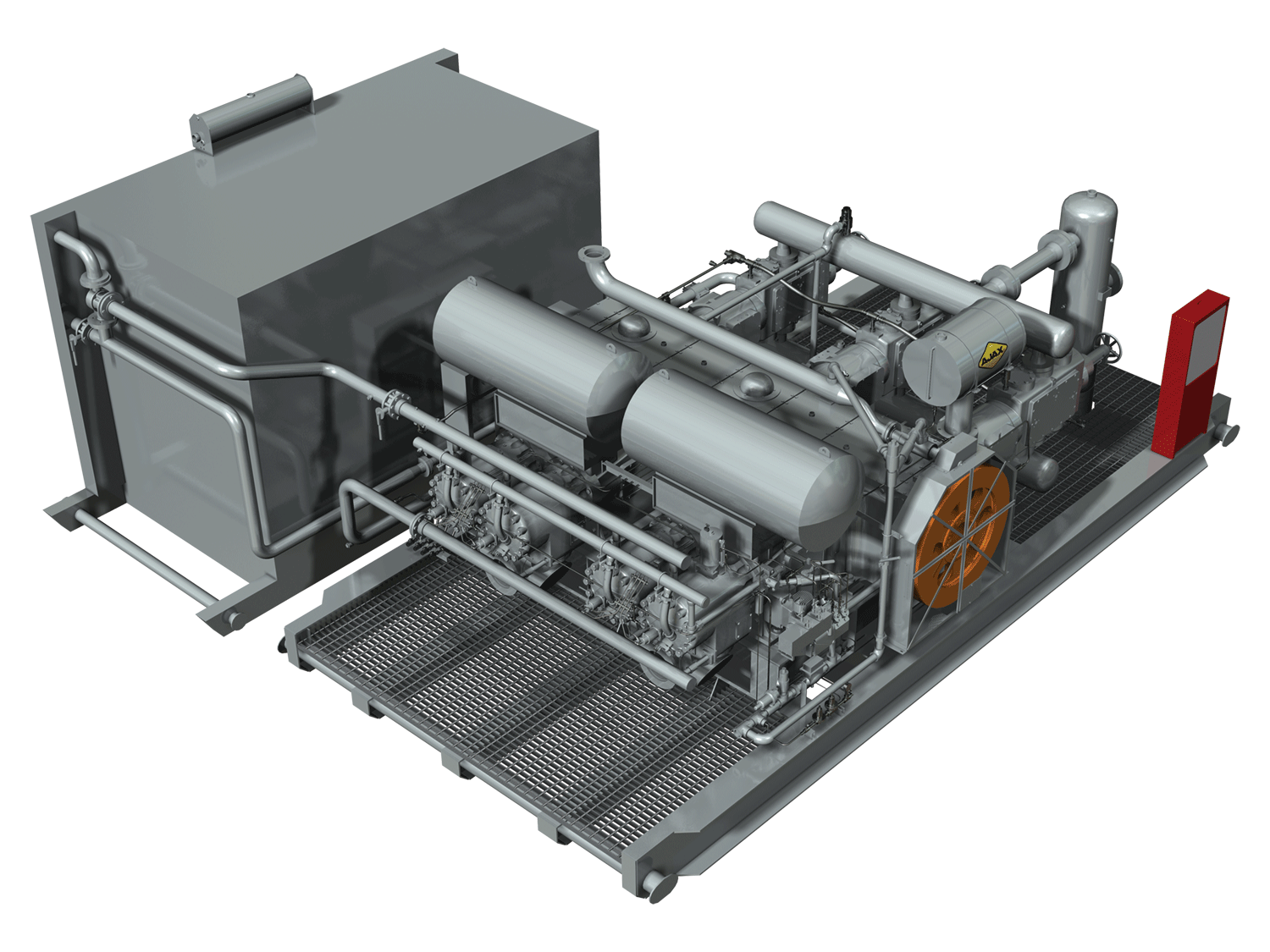
Ajax Integral Engine and Compressor.

Ajax is a brand of integral engine / compressor manufactured by the original equipment manufacturer, Cooper Machinery Services ). Ajax is the oldest continuous engine product line manufactured in the United States and has been utilized in the oil and gas industry for 130+ years. Ajax integral engine-compressors are gas compressors with built-in reciprocating engines. Their compact design and gas drive make them useful for field installation and work.

== History ==
The Ajax Iron Works started in 1877 in Corry, Pennsylvania, manufacturing steam engines. In 1895, the company added gas engines to its product line, and would continue to manufacture gas and steam until the latter was discontinued following World War II. Starting in 1946, Ajax gas engines became a primary product utilized by oil and gas companies. In 1958, the first Ajax integral engine / compressor was manufactured and was specifically designed for field gas gathering applications. It was a DPC 230 and was soon followed by a complete line of Ajax integral engine-compressors from 30-360 horsepower. In 1963, the company was bought by the Cooper Cameron Corporation (Cameron). In response to demand for a larger Ajax, the DPC 600 was introduced in 1976. This was followed by the DPC 800 in 1984. Cooper Machinery Services is the current original equipment manufacturer for Ajax engines and compressors.

== Today ==
In the 1990s, the Ajax DPC 2200 series and the DPC 2800 series were created and are still manufactured today. Cooper Machinery Services is the current original equipment manufacturer for AJAX engines.
