= Joy Compressor =

Joy Compressors were first introduced in 1955 when the Joy Manufacturing Company hired four engineers and set them up in an office over a hardware store in Western New York. Within a short period of time, a farmer's field in Cheektowaga, New York was purchased for a test site. The early years were spent in R&D with the development of various types of turbo machinery including gas turbines, steam turbines, axial flow compressors, in-line centrifugal compressors and integral gear centrifugal compressors.

In 1960, the Joy facility was transformed into a full-fledged manufacturing factory focused on producing integrally geared centrifugal air compressors which produced oil free air flow.

The 1970s saw Joy compressors grow in the US domestic market with much focus on engineered custom compressors for refineries and air separation. Joy centrifugal compressors are operated in dozens of applications throughout the world and are integral to the following industries: auto, glass, textiles, petrochemical, snow making, electronics, food, industrial gases, chemical, refining, and energy.
