= Cameron International =

American oilfield services company

Cameron
- Industry: Oil well services, equipment
- Founded: 1920, Houston, Texas
- Defunct: April 1, 2016
- Headquarters: Houston, Texas; United States
- Key people: Harry Cameron, James Abercrombie, Founders
- Parent: SLB
- Website: cameron.slb.com

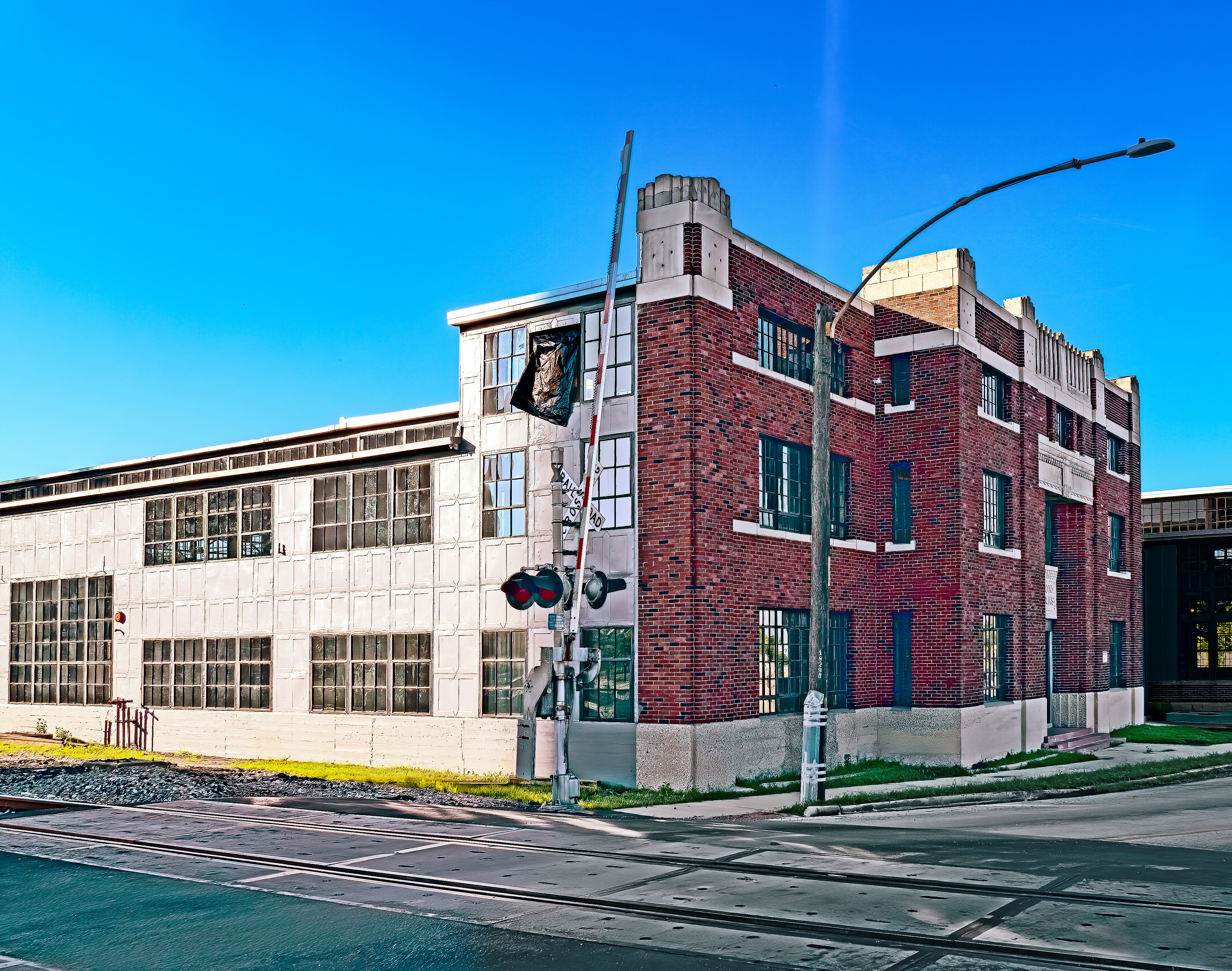
Original Cameron Iron Works Building. On the National Register of Historic Places

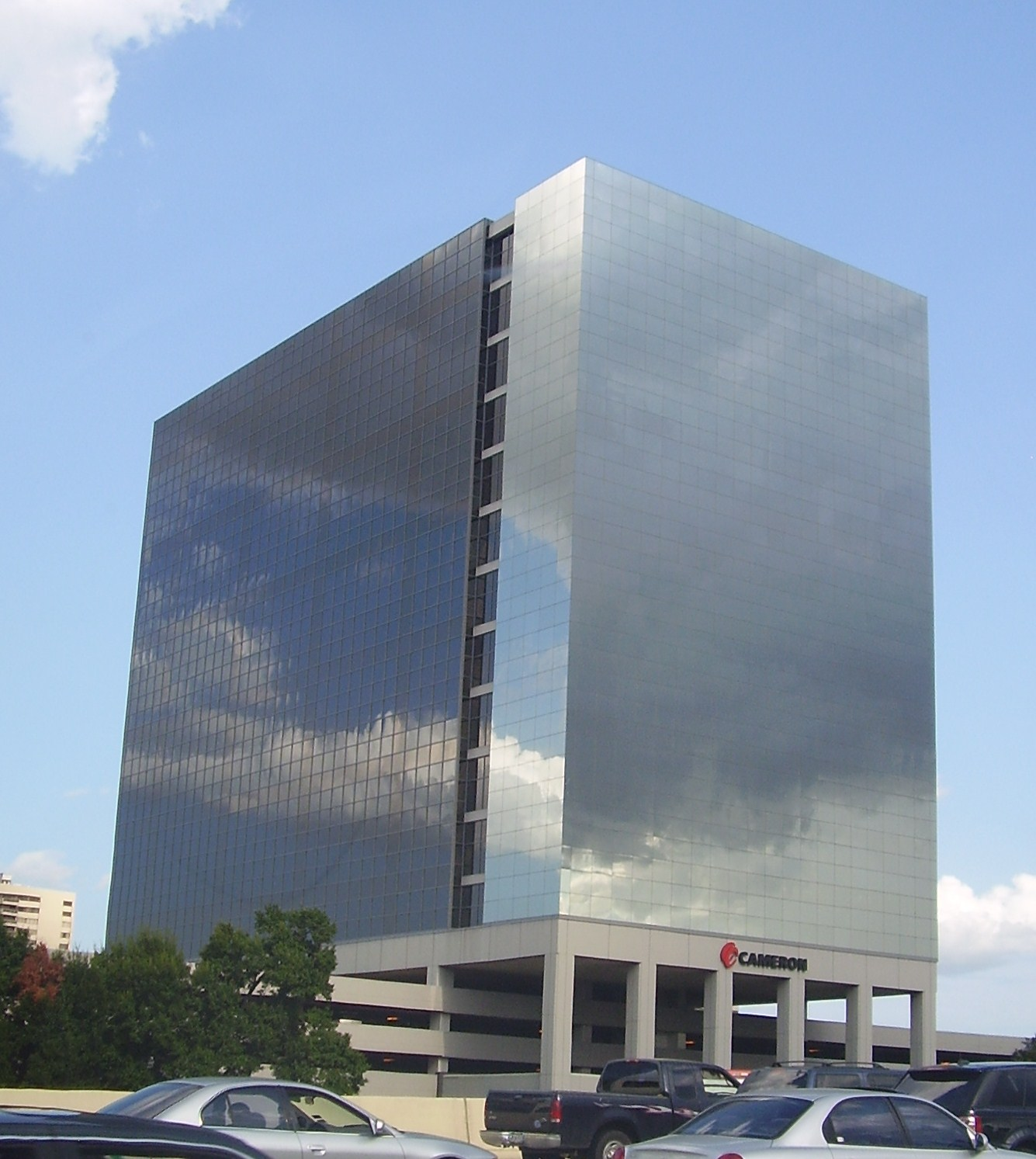
Park Towers South, which was the former headquarters of Cameron

Cameron International Corporation (formerly Cooper Cameron Corporation and Cooper Oil Tool, Cameron Iron Works) is a now-defunct company that was a global provider of pressure control, production, processing, and flow control systems as well as project management and aftermarket services for the oil and gas and process industries. Cameron was acquired by SLB in 2016, and now operates as a legacy brand of the company.

== Organization ==
At the time of its acquisition, the main business lines (product groups) were:

- The Drilling Systems business line manufactured pressure control equipment and provided aftermarket services for worldwide onshore, offshore and subsea oil & gas drilling and production operations. Also provides system design and project management services for worldwide offshore oil and gas completion operations.
- The Surface Systems business line manufactured and designed Wellheads, Fracturing Trees and other wellhead products for onshore and offshore oil production. Over the years Cameron acquired Ingram Cactus, Tundra and McEvoy companies which has grown Cameron's aftermarket knowledge and market share in the wellhead industry.
- The Valves & Process Systems business line provided flow control equipment and aftermarket services for worldwide onshore, offshore and subsea oil & gas production, pipeline and process operations.
- OneSubsea provided production equipment for Subsea oil and gas applications, including Integrated Solutions, Production Systems, Processing Systems, Control Systems, Swivel and Marine Systems, and Subsea Services.

== History ==
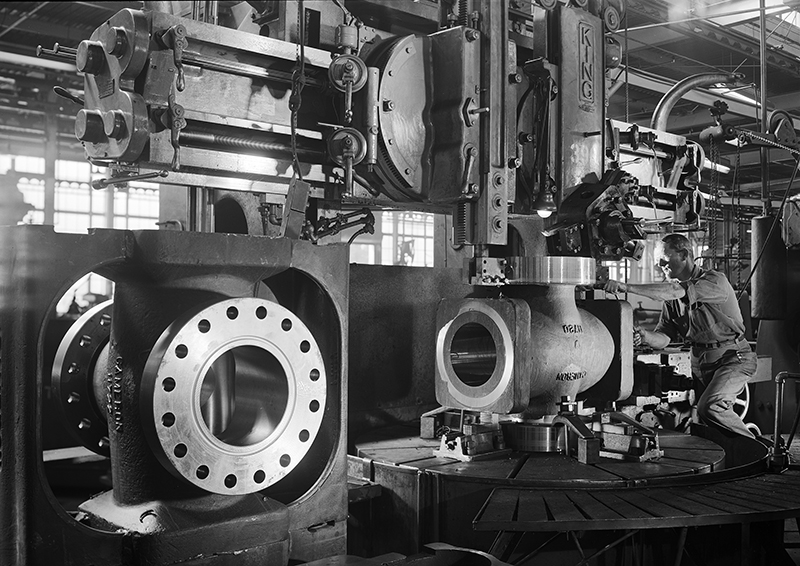
Worker machining hole flange, Cameron Iron Works, Houston, 1948

Cooper Industries began in 1833 when Charles and Elias Cooper established a foundry in Mt. Vernon, Ohio. Cooper was licensed to produce the Corliss steam engine in 1869 and entered the production of natural gas-fueled internal combustion engines in 1900. In 1929, Cooper became the Cooper-Bessemer Corporation when it merged with Bessemer Gas Engine Company, which was founded in Grove City, Pennsylvania in 1899. In 1958, Cooper diversified into the controls industry with the establishment of the En-Tronic Controls Group. Five years later, the company acquired the Ajax Engines Company, founded in 1877, and the Pennsylvania Process, founded to manufacture compressors in 1920.

In 1965, the growing Cooper Industries branched out into electrical, automotive and tools and hardware industries. Two years later, it moved its headquarters to Houston and in 1968 began the Cooper Rolls joint venture with Rolls-Royce to market gas turbines.

The year 1987 marked the acquisition of Joy Industrial Compressor Group, founded in 1955 in Buffalo, New York, which was renamed Cooper Turbocompressor as part of Cooper Compression. W-K-M valves company, established in 1905 in Houston, and Demco Valve Company, established in 1947, were both acquired by Cooper Flow Control Division in the same year. One year later, Cooper acquired Enterprise Engine aftermarket services business.

1989 marked the acquisition of Cameron Iron Works, which was renamed Cooper Oil Tool. Cameron Iron Works was incorporated in Houston in 1920, by Harry Cameron and James Abercombie, and had branched out to Canada in Edmonton in 1951. It purchased the British Oil Field Equipment Company of London and Leeds in 1954 and acquired McEvoy valve and wellhead manufacturer, founded in 1905, and Willis oilfield choke manufacturer, formed in 1939, in 1987.

In 1994, Cooper Industries spun off its Petroleum and Industrial Equipment Group to focus on the electrical products, automotive products and tools & hardware businesses. Cameron Forged Products was acquired by Wyman-Gordon. One year later, Cooper Cameron Corporation was spun off as a publicly traded company with a separate management group and Cameron and Cooper Cameron Valves divisions were formed from Cooper Oil Tool. Wheeling Machine Products Company's oilfield coupling business was also sold.

The growing company acquired many different companies into various divisions from 1996 to 1998. Ingram Cactus Corporation, Tundra Valve & Wellhead Corporation, Wellhead Services and Marta Company were combined into Cameron. Ajax Repair & Supply, General Turbine Systems, PDQ Machine, and certain assets of Enox Technologies were acquired and combined into Cooper Energy Services. Daniel Ball Valve and Orbit Valve International were acquired into Cooper Cameron Valves.

In 1999, the rotating compressor business was sold to Rolls-Royce and Cooper Energy Services merged with Nickles Industrial Manufacturing and purchased Elliot Turbocharger Group, Inc. Three years later, Cooper Cameron Valves acquired Nutron Industries and in 2003, Cooper Energy Services and Cooper Turbocompressor combined to form Cooper Compression.

In the 21st century, Petreco International was acquired and began operation as a separate division and PCC Flow Technologies, NuFlo Technologies and Dresser Flow Control were acquired and combined into Cooper Cameron Valves and Cameron.

In 2006, Cooper Cameron Corporation officially changed its name to Cameron International Corporation.

In 2011, Cameron purchased the Drilling, Offshore, and Power Systems divisions of LeTourneau Technologies.

In November 2012, Cameron announced plans to carve out its subsea division (and receive $600 million from SLB) to form a 60/40 joint venture with SLB Framo, Surveillance, Flow Assurance and Power and Controls businesses. In June 2013, Cameron and SLB entered into a joint venture called OneSubsea that manufactures and develops products, systems, and services for the subsea oil and gas market. The parties closeed the transaction making OneSubsea operational on June 30, 2013.

=== Downturn and merger with SLB ===
In 2014, Cameron started facing a downturn in business due to a sharp decrease in oil prices throughout that year, which led to oil drillers sharply decreasing their output and patronization to Cameron. As a result, Cameron was forced to lay off many employees and weather a sharp decrease in share price. This led to the company to spin off and sell many of its businesses including its reciprocating compression division to GE Oil and Gas, as well as its centrifugal compression unit to Ingersoll-Rand in January and August of 2014 respectively. In 2015, the company starting negotiating its acqusition by SLB, which made for a convenient deal since the two companies already had the OneSubsea joint venture. SLB was expect to save $900 mn as a result of eliminating operational redundancies and excess drilling capacity upon acquiring Cameron. The acquisition would also incorporate Cameron’s pressure valves and blowout preventers into SLB's portfolio. In April 2016, SLB completed the acquisition of Cameron International for $14.8 billion, in a combination of stock and cash.

== Role in 2010 Gulf Oil spill ==
Cameron manufactured and sold to Transocean in 2000 the blowout preventer (BOP) that failed to close the well head and stop the flow of oil from the Deepwater Horizon oil well in the Gulf of Mexico. News reports stated the equipment was not properly maintained by its operators and may have led to failure of the BOP system. In December, 2011, Cameron agreed to pay a $250 million settlement to BP PLC to settle all claims related to the Deepwater Horizon without admitting responsibility.

== See also ==
- List of oilfield service companies
- NATCO Group
- Oil industry
- Wellhead
- Drilling industry
