= Sweda =

Sweda is a surname. Notable people with the surname include:

- Mick Sweda (born 1960), American musician
- Joseph Sweda (1926–2015), American politician
